= List of songs recorded by Sabrina Carpenter =

Songs by American singer

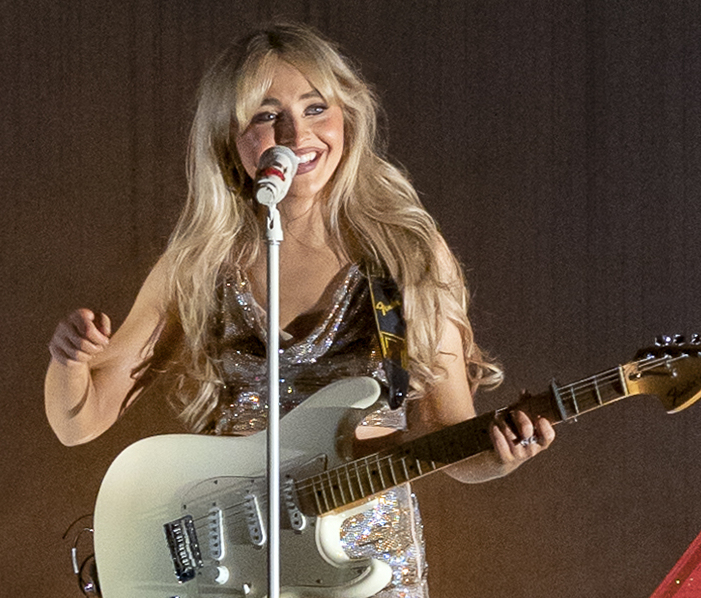
Carpenter performing in 2022.

American singer Sabrina Carpenter's recording career began at the age of 10 when she decided to post song covers on YouTube. She began a solo singing career in 2014 after gaining popularity on Disney Channel in various television shows and films for the channel. Signing with Disney's label Hollywood Records, she released her debut single "Can't Blame a Girl for Trying" which was featured on her debut EP of the same name. She went on to release the albums Eyes Wide Open (2015), Evolution (2016), Singular: Act I (2018) and Singular: Act II (2019) before moving to Island Records and subsequently releasing Emails I Can't Send (2022), Short n' Sweet (2024) and Man's Best Friend (2025).

Her early singles found limited commercial success with "Thumbs" and "Why" peaking at numbers one and 21 on the US Bubbling Under Hot 100 chart. Her 2018 singles, "Alien", "Almost Love" and "Sue Me", all charted at number one on the US Dance Club Songs chart. In 2021, her debut single with Island Records, titled "Skin" became her first entry on the US Billboard Hot 100. In 2023, both of her singles "Nonsense" and "Feather" also appeared on the Hot 100, with the latter also marking her first number one on the US Pop songs chart. In 2024, Carpenter found success with the singles "Espresso", "Please Please Please" and "Taste" which all peaked in the top three on the Hot 100. All three songs peaked at number one on the UK singles chart while the first two also peaked atop the Billboard Global 200 chart. In 2025, she gained her second number one on the Hot 100 (first debut) and fourth number one in the UK with "Manchild".

== Songs ==
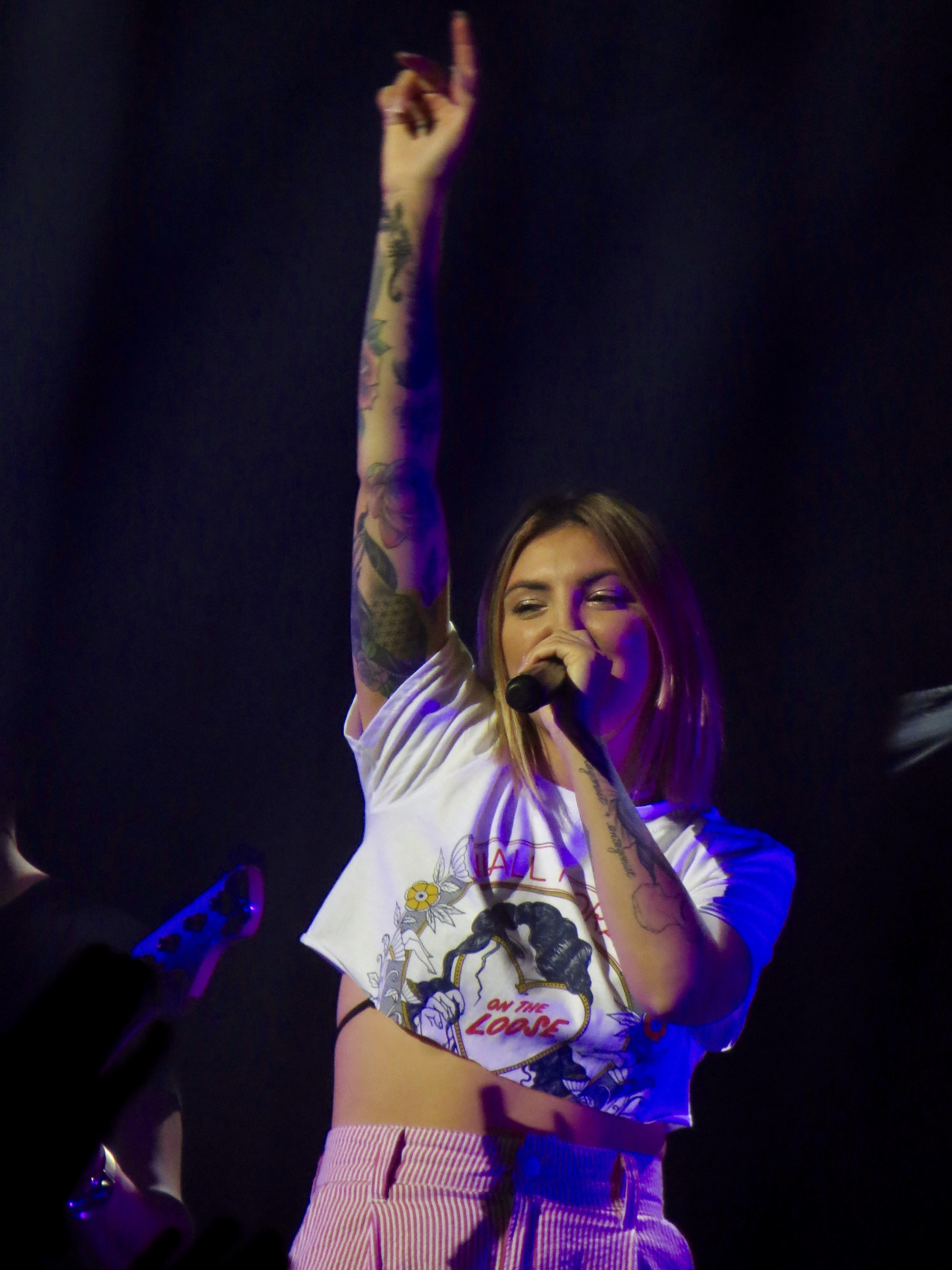
Julia Michaels has co-written several Carpenter songs.

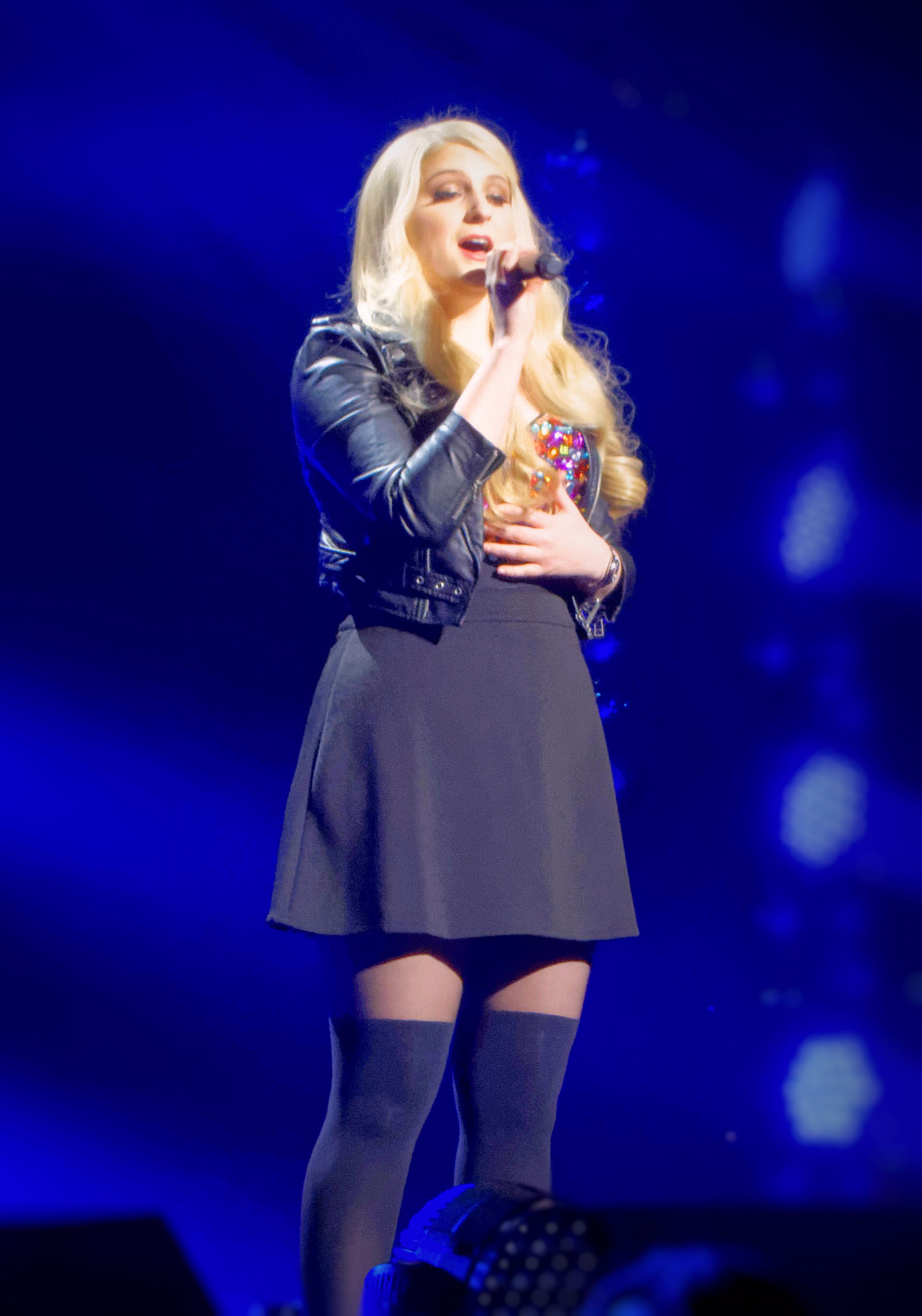
Two Carpenter songs were co-written by Meghan Trainor.

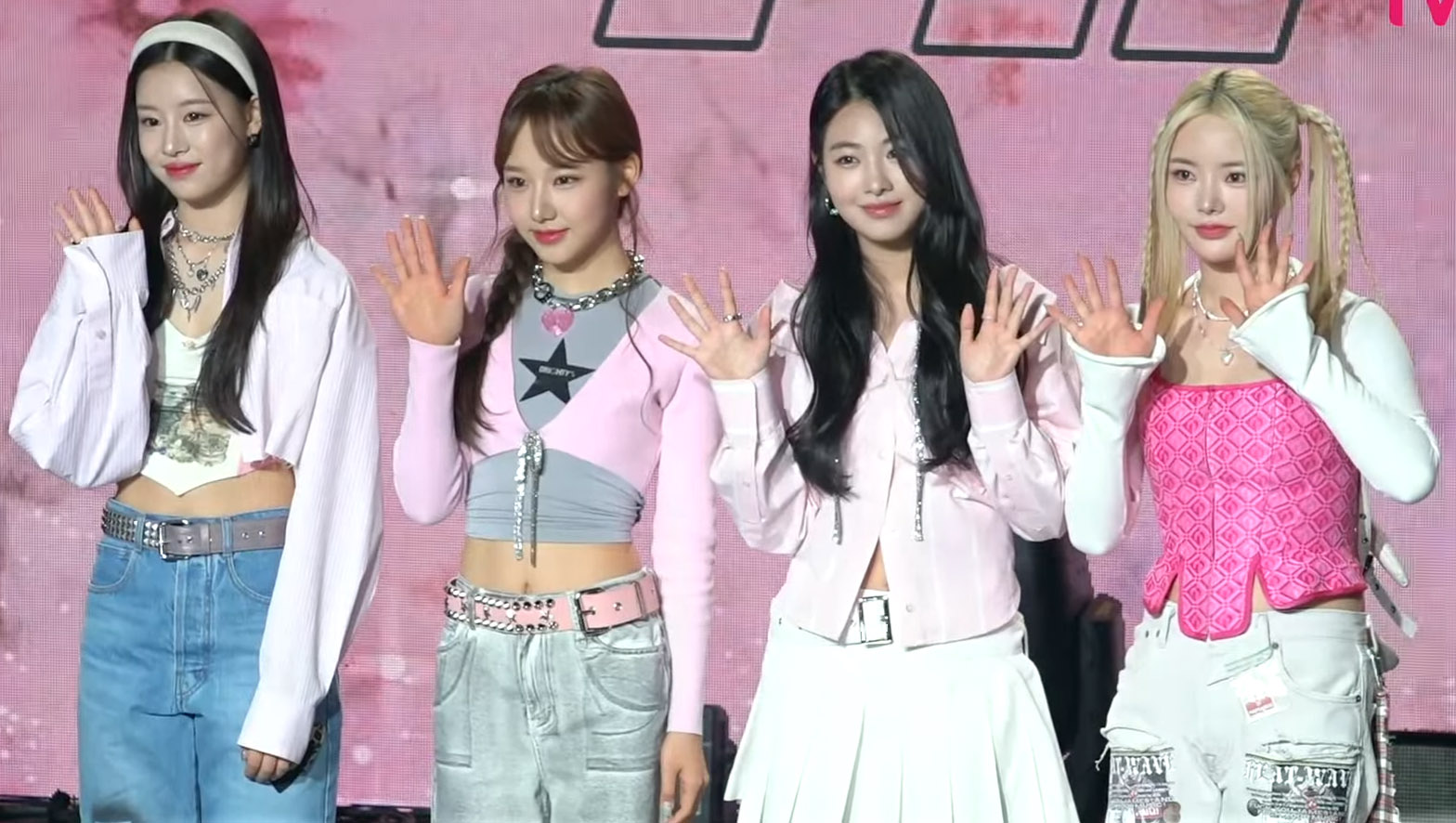
Fifty Fifty and Carpenter collaborated on the remix of "Cupid (Twin Ver.)".

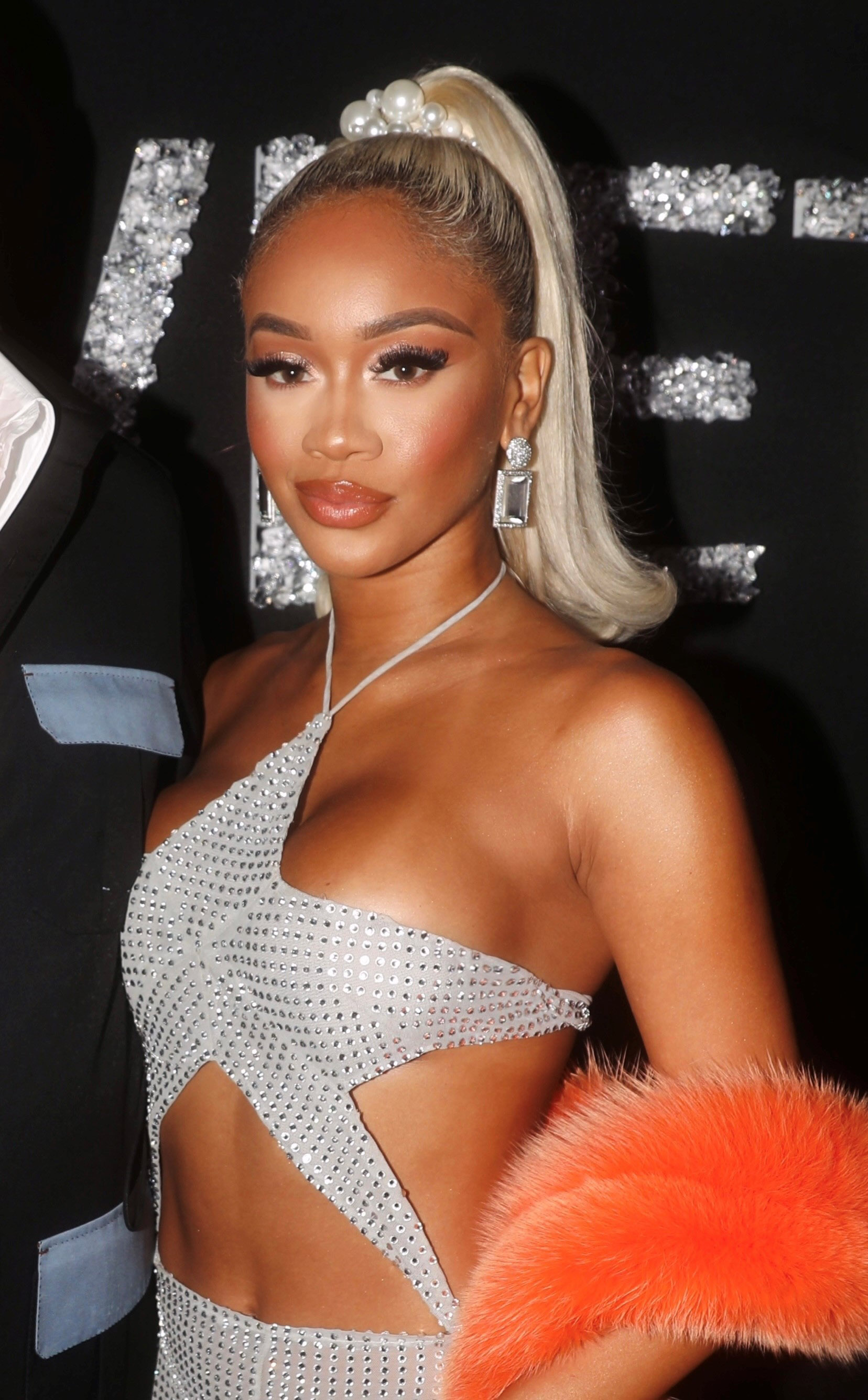
Saweetie features on "I Can't Stop Me".

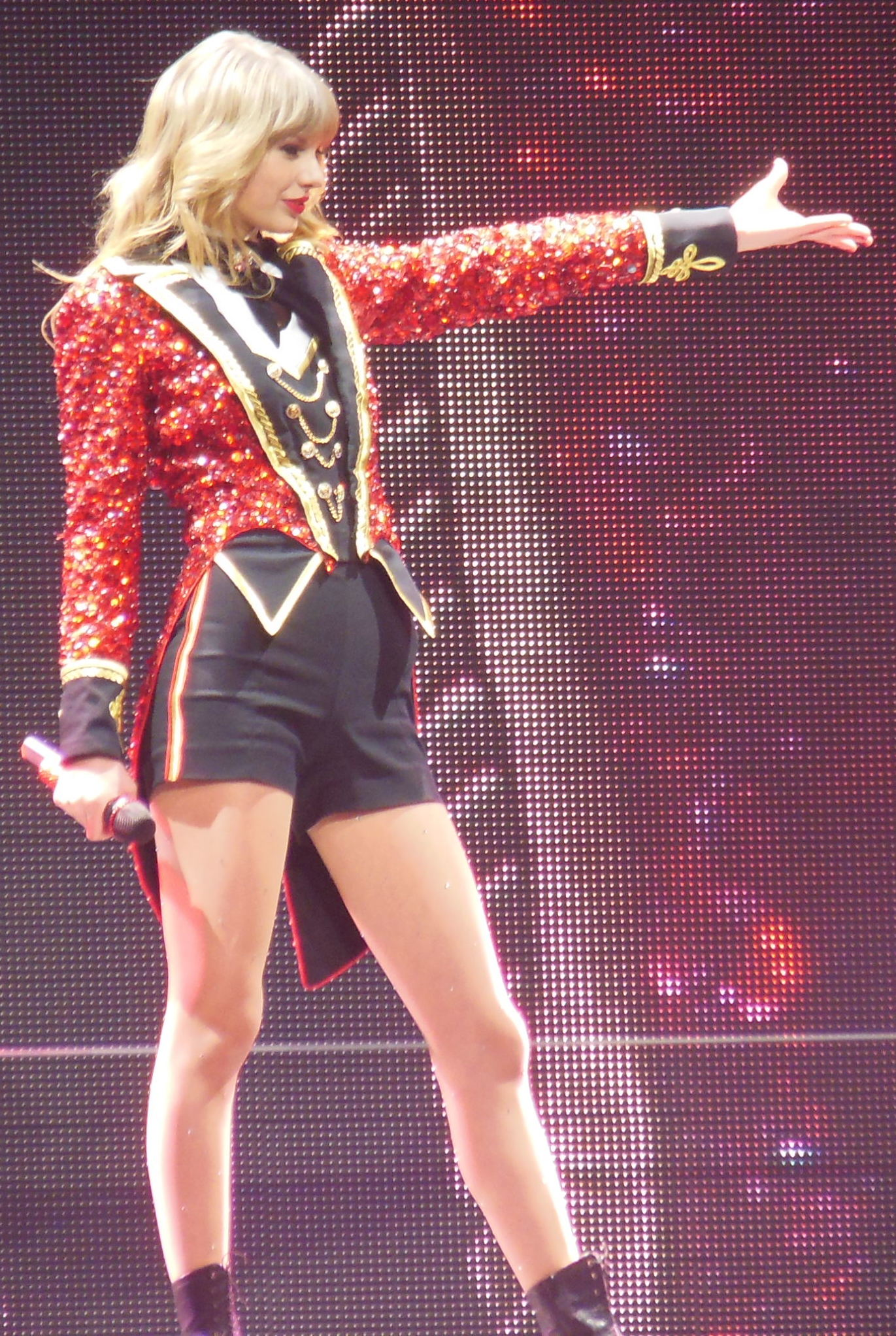
Carpenter covered Taylor Swift's "I Knew You Were Trouble".

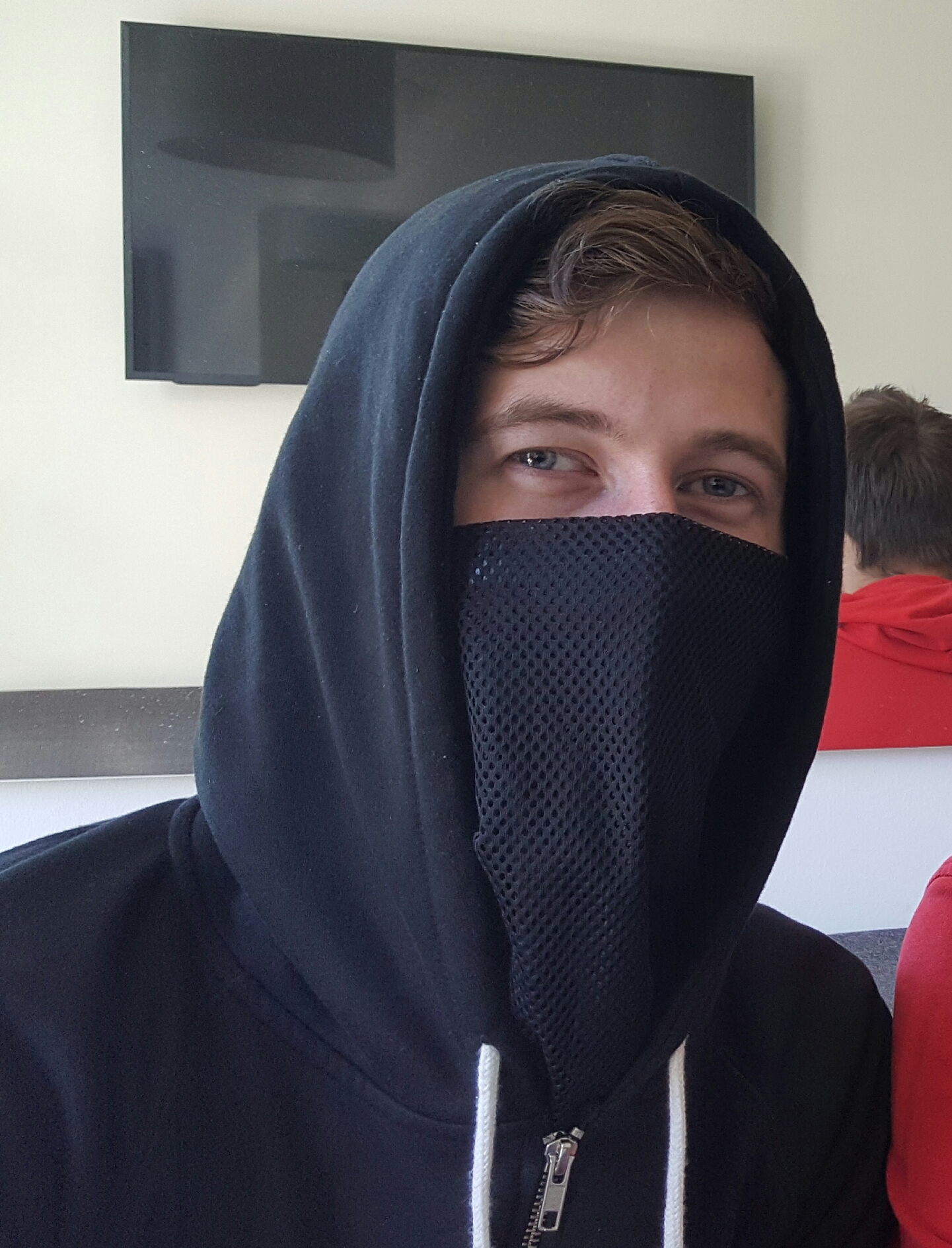
Alan Walker and Carpenter collaborated on "On My Way".

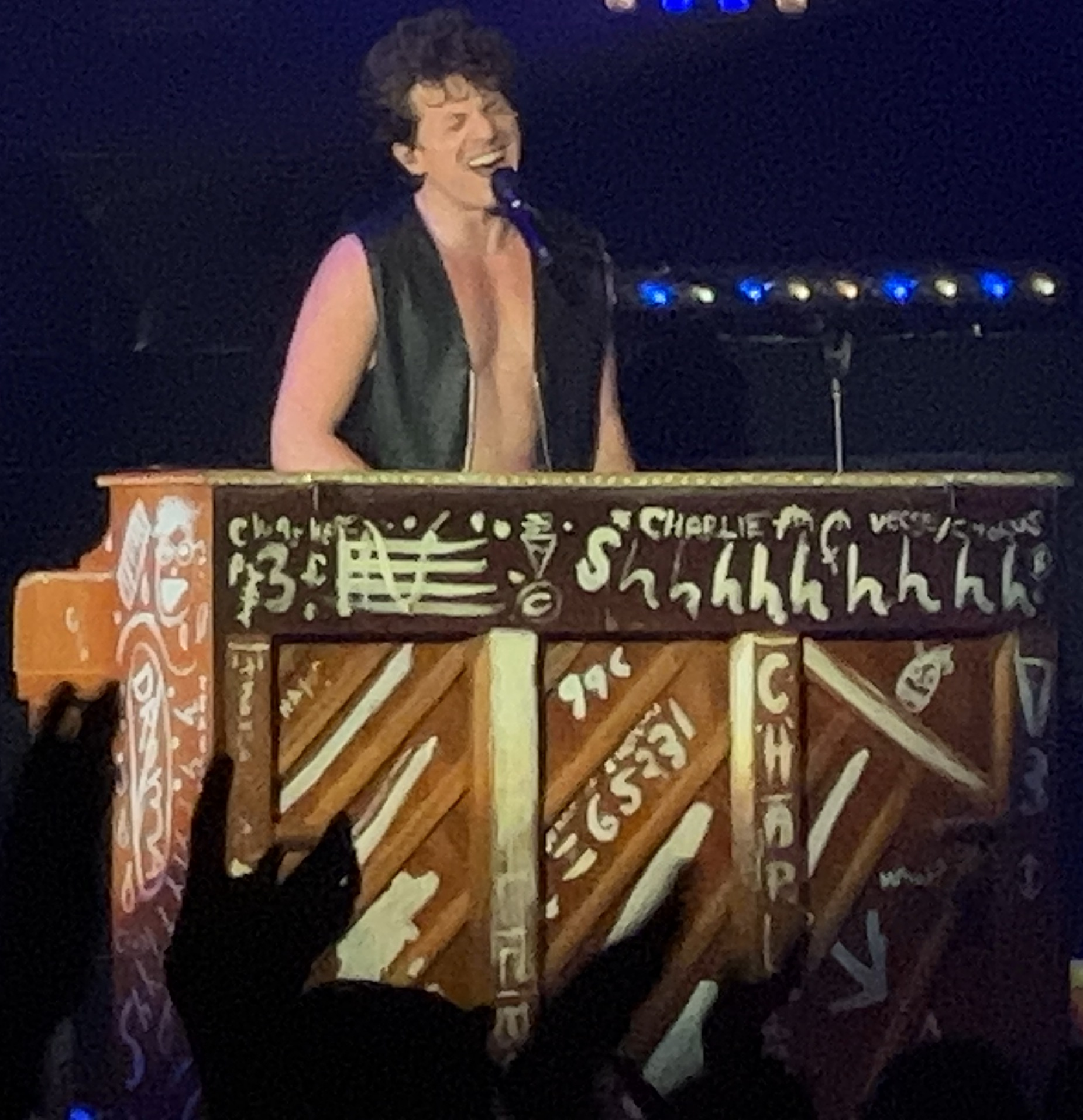
Carpenter features on the remix of "That's Not How This Works", wrote by Charlie Puth.

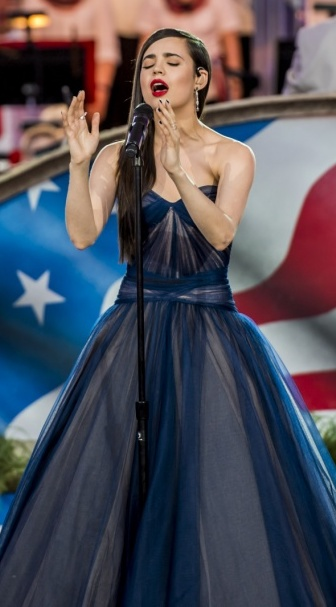
Carpenter and Sofia Carson released their song "Wildside".

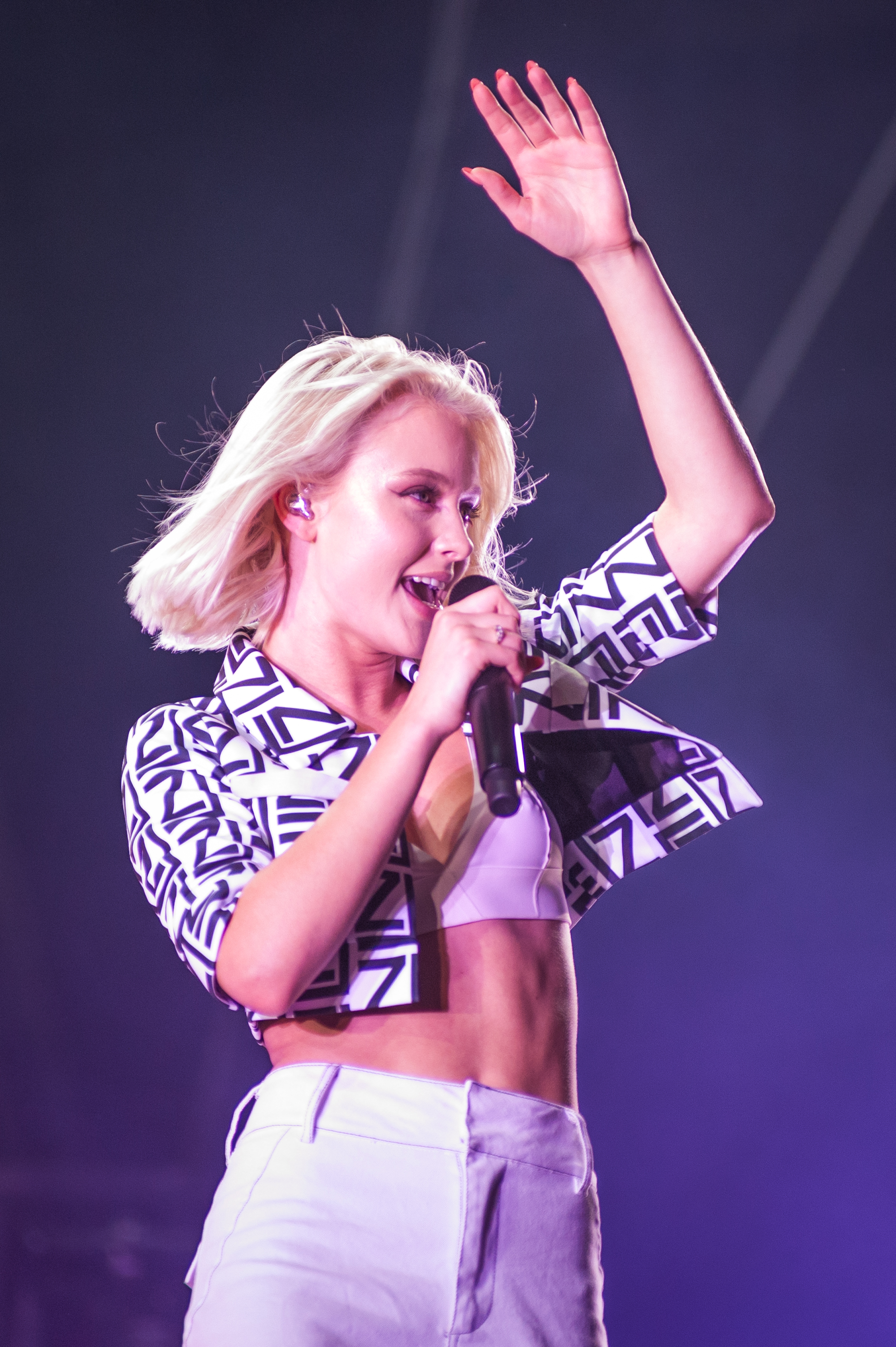
Zara Larsson collaborated with Sabrina on the remix of "Wow".

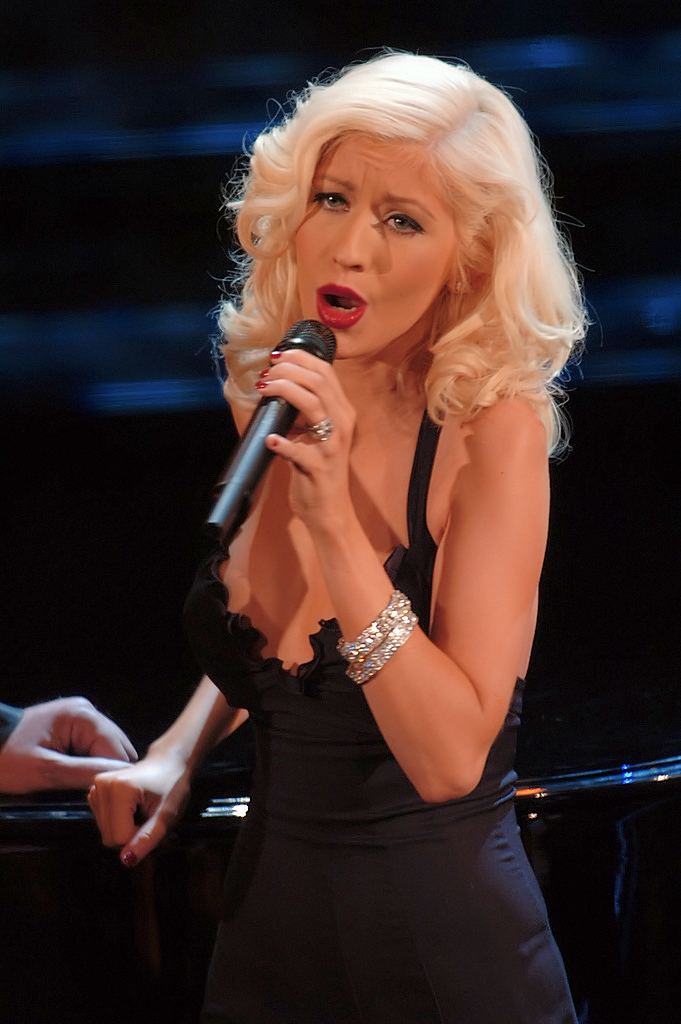
Carpenter covered Christina Aguilera's 1999 song "What a Girl Wants" with Aguilera herself in 2024

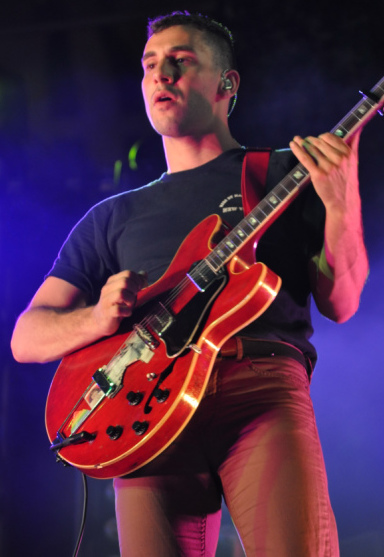
A few Short n' Sweet songs were co-written by Jack Antonoff.

Name of song, featured performers, writer(s), original release, and year of release
Song	Artist(s)	Writer(s)	Album(s)	Year	Ref.
"15 Minutes"	Sabrina Carpenter	Sabrina Carpenter	Short n' Sweet (Deluxe)	2025	
"A Dream Is a Wish Your Heart Makes/So This Is Love" (cover)	Sabrina Carpenter	Mack David; Al Hoffman; Jerry Livingston	—N/a	2016	
"All We Have Is Love"	Sabrina Carpenter	Sabrina Carpenter; Afshin Salmani; Josh Cumbee	Evolution	2016	
"Alien"	Jonas Blue and Sabrina Carpenter	Jonas Blue; Sabrina Carpenter; Janée Bennett	Blue (Japanese edition) and Singular: Act I (Japanese edition)	2018	
"Almost Love"	Sabrina Carpenter	Sabrina Carpenter; Steph Jones; Nate Campany; Mikkel Eriksen	Singular: Act I	2018	
"Already Over"	Sabrina Carpenter	Sabrina Carpenter; Julia Michaels	Emails I Can't Send	2022	
"A Nonsense Christmas"	Sabrina Carpenter	Sabrina Carpenter; Julian Bunetta; Steph Jones	Fruitcake	2022	
"Bad for Business"	Sabrina Carpenter	Sabrina Carpenter; Steph Jones	Emails I Can't Send	2022	
"Bad Reviews"	Sabrina Carpenter	Sabrina Carpenter	Short n' Sweet (Deluxe)	2025	
"Bad Time"	Sabrina Carpenter	Sabrina Carpenter; Oscar Görres; Julia Karlsson	Singular: Act I	2018	
"Because I Liked a Boy"	Sabrina Carpenter	Sabrina Carpenter; Julia Michaels	Emails I Can't Send	2022	
"Bed Chem"	Sabrina Carpenter	Sabrina Carpenter; Amy Allen; Julia Michaels; John Ryan; Ian Kirkpatrick	Short n' Sweet	2024	
"Best Thing I Got"	Sabrina Carpenter	John Gordon; Julie Frost	Can't Blame a Girl for Trying and Eyes Wide Open	2014	
"Bet U Wanna"	Sabrina Carpenter	Sabrina Carpenter; Steph Jones	Emails I Can't Send	2022	
"Blueberries"	Sabrina Carpenter	Samantha Brown; Zach Sobiech	Clouds	2020	
"Bring Your Love"	Madonna and Sabrina Carpenter	Madonna Ciccone; Kevin Saunderson; Roy Holman; Shanna Jackson; Stuart Price	Confessions II	2026	
"Buy Me Presents"	Sabrina Carpenter	Sabrina Carpenter; Steph Jones; John Ryan	Fruitcake	2023	
"Can't Blame a Girl for Trying"	Sabrina Carpenter	Meghan Trainor; Al Anderson; Chris Gelbuda	Can't Blame a Girl for Trying and Eyes Wide Open	2014	
"Cindy Lou Who"	Sabrina Carpenter	Sabrina Carpenter; John Ryan; Amy Allen	Fruitcake	2023	
"Clouds"	Fin Argus and Sabrina Carpenter	Zach Sobiech	Clouds	2020	
"Coincidence"	Sabrina Carpenter	Sabrina Carpenter; Amy Allen; Julia Michaels; John Ryan; Ian Kirkpatrick	Short n' Sweet	2024	
"Cupid (Twin Ver.)" (remix)	Fifty Fifty and Sabrina Carpenter	Adam von Mentzer; Mac Felländer-Tsai; Louise Udin; Siahn; Ahin; Keena	The Beginning	2023	
"Darling I'm a Mess"	Sabrina Carpenter	Meghan Trainor; Lily Harrington	Eyes Wide Open	2015	
"Decode"	Sabrina Carpenter	Sabrina Carpenter; Julia Michaels	Emails I Can't Send	2022	
"Diamonds Are Forever"	Sabrina Carpenter	Sabrina Carpenter; Johan Carlsson; Ross Golan; Dallas Davidson	Singular: Act I	2018	
"Don't Smile"	Sabrina Carpenter	Sabrina Carpenter; Amy Allen; Steph Jones; John Ryan; Julian Bunetta	Short n' Sweet	2024	
"Don't Want It Back"	Sabrina Carpenter	Sabrina Carpenter; Steph Jones; Rob Persaud	Evolution	2016	
"Don't Worry I'll Make You Worry"	Sabrina Carpenter	Sabrina Carpenter; Amy Allen; Jack Antonoff	Man's Best Friend	2025	
"Dumb & Poetic"	Sabrina Carpenter	Sabrina Carpenter; Amy Allen; Julia Michaels; John Ryan	Short n' Sweet	2024	
"Emails I Can't Send"	Sabrina Carpenter	Sabrina Carpenter	Emails I Can't Send	2022	
"Espresso"	Sabrina Carpenter	Sabrina Carpenter; Amy Allen; Julian Bunetta; Steph Jones	Short n' Sweet	2024	
"Exhale"	Sabrina Carpenter	Sabrina Carpenter; Johan Carlsson; Ross Golan	Singular: Act II	2019	
"Eyes Wide Open"	Sabrina Carpenter	Jerrod Bettis; Audra Mae; Meghan Kabir	Eyes Wide Open	2015	
"Fast Times"	Sabrina Carpenter	Sabrina Carpenter; Julia Michaels	Emails I Can't Send	2022	
"Feather"	Sabrina Carpenter	Sabrina Carpenter; Amy Allen	Emails I Can't Send Fwd:	2023	
"Feels Like Loneliness"	Sabrina Carpenter	Sabrina Carpenter; Ido Zmishlany	Evolution	2016	
"First Love"	Lost Kings featuring Sabrina Carpenter	Albin Nedler; Brittany Amaradio; Kristoffer Fogelmark; Norris Shanholtz; Rami Yacoub; Robert Abisi	We Are Lost Kings (Japan EP)	2017	
"Fix Me Up"	Fin Argus and Sabrina Carpenter	Samantha Brown; Zach Sobiech	Clouds	2020	
"Go Go Juice"	Sabrina Carpenter	Sabrina Carpenter; Amy Allen; Jack Antonoff; John Ryan	Man's Best Friend	2025	
"Goodbye"	Sabrina Carpenter	Sabrina Carpenter; Amy Allen; Jack Antonoff	Man's Best Friend	2025	
"Good Graces"	Sabrina Carpenter	Sabrina Carpenter; Amy Allen; Julia Michaels; John Ryan; Julian Bunetta	Short n' Sweet	2024	
"Hands"	Mike Perry with The Vamps and Sabrina Carpenter	Connor Ball; Tristan Evans; James McVey; Brad Simpson; Sam Preston; Rick Parkhouse; George Tizzard; Rachel Furner; Mikael Persson; Dimitri Vangelis; Andreas Wiman	Night & Day	2017	
"Honeymoon Fades"	Sabrina Carpenter	Sabrina Carpenter; Akil King; Bianca Atterberry; Daoud Anthony; Anthony M. Jones	—N/a	2020	
"Hold Tight"	Sabrina Carpenter featuring Uhmeer	Sabrina Carpenter; Mike Sabath; Brett McLaughlin	Singular: Act I	2018	
"House Tour"	Sabrina Carpenter	Sabrina Carpenter; Amy Allen; Jack Antonoff; John Ryan	Man's Best Friend	2025	
"How Many Things"	Sabrina Carpenter	Sabrina Carpenter	Emails I Can't Send	2022	
"How to Go to Confession"	Sabrina Carpenter	Samantha Brown; Zach Sobiech	Clouds	2020	
"I Can't Stop Me"	Sabrina Carpenter featuring Saweetie	Sabrina Carpenter; Brett McLaughlin; Mikkel Eriksen; Diamonté Harper; Gino Borri	Singular: Act II	2019	
"I Knew You Were Trouble" (cover)	Sabrina Carpenter	Taylor Swift; Max Martin; Shellback	Spotify Singles	2023	
"I Still Haven't Found What I'm Looking For" (cover)	Peter Hollens featuring Sabrina Carpenter	David Evans; Paul Hewson; Adam Clayton; Larry Mullen Jr.	Peter Hollens	2014	
"I'm Fakin"	Sabrina Carpenter	Sabrina Carpenter; Katie Pearlman; Jackson Morgan; Andrés Torres; Mauricio Rengifo	Singular: Act II	2019	
"In My Bed"	Sabrina Carpenter	Sabrina Carpenter; Steph Jones; Mike Sabath	Singular: Act II	2019	
"Is It New Years Yet?"	Sabrina Carpenter	Sabrina Carpenter; John Ryan; Amy Allen	Fruitcake	2023	
"Juno"	Sabrina Carpenter	Sabrina Carpenter; Amy Allen; John Ryan	Short n' Sweet	2024	
"Let Me Move You"	Sabrina Carpenter	Sabrina Carpenter; Mikkel Storleer Eriksen; Steph Jones; Tor Erik Hermansen	Work It	2020	
"Lie for Love"	Sabrina Carpenter	Brett McLaughlin; Bram Inscore	Sierra Burgess Is a Loser	2018	
"Lie to Girls"	Sabrina Carpenter	Sabrina Carpenter; Amy Allen; Jack Antonoff	Short n' Sweet	2024	
"Lonesome"	Sabrina Carpenter	Sabrina Carpenter; Skyler Stonestreet	Emails I Can't Send Fwd:	2023	
"Looking At Me"	Sabrina Carpenter	Sabrina Carpenter; Johan Carlsson; James Alan Ghaleb	Singular: Act II	2019	
"Manchild"	Sabrina Carpenter	Sabrina Carpenter; Amy Allen; Jack Antonoff	Man's Best Friend	2025	
"Mirage"	Sabrina Carpenter	Sabrina Carpenter; Nick Bailey; Jeff Halavacs; Ryan Ogren	Evolution	2016	
"Mona Lisa"	Sabrina Carpenter	Sabrina Carpenter; James Abrahart; Nate Campany; Jordan Johnson; Stefan Johnson; Marcus Lomax; Oliver Peterhof	Singular: Act I	2018	
"My Man on Willpower"	Sabrina Carpenter	Sabrina Carpenter; Amy Allen; Jack Antonoff; John Ryan	Man's Best Friend	2025	
"Needless to Say"	Sabrina Carpenter	Sabrina Carpenter; Amy Allen; John Ryan; Ian Kirkpatrick	Short n' Sweet (limited edition)	2024	
"Never Getting Laid"	Sabrina Carpenter	Sabrina Carpenter; Amy Allen; John Ryan	Man's Best Friend	2025	
"Nobody's Son"	Sabrina Carpenter	Sabrina Carpenter; Amy Allen; John Ryan	Man's Best Friend	2025	
"Nonsense"	Sabrina Carpenter	Sabrina Carpenter; Steph Jones	Emails I Can't Send	2022	
"No Words"	Sabrina Carpenter	Sabrina Carpenter; Ido Zmishlany	Evolution	2016	
"On My Way"	Alan Walker with Sabrina Carpenter and Farruko	Sabrina Carpenter; Julia Karlsson; Gunnar Greve; Franklin Jovani Martinez; Marcos G. Pérez; Fredrik Borch Olsen; Jesper Borgen; Carlos Efrén Reyes Rosado; Alan Walker; Øyvind Sauvik; Anders Frøen; Anton Rundberg	World of Walker	2019	
"On Purpose"	Sabrina Carpenter	Sabrina Carpenter; Ido Zmishlany	Evolution	2016	
"Opposite"	Sabrina Carpenter	Sabrina Carpenter; Amy Allen	Emails I Can't Send Fwd:	2023	
"Paris"	Sabrina Carpenter	Sabrina Carpenter; Brett McLaughlin; Jason Evigan	Singular: Act I	2018	
"Perfect Song"	Sabrina Carpenter	Olivia Noelle; Nick Lang; Darren Criss; Matt Morales	Royalties	2020	
"Please Please Please"	Sabrina Carpenter	Sabrina Carpenter; Jack Antonoff; Amy Allen	Short n' Sweet	2024	
"Prfct"	Sabrina Carpenter	Sabrina Carpenter; Rob Persaud; Jenna Andrews	Singular: Act I	2018	
"Pushing 20"	Sabrina Carpenter	Sabrina Carpenter; Oak Felder; Paul Guy Shelton II	Singular: Act II	2019	
"Read Your Mind"	Sabrina Carpenter	Sabrina Carpenter; Skyler Stonestreet	Emails I Can't Send	2022	
"Rescue Me"	Sabrina Carpenter	Sabrina Carpenter; Jintae Ko; Tanner Underwood	Teen Beach 2	2015	
"Right Now"	Sabrina Carpenter	Sabrina Carpenter; Jordan Higgins; Lindsay Rush	Eyes Wide Open	2015	
"Run and Hide"	Sabrina Carpenter	Sabrina Carpenter; Jimmy Robbins	Evolution	2016	
"Santa Doesn't Know You Like I Do"	Sabrina Carpenter	Sabrina Carpenter; Julian Bunetta; Amy Allen	Fruitcake	2023	
"Seamless"	Sabrina Carpenter	Sabrina Carpenter; Jon Levine; Chelsea Lena	Eyes Wide Open	2015	
"Shadows"	Sabrina Carpenter	Sabrina Carpenter; Steph Jones; Rob Persaud	Evolution	2016	
"Sharpest Tool"	Sabrina Carpenter	Sabrina Carpenter; Amy Allen; Jack Antonoff	Short n' Sweet	2024	
"Sign of the Times" (cover)	Jasmine Thompson and Sabrina Carpenter	Harry Styles; Jeff Bhasker; Tyler Johnson; Ryan Nasci; Mitch Rowland; Alex Salibian	—N/a	2017	
"Skin"	Sabrina Carpenter	Sabrina Carpenter; Tia Scola; Ryan McMahon	—N/a	2021	
"Skinny Dipping"	Sabrina Carpenter	Sabrina Carpenter; Julia Michaels	Emails I Can't Send	2021	
"Slim Pickins"	Sabrina Carpenter	Sabrina Carpenter; Amy Allen; Jack Antonoff	Short n' Sweet	2024	
"Smile"	Sabrina Carpenter	Adrian Newman; Tiffany Fred	Disney Fairies: Faith, Trust, and Pixie Dust	2012	
"Smoke and Fire"	Sabrina Carpenter	Sabrina Carpenter; Ido Zmishlany	—N/a	2016	
"Space"	Sabrina Carpenter	Sabrina Carpenter; Missy Modell; Daniel Kyriakides	Evolution	2016	
"Stand Out"	Sabrina Carpenter	Sabrina Carpenter; Rune Westberg; Stevie Scott	How to Build a Better Boy	2014	
"Sue Me"	Sabrina Carpenter	Sabrina Carpenter; Oak Felder; Steph Jones; Trevor Brown; William Zaire Simmons	Singular: Act I	2018	
"Sugar Talking"	Sabrina Carpenter	Sabrina Carpenter; Amy Allen; John Ryan	Man's Best Friend	2025	
"Take Off All Your Cool"	Sabrina Carpenter	Sabrina Carpenter; Oak Felder; Steph Jones; Trevor Brown; Zaire Koalo	Singular: Act II	2019	
"Take on the World"	Rowan Blanchard and Sabrina Carpenter	Matthew Tishler; Maria Christensen; Shridhar Solanki	—N/a	2014	
"Take You Back"	Sabrina Carpenter	Sabrina Carpenter; Jonas Jeberg; Brett McLaughlin; Chloe Angelides	Singular: Act II	2019	
"Taste"	Sabrina Carpenter	Sabrina Carpenter; Amy Allen; Julia Michaels; John Ryan; Ian Kirkpatrick	Short n' Sweet	2024	
"Tears"	Sabrina Carpenter	Sabrina Carpenter; Amy Allen; John Ryan	Man's Best Friend	2025	
"Tell Em"	Sabrina Carpenter	Sabrina Carpenter; Bianca Atterberry; Sidney Swift; Dayyon Alexander Drinkard	Singular: Act II	2019	
"That's Not How This Works" (Sabrina's version)	Charlie Puth with Dan + Shay and Sabrina Carpenter	Charlie Puth; Dan Smyers; Jordan Reynolds	—N/a	2023	
"The Life of a Showgirl"	Taylor Swift featuring Sabrina Carpenter	Taylor Swift; Max Martin; Shellback	The Life of a Showgirl	2025	
"The Middle of Starting Over"	Sabrina Carpenter	Jim McGorman; Robb Vallier; Michelle Moyer	Can't Blame a Girl for Trying and Eyes Wide Open	2014	
"Things I Wish You Said"	Sabrina Carpenter	Sabrina Carpenter; Steph Jones	Emails I Can't Send Fwd:	2023	
"Thumbs"	Sabrina Carpenter	Priscilla Renea; Steve Mac	Evolution	2016	
"Too Young"	Sabrina Carpenter	Sabrina Carpenter; Jon Ingoldsby	Eyes Wide Open	2015	
"Tornado Warnings"	Sabrina Carpenter	Sabrina Carpenter; Julia Michaels	Emails I Can't Send	2022	
"Tricky"	Shoffy featuring Sabrina Carpenter	Sabrina Carpenter; Jake Torrey; Alexander Shofler	Flash	2020	
"Two Young Hearts"	Sabrina Carpenter	Ben Berger; Audra Mae; Ryan McMahon	Eyes Wide Open	2015	
"Vicious"	Sabrina Carpenter	Sabrina Carpenter; Amy Allen	Emails I Can't Send	2022	
"We Almost Broke Up Again Last Night"	Sabrina Carpenter	Sabrina Carpenter; Amy Allen; Jack Antonoff	Man's Best Friend	2025	
"We'll Be the Stars"	Sabrina Carpenter	Skyler Stonestreet; Cameron Walker-Wright; Steven Solomon	Eyes Wide Open	2015	
"What a Girl Wants" (Spotify Anniversaries version)	Christina Aguilera featuring Sabrina Carpenter	Guy Roche; Shelly Peiken	The 25th Anniversary of Christina Aguilera (Spotify Anniversaries Live)	2024	
"When Did You Get Hot?"	Sabrina Carpenter	Sabrina Carpenter; Amy Allen; Jack Antonoff; John Ryan	Man's Best Friend	2025	
"White Flag"	Sabrina Carpenter	Cara Salimando; Scott Harris; Matt Squire	Can't Blame a Girl for Trying and Eyes Wide Open	2014	
"White Xmas" (cover)	Sabrina Carpenter	Irving Berlin	Fruitcake	2023	
"Why"	Sabrina Carpenter	Sabrina Carpenter; Jonas Jeberg; Brett McLaughlin	Singular: Act I (Japanese edition)	2018	
"Wildside"	Sabrina Carpenter and Sofia Carson	Sabrina Carpenter; Chelsea Lena; Emanuel Kiriakou; Evan Bogart; Jens Koerkemeier	Your Favorite Songs from 100 Disney Channel Original Movies	2016	
"Wow" (remix)	Zara Larsson featuring Sabrina Carpenter	Sabrina Carpenter; Brittany Amaradio; Christopher Comstock; Thomas Eriksen; Joakim Haukaas; Madison Love	—N/a	2020	
"You're a Mean One, Mr. Grinch" (cover)	Lindsey Stirling featuring Sabrina Carpenter	Dr. Seuss; Albert Hague	Warmer in the Winter	2017	
"You Need Me Now?"	Girl in Red featuring Sabrina Carpenter	Matias Tellez; Marie Ulven; Sabrina Carpenter	I'm Doing It Again Baby!	2024	
"Your Love's Like"	Sabrina Carpenter	Sabrina Carpenter; Matthew Tishler; Philip Bentley; Lindsey Lee	Eyes Wide Open	2015	
