= List of Sabrina Carpenter concert tours =

Sabrina Carpenter concert tours
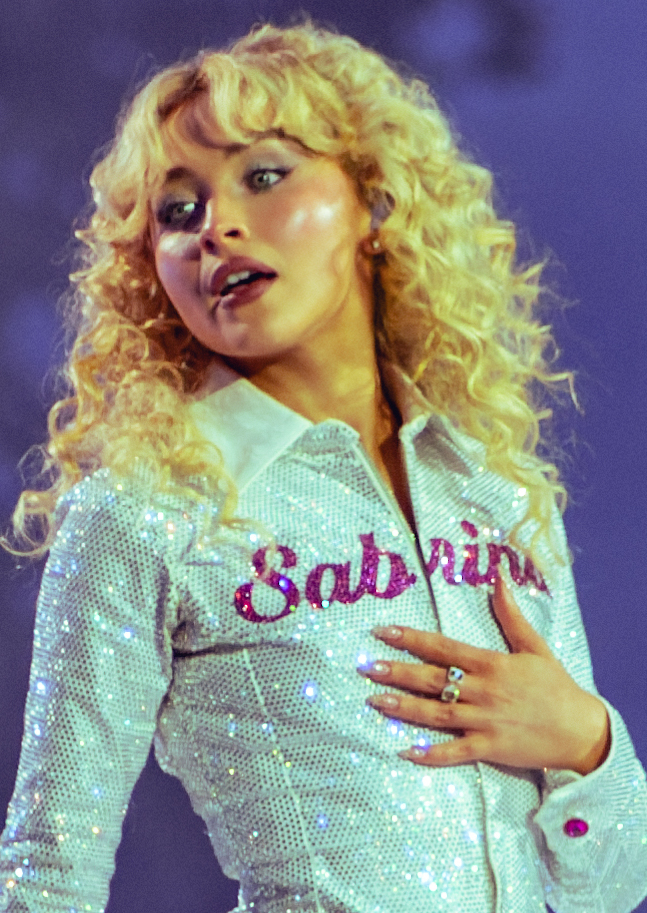
- Carpenter at the BST Hyde Park in 2025
- Concert tours: 5

The American singer Sabrina Carpenter has performed in five concert tours since 2016. Her first concert tour was the Evolution Tour, held in support of her second studio album, Evolution (2016). While performing the tour's European leg in May 2017, she simultaneously served as the opening act for The Vamps' Middle of the Night Tour. Following the completion of the tours in May 2017, Carpenter served as the supporting act for Ariana Grande's Dangerous Woman Tour stops in Brazil. She then went on to lead The De-Tour, her second tour as a headliner.

After a two-year gap, Carpenter embarked on the Singular Tour in March 2019, which took her to Asia for the first time. She then embarked on the Emails I Can't Send Tour in 2022, performing in Asia, Europe, North America and South America with a total of 80 shows. In August 2023, Carpenter began supporting Taylor Swift on The Eras Tour, opening the tour's Latin America, Australia and Singapore shows. Carpenter's Short n' Sweet Tour, held in support of her sixth studio album, Short n' Sweet (2024), began in September 2024 and concluded in November 2025.

== Concert tours ==
| Title | Dates | Associated album | Continent(s) | Shows |
|---|---|---|---|---|
| Evolution Tour | October 18, 2016 – May 22, 2017 | Evolution | Europe; North America | 42 |
| The De-Tour | July 6 – August 27, 2017 | —N/a | North America | 35 |
| Singular Tour | March 2 – April 11, 2019 | Singular: Act I Singular: Act II | Asia; North America | 21 |
| Emails I Can't Send Tour | September 29, 2022 – August 4, 2023 | Emails I Can't Send | Asia; Europe; North America; South America | 80 |
| Short n' Sweet Tour | September 23, 2024 – November 23, 2025 | Short n' Sweet | Europe; North America | 72 |

== Evolution Tour (2016–2017) ==
Evolution Tour
- Tour by Sabrina Carpenter
- Promotional poster
- Associated album: Evolution
- Start date: October 18, 2016
- End date: May 22, 2017
- Legs: 2
- No. of shows: 42

Sabrina Carpenter concert chronology
- Evolution Tour (2016–2017); The De-Tour (2017)

The Evolution Tour was the first headlining concert tour by American singer Sabrina Carpenter, in support of her second studio album Evolution (2016). The tour began on October 18, 2016, in Nashville, Tennessee, and concluded on May 22, 2017, in Milan, Italy.

=== Background ===
On September 4, 2016, a day after the announcement of Evolution, Carpenter announced that she would be going on her first headlining tour, entitled the Evolution Tour. That same day, she also announced the tour dates for the North American leg of the tour. On March 1, 2017, Carpenter announced the European Leg of the tour along with the dates.

=== Setlist ===
This setlist is from the show in Nashville on October 18, 2016. It does not represent all concerts for the duration of the tour.

1. "Smoke and Fire"
2. "Feels Like Loneliness"
3. "No Words"
4. "Heathens"
5. "Wildside"
6. "Can't Blame a Girl for Trying"
7. "Run and Hide"
8. "We'll Be the Stars"
9. "Thumbs"
10. "Mirage"
11. "Don't Want It Back"
12. "Hotline Bling"
13. "All We Have Is Love"
14. "Space"
15. "Eyes Wide Open"
16. "On Purpose"

Encore

17. "Shadows"

=== Shows ===
List of 2016 shows
| Date (2016) | City | Country | Venue |
|---|---|---|---|
| October 18 | Nashville | United States | Rocketown |
| October 21 | Atlanta | United States | The Loft |
| October 22 | San Antonio | United States | Studio Theater at The Tobin Center |
| October 23 | Austin | United States | 3Ten |
| October 24 | Dallas | United States | Trees |
| October 27 | West Hollywood | United States | The Roxy Theatre |
| October 29 | Santa Barbara | United States | Lobero Theatre |
| October 30 | San Francisco | United States | Slim's |
| November 1 | Santa Ana | United States | Constellation Room |
| November 3 | Seattle | United States | Nuemos |
| November 5 | Portland | United States | Hawthorne Theatre |
| November 7 | Denver | United States | Bluebird Theater |
| November 8 | Omaha | United States | Slowdown |
| November 10 | Kansas City | United States | Recordbar |
| November 11 | Burnsville | United States | The Garage |
| November 13 | Indianapolis | United States | Deluxe at Old National Centre |
| November 14 | Pontiac | United States | Pike Room |
| November 16 | Toronto | Canada | Mod Club |
| November 17 | Buffalo | United States | Buffalo Iron Works |
| November 18 | Albany | United States | The Hollow |
| November 19 | Deer Park | United States | Tanger Outlets |
| November 21 | New York City | United States | Highline Ballroom |
| November 23 | Cambridge | United States | The Sinclair |
| November 25 | Freehold | United States | iPlay America |
| November 26 | Baltimore | United States | Soundstage Baltimore |
| November 27 | Philadelphia | United States | The Foundry at The Fillmore Philadelphia |
| November 29 | Vienna | United States | Jammin Java |
| November 30 | Pittsburgh | United States | Stage AE |
| December 3 | Cleveland Heights | United States | Grog Shop |
| December 4 | Columbus | United States | A and R Music Bar |
| December 5 | Milwaukee | United States | Turner Hall Ballroom |
| December 6 | Chicago | United States | Schubas Tavern |
| December 10 | St. Petersburg | United States | State Theatre |
| December 11 | Jacksonville | United States | Jack Rabbits |
| December 13 | Charlotte | United States | McGlohon Theatre at Spirit Square |
| December 14 (Note: Originally booked for December 2, 2016, the Cincinnati performance was rescheduled due to scheduling conflicts with the Jingle Ball Tour 2016.) | Cincinnati | United States | Twentieth Century Theatre |
| December 19 (Note: Originally booked for December 9, 2016, the Fort Lauderdale performance was rescheduled due to scheduling conflicts with the Jingle Ball Tour 2016.) | Fort Lauderdale | United States | Parker Playhouse |

List of 2017 shows
| Date (2017) | City | Country | Venue |
|---|---|---|---|
| May 3 | Glasgow | Scotland | O2 ABC Glasgow |
| May 12 | Paris | France | Les Etoiles |
| May 20 | Antwerp | Belgium | TRIX Music Center |
| May 21 | Cologne | Germany | LUXOR |
| May 22 | Milan | Italy | Magazzini Generali |

== The De-Tour (2017) ==
The De-Tour
- North American tour by Sabrina Carpenter
- Promotional poster
- Start date: July 6, 2017
- End date: August 27, 2017
- No. of shows: 35

Sabrina Carpenter concert chronology
- Evolution Tour (2016–2017); The De-Tour (2017); Singular Tour (2019)

The De-Tour was the second headlining concert tour by American singer Sabrina Carpenter. The tour began in Vancouver, British Columbia, on July 6, 2017, and concluded in Toronto, Ontario, on August 27, 2017. Carpenter announced the tour on April 26, 2017, along with the shows and the opening acts being New Hope Club and Alex Aiono.

=== Setlist ===
This setlist is from the show in Vancouver on July 6, 2017. It does not represent all concerts for the duration of the tour.

1. "Feels Like Loneliness"
2. "Smoke and Fire"
3. "No Words"
4. "Hands"
5. "Run and Hide"
6. "Space"
7. "Mirage"
8. "Thumbs"
9. "All We Have Is Love"
10. "Into You"
11. "Can't Blame a Girl for Trying"
12. "We'll Be the Stars"
13. "Eyes Wide Open"
14. "Shadows"
15. "Wildside"
16. "Why"
17. "On Purpose"

Encore

18. "Alone Together"

=== Shows ===
List of 2017 shows
| Date | City | Country | Venue | Opening act(s) |
|---|---|---|---|---|
| July 6 | Vancouver | Canada | Vogue Theatre | Alex Aiono; New Hope Club |
| July 8 | Edmonton | Canada | Winspear Centre | Alex Aiono; New Hope Club |
| July 9 | Calgary | Canada | Calgary Stampede | Alex Aiono; New Hope Club |
| July 11 | Seattle | United States | Neptune Theatre | Alex Aiono; New Hope Club |
| July 13 | Portland | United States | Crystal Ballroom | Alex Aiono; New Hope Club |
| July 15 | San Francisco | United States | The Masonic | Alex Aiono; New Hope Club |
| July 16 | Santa Rosa | United States | Ruth Finley Person Theater | Alex Aiono; New Hope Club |
| July 18 | San Diego | United States | Balboa Theatre | Alex Aiono; New Hope Club |
| July 19 | Anaheim | United States | House of Blues | Alex Aiono; New Hope Club |
| July 21 | Los Angeles | United States | The Wiltern | Alex Aiono; New Hope Club |
| July 22 | Phoenix | United States | Comerica Theatre | Alex Aiono; New Hope Club |
| July 24 | Denver | United States | Paramount Theatre | Alex Aiono; New Hope Club |
| July 26 | Dallas | United States | Majestic Theatre | Alex Aiono; New Hope Club |
| July 28 | New Orleans | United States | Saenger Theatre | Alex Aiono; New Hope Club |
| July 29 | Hot Springs | United States | Timberwood Amphitheater | Alex Aiono; New Hope Club |
| July 30 | Houston | United States | Revention Music Center | Alex Aiono; New Hope Club |
| August 2 | Jacksonville | United States | Florida Theatre | Alex Aiono; New Hope Club |
| August 4 | Miami Beach | United States | The Fillmore Miami Beach | Alex Aiono; New Hope Club |
| August 5 | Orlando | United States | Walt Disney Theater | Alex Aiono; New Hope Club |
| August 6 | Atlanta | United States | The Tabernacle | Alex Aiono; New Hope Club |
| August 8 | Nashville | United States | Ryman Auditorium | Alex Aiono; New Hope Club |
| August 9 | Indianapolis | United States | Murat Theatre | Alex Aiono; New Hope Club |
| August 11 | West Allis | United States | Wisconsin State Fair | Alex Aiono; New Hope Club |
| August 12 | Detroit | United States | The Fillmore | Alex Aiono; New Hope Club |
| August 13 | Tinley Park | United States | Hollywood Casino Amphitheatre | Alex Aiono; New Hope Club |
| August 15 | Hamburg | United States | Erie County Fair | Alex Aiono; New Hope Club |
| August 16 | Pittsburgh | United States | Byham Theater | Alex Aiono; New Hope Club |
| August 17 | Cleveland | United States | Connor Palace | Alex Aiono; New Hope Club |
| August 19 | Hershey | United States | Hersheypark Stadium | Alex Aiono; New Hope Club |
| August 20 | Boston | United States | House of Blues | Alex Aiono; New Hope Club |
| August 22 | Montclair | United States | Wellmont Theater | Alex Aiono; New Hope Club |
| August 23 | Philadelphia | United States | The Fillmore | Alex Aiono; New Hope Club |
| August 25 | Charlotte | United States | Belk Theater | Alex Aiono; New Hope Club |
| August 26 | Timonium | United States | Maryland State Fair | Alex Aiono; New Hope Club |
| August 27 (Note: The show in Toronto on August 27, 2017, was a part of Family Channel's Big Ticket Summer Concert.) | Toronto | Canada | Budweiser Stage | —N/a |

== Singular Tour (2019) ==
Singular Tour
- Tour by Sabrina Carpenter
- Promotional poster
- Associated albums: Singular: Act I; Singular: Act II
- Start date: March 2, 2019
- End date: April 11, 2019
- Legs: 2
- No. of shows: 16 in North America; 5 in Asia; 21 Total

Sabrina Carpenter concert chronology
- The De-Tour (2017); Singular Tour (2019); Emails I Can't Send Tour (2022–2023)

The Singular Tour was the third concert tour by American singer Sabrina Carpenter, in support of her third and fourth studio albums, Singular: Act I (2018) and Singular: Act II (2019). The tour began on March 2, 2019, in Orlando, Florida at the Universal Studios Park and concluded on April 11, 2019, in Singapore at the Kallang Theater.

=== Background ===
On December 21, 2018, Carpenter announced the Asian leg of the Singular Tour. On January 28, 2019, Carpenter announced the North American leg of the tour along with the addition of the Singapore show on the Asian leg. On February 1, 2019, tickets for both legs went on sale. On February 22, 2019, Carpenter announced that Maggie Lindemann would be the opening act for the North American leg of the tour.

=== Setlist ===
This setlist is from the show in Orlando on March 2, 2019. It does not represent all concerts for the duration of the tour.

1. "Almost Love"
2. "Bad Time"
3. "Alien"
4. "Mona Lisa"
5. "Diamonds Are Forever"/ "Diamonds"
6. "Thumbs"
7. "On Purpose"
8. "Pushing 20"
9. "All We Have Is Love"
10. "Why"
11. "prfct"
12. "Paris"
13. "Hold Tight"
14. "Sue Me"

Encore

15. "Exhale"

=== Shows ===
List of 2019 shows
| Date (2019) | City | Country | Venue | Opening act(s) |
|---|---|---|---|---|
| March 2 (Note: The show in Orlando in March 2, 2019, is a part of Universal Orlando's 2019 Mardi Gras line-up) | Orlando | United States | Universal Studios Florida | —N/a |
| March 3 | Atlanta | United States | Buckhead Theatre | Maggie Lindemann |
| March 4 | Charlotte | United States | The Fillmore | Maggie Lindemann |
| March 6 | Philadelphia | United States | Theatre of Living Arts | Maggie Lindemann |
| March 7 | Boston | United States | Paradise Rock Club | Maggie Lindemann |
| March 9 | Montclair | United States | Wellmont Theatre | Maggie Lindemann |
| March 10 | Washington, D.C. | United States | 9:30 Club | Maggie Lindemann |
| March 12 | New York City | United States | Irving Plaza | Maggie Lindemann |
| March 14 | Toronto | Canada | The Opera House | Maggie Lindemann |
| March 15 | Mashantucket | United States | Grand Theater at Foxwoods | —N/a |
| March 17 | Detroit | United States | St. Andrew's Hall | Maggie Lindemann |
| March 18 | Chicago | United States | House of Blues | Maggie Lindemann |
| March 21 (Note: The show in Las Vegas on March 21, 2019, was presented by iHeartRadio) | Las Vegas | United States | House of Blues | —N/a |
| March 22 | San Diego | United States | House of Blues | Maggie Lindemann |
| March 24 | Berkeley | United States | UC Theatre | Maggie Lindemann |
| March 25 | Los Angeles | United States | Henry Fonda Theatre | Maggie Lindemann |
| April 1 | Osaka | Japan | Namba Hatch | —N/a |
| April 2 | Nagoya | Japan | Diamond Hall | —N/a |
| April 4 | Tokyo | Japan | EX Theater Roppongi | —N/a |
| April 6 | Seoul | South Korea | Yes24 Live Hall | —N/a |
| April 11 | Singapore | | Kallang Theater | —N/a |

==== Cancelled shows ====
| Date (2019) | City | Country | Venue | Reason |
|---|---|---|---|---|
| April 9 | Manila | Philippines | New Frontier Theater | Unknown |

=== Personnel ===
- Sabrina Carpenter – vocals, bass (Note: Carpenter only plays the bass on the Singular Tour during "Paris")
- Sarah Carpenter – backing vocals
- Kat Cheng – backup dancer
- Andranita Smith-Shannon – backup dancer
- Caleb Nelson – guitar
- Tobias Urbanczyk – drums
- Korey Fells Jr. – keyboard
- Amber Park – creative direction
- Toogie Barcelo – choreography
- Fabien Herrera – lighting design (for wasted potential)
- Chad Fellers-Doughty – lighting design (for wasted potential)
- Kevin Labitan – lighting design (for wasted potential)
- Aron Fromm – design
- Robert Gotham – design
- Blunt Action – design
- Justin West – design
- Dustin Stanek – design
- After the Smoke – design
- Zouassi – design
- Marcello Ambriz – photography

Credits adapted from Instagram and Amber Park's website.

== See also ==
- Dangerous Woman Tour
- The Eras Tour
- Sabrina Carpenter discography
