= Paris (Sabrina Carpenter song) =

Promotional single by Sabrina Carpenter

from the album Singular: Act I
- Written: May 2017
- Released: October 25, 2018
- Studio: Chumba Meadows (Tarzana, California)
- Genre: R&B
- Length: 3:38
- Label: Hollywood
- Songwriters: Jason Evigan; Brett McLaughlin; Sabrina Carpenter
- Producers: Evigan; McLaughlin; Gian Stone

Music video
- "Paris" on YouTube

"Paris" is a song recorded by American singer-songwriter Sabrina Carpenter. It serves as the second track on her third studio album, Singular: Act I (2018). The track was written by Carpenter, Brett McLaughlin and Jason Evigan with Evigan handling the production and McLaughlin and Gian Stone vocal producing. The song was released by Hollywood Records as a promotional single from the album on October 25, 2018, alongside the pre-order for the album.

== Background and recording ==
"Paris" was written in May 2017 by Carpenter, Brett McLaughlin and Jason Evigan, after Carpenter's first trip to Paris for her 18th birthday. In the recording session at Chumba Meadows Studio in Tarzana, California, Leland asked Carpenter about her trip to Paris and Evigan start to play Eastern European chords and that's when they started to write the song. The song talks about Paris, the city of love, while thinking of a lover back in Los Angeles.

The song was released as a promotional single from Singular: Act I on October 25, 2018. Carpenter debuted the song at an album launch event in London a week after the albums release. She also performed other songs from the album, such as "Almost Love", "Sue Me" and "Mona Lisa". An acoustic version of the song was digitally released on August 21, 2019.

== Composition and critical reception ==
Musically, "Paris" is a three minutes and thirty five seconds R&B song. Lyrically, the song talks about Carpenter being in Paris, the city of love and being reminded of a Los Angeles lover while there. Carpenter stated that the lyric "Why'd it take so long for me to know this / Scared to put the water with the roses" is her favorite lyric from the album, she explained the lyric by saying "You are purposefully not allowing yourself to see something, [...] to growing in terms, but it was right in front of you".

The Line of Best Fit wrote "the album’s excellent first promotional single “Paris" brings in bells and synths as she sings of returning to an old muse after exploring a new city". Mike Neid for Idolator said ""Paris." An ode to the city of love" [...] "However, instead of shacking up with a sexy Parisian, the rising star is bombarded with memories of her Los Angeles lover."

== Promotion ==
A music video for the song was released through Vevo and YouTube on December 21, 2018, the same day Carpenter annouced her third headlining concert tour, the Singular Tour. Carpenter teased photos from music video coming up to its release date. It was directed by Jasper Cable-Alexander and shows clips of Carpenter in a hotel room and on the streets of Paris.

Carpenter included the song on the setlist for her Singular Tour in 2018. She has stated that the tour and setlist was put together in 'one week'. Carpenter performed the song live on Good Morning America on July 5, 2019, just before the release of her fourth studio album Singular: Act II (2019) and included "Paris" on the set. On July 31, 2022, Carpenter asked fans via Instagram what songs they would like to hear her performing on her then upcoming fourth headlining concert tour, the Emails I Can't Send Tour. Ultimately "Paris" was included on the setlist for the duration of the tour. During Carpenter's Short n' Sweet Tour, Carpenter performed "Paris" as the surprise song for the night at her show in Paris. It was the first time the song had been performed since the end of the Emails I Can't Send tour.

== Credits and personnel ==
Recording and management

- Recorded at Chumba Meadows (Tarzana, California)
- Mixed at Hercules St. Studios (Sydney)
- Mastered at Sterling Sound (New York City)
- BMG Platinum Songs/Bad Robot Music (BMI) (all rights administered by BMG Rights Management (US) LLC), EMI April Music Inc/Bob Ochoa's Homemade Salsa (ASCAP), Seven Summits Music (BMI) obo Itself and Pink Mic Music (BMI)

Personnel

- Sabrina Carpenter – vocals, songwriting
- Brett McLaughlin – songwriting, vocal production, engineering
- Jason Evigan – songwriting, production, vocal production, all instruments, programming
- Gian Stone – vocal production, engineering
- Eric J. Dubowsky – mixing
- Tim Watt – mix assistant
- Chris Gehringer – mastering

Credits adapted from Singular: Act I liner notes.

== Release history ==
Release history and formats for "Paris"
Region	Date	Format(s)	Label	Ref.
Various	October 25, 2018	Digital download; streaming	Hollywood	
