= Almost Love =

Almost Love may refer to:

- Almost Love (2006 film), a South Korean film
- Almost Love (2019 film), an American comedy drama romance film
- Almost Love (song), a 2018 song by Sabrina Carpenter
