= Singular: Act I =

Studio album by Sabrina Carpenter
- Released: November 9, 2018
- Recorded: 2017–2018
- Genre: Dance-pop
- Length: 25:01
- Label: Hollywood
- Producers: Johan Carlsson; Jason Evigan; Oak Felder; German; Brett McLaughlin; Rob Persaud; Mike Sabath; Stargate; The Monsters & Strangerz

Sabrina Carpenter chronology
Evolution (2016)	Singular: Act I (2018)	Singular: Act II (2019)

Singles from Singular: Act I
- 1. "Almost Love" Released: June 6, 2018; 2. "Sue Me" Released: November 9, 2018

Singular: Act I is the third studio album by American singer Sabrina Carpenter. It was released on November 9, 2018, through Hollywood Records. Carpenter began work on the album shortly after the release of her second studio album, Evolution (2016). The dance-pop album is themed around self-empowerment and marked the first time where all songs on an album were co-written by Carpenter. In support of the album, Carpenter embarked on the Singular Tour in March 2019.

Two singles were released for the album including "Almost Love" and "Sue Me", while "Paris" and "Bad Time" were released as promotional singles. Additionally, singles "Why" and "Alien" were not on the album's tracklist but were instead included on the Japanese edition of the album. The album received critical acclaim from music critics, and debuted at number 103 on the US Billboard 200. The album itself is the first half of a two-piece project, being supplemented by Singular: Act II (2019).

== Background and release ==
Carpenter released her second studio album Evolution in 2016 to commercial success and began to work soon after on her follow up album, originally titled Singular. During The De-Tour in 2017, she began teasing material from the album including a now scrapped song titled "Alone Together" and "Why"; the latter was not included in the final tracklisting. In March 2018, Carpenter also released "Alien" with British DJ Jonas Blue which reached number one on the US Dance Club Songs chart.

In May 2018, Carpenter began teasing Singular with the release of the lead single, "Almost Love". In June, Carpenter released a trailer for the album, which was scheduled for a winter 2018 release. The trailer was directed by Lauren Dunn with snippets from songs including "Sue Me", "Mona Lisa" and "I Can't Stop Me". She premiered "Almost Love" that same week alongside a live performance at Wango Tango.

In October, during a performance of "Almost Love" on The Late Late Show with James Corden, Carpenter ripped off a piece of the set wall revealing a part of the album cover art and spray painted "11/9" on the wall indicating that the album was scheduled for release on November 9, 2018. That same month she also announced that the album would be split into two parts with Act I officially released on November 9, 2018. A compact disc was exclusively released for sale at Target stores.

During the day of release, Carpenter stated her reasoning for separating the releases, stating "i feel with the way music is digested nowadays i wanted you to be able to really hear each song. So technically by splitting it into 2 albums I'm able to give you more songs whereas if i just did one album i think a few would have had to go[sic].".

== Composition ==
=== Genres and themes ===
Singular: Act I is primarily a dance-pop album. Its lyrical content centred around empowerment with PopCrush writer Erica Russel calling it an introduction to Carpenter's "playful psyche". The album cover portrayed Carpenter on a staircase "amidst the chaos" where "you feel like you really are the only one who exists in the crowd".

=== Music and content ===
The album opens with "Almost Love", which Mike Nied of Idolator described as an "edgy anthem". The song is about a relationship ready to take the next step and contains "intermittent whistles and drums". Affinity writer Lucy Parry called it a "great start to the album" noting that the "bridge is possibly the best part of this track as they strip away the bass-line". This is followed by "Paris" which was called an "ode to the city of love". Carpenter sings about being reminded that she "already [has] love in LA". Parry noted that the song might sound like a cliché but rather works as the opposite, with Carpenter using her head voice over "a gorgeous guitar riff". "Hold Tight" was described as "stellar slow jam" and features Amir Mitchell-Townes as Uhmeer, one of Carpenter's castmates from Girl Meets World. The song was also described a "slinky and vaguely retro R&B" song with subtle sexual references indicating that "Carpenter is now an adult".

"Sue Me" was written by Carpenter after she had been sued by her ex music managers Stan Rogow and Elliot Lurie for allegedly not paying them commissions after she fired them in 2014. In an interview with Live With Kelly & Ryan, Carpenter noted that the song is about "empowerment", "confidence: and "being comfortable with yourself regardless of what anybody thinks". Nied called the song a "self-assured tune for the end of a relationship" adding that it is a "sassy kiss-off". This is followed by "Prfct" which was titled incorrectly to reflect imperfection. The song talks about not needing everything in a relationship to be perfect for it to work and features "fuzzy gramophone effects" before and after the song.

"Bad Time" is a "synth-driven [...] badass anthem" which adds to the empowerment theme of the album. The song sees Carpenter "picking and choosing when they want to engage with someone". "Mona Lisa" named after the famous painting of the same name was described as "enticing" and contained "flirty and creative lines". Carpenter sings about not wanting to be left "hanging like the Mona Lisa". The album closes with "Diamonds Are Forever", ending "the album in the most empowering way possible". Carpenter was described as a "soaring diva" and sings about knowing her self-worth never selling yourself short. The Line of Best Fit called the song a "theatrical belter" and compared it to Ariana Grande's song, "Dangerous Woman".

The singles "Why" and "Alien" were included on the Japanese edition of the album alongside several remixes.

== Critical reception ==
Professional ratings
Review scores
Source	Rating
Afinitty	8.8/10
AllMusic	3.5/5 stars
Earmilk	4.5/5 stars
The Line of Best Fit	7.5/10

Upon release, Singular: Act I received critical acclaim. Mike Nied of Idolator wrote in his review that the album is an "eight-track collection jam-packed with bop after bop". He called the album "lush with potential hits" and "another near-perfect work from one of the industry's brightest young stars." He added that with the album Carpenter had "truly earned her status as one of pop's most consistent acts".

The Line of Best Fit writer Julian Baldsing rated the album 7.5 out of 10, stating that "it's certainly no small triumph that Singular: Act I stands so firmly by itself and its creation marks an exciting new phase of an artist properly coming into her own." He added that "Carpenter has always displayed a knack for crafting and curating strong pop releases" and that the album "sees her hone these skills further, resulting in her tightest, most polished project to date".

Lucy Parry from Affinity called the album "a pop masterpiece" and its production "exquisite" also praising the use of more mature themes compared to her previous works. Earmilk writer Larisha Paul gave the album 9 stars noting that Carpenter showed her "versatility on a myriad of sonic landscapes". She gave Carpenter's vocals the biggest praise adding that "her inarguable dynamic vocal performances that remain consistent in every track is what sets her apart from the rest." She added that the album "conveys the singer in a space equipped for showcasing her talent and attraction as a pop artist" noting that it "shows immense promise for the future of her discography as she continues to cement her place as one of the top new artist in this next generation of musicians".

== Promotion ==
"Almost Love" was released as the album's lead single on June 6, 2018 alongside Carpenter's official announcement of the album which came out a week earlier. The song topped the Dance Club Songs chart making it Carpenter's second song to do so. The song also reached 21 on the US Mainstream Top 40 chart. A music video was also released through Vevo and YouTube on July 13, 2018. She promoted the song with live performances at Wango Tango, Good Morning America and The Late Late Show with James Corden. "Sue Me" was released as the album's second single on January 8, 2019. It received a music video on November 16, 2018. Carpenter promoted the single with live performances on The Today Show and Live with Kelly and Ryan. The song also reached number one on the Dance Club Songs chart making it Carpenter's third number one on the chart.

"Paris" and "Bad Time" were released as promotional singles on October 25, 2018 and November 2, 2018 respectively. A music video directed by Jasper Cable-Alexander was released for the former and filmed in Paris, France. A visualiser was released for "Bad Time". In March 2019, Carpenter embarked on the Singular Tour. The tour began in Orlando, Florida on March 2, 2019.

== Commercial performance ==
Singular Act I debuted at number 103 on the US Billboard 200 and 38 on the US Top Album Sales chart. The singles from the album fared well on the charts with "Almost Love" and "Sue Me" both reaching number one on the US Dance Club Songs chart and 21 and 31, respectively, on the US Pop Songs chart.

== Track listing ==
Singular: Act I track listing
No.	Title	Writer(s)	Producer(s)	Length
1.	"Almost Love"	Sabrina Carpenter; Steph Jones; Nate Campany; Mikkel Eriksen	Stargate; Tim Blacksmith^{[a]}; Danny D^{[a]}	3:32
2.	"Paris"	Carpenter; Brett McLaughlin; Jason Evigan	Evigan^{[b]}; McLaughlin^{[c]}; Gian Stone^{[c]}	3:38
3.	"Hold Tight" (featuring Uhmeer)	Carpenter; Mike Sabath; McLaughlin	Sabath	2:55
4.	"Sue Me"	Carpenter; Warren "Oak" Felder; Jones; Trevor Brown; William Zaire Simmons	Felder; Brown^{[d]}; Zaire Koalo^{[d]}	2:59
5.	"Prfct"	Carpenter; Rob Persaud; Jenna Andrews	Persaud	2:46
6.	"Bad Time"	Oscar Görres; Carpenter; Julia Karlsson	Görres^{[b]}	3:04
7.	"Mona Lisa"	James Abrahart; Carpenter; Campany; Jordan Johnson; Stefan Johnson; Marcus Lomax; Oliver Peterhof	German; The Monsters & Strangerz	2:18
8.	"Diamonds Are Forever"	Johan Carlsson; Ross Golan; Dallas Davidson; Carpenter	Carlsson^{[b]}	3:49
Total length:				25:01

Japanese CD edition bonus tracks
No.	Title	Writer(s)	Producer(s)	Length
9.	"Alien" (with Jonas Blue)	Carpenter; Janee Bennett; Jonas Blue	Jonas Blue	2:55
10.	"Almost Love" (Stargate warehouse mix)	Carpenter; Jones; Campany; Eriksen	Stargate^{[e]}	3:20
11.	"Sue Me" (KC Lights remix)	Carpenter; Felder; Jones; Brown; Simmons	Felder; Brown^{[d]}; Koalo^{[d]}; KC Lights^{[f]}	3:22
12.	"Alien" (with Jonas Blue – M-22 remix)	Carpenter; Bennett; Blue	Jonas Blue; M-22^{[f]}	3:25
13.	"Why"	Carpenter; Jonas Jeberg; McLaughlin	Jeberg	2:51
Total length:				39:55

Notes

- ^{^a}signifies an executive producer
- ^{^b}signifies an also vocal producer
- ^{^c}signifies a vocal producer
- ^{^d}signifies a co-producer
- ^{^e}signifies an also remixer
- ^{^f}signifies a remixer

== Credits and personnel ==
Credits adapted from the liner notes of Singular: Act I.

Recorded, engineered, mixed and mastered at

- Venice, California (The Stellar House)
- Tarzana, California (Chumba Medows)
- West Hollywood, California (Studio Nation)
- Los Angeles, California (SuCasa Recording, Roxstone Studios, M&S Studios, Sonic Element Studio)
- Stockholm, Sweden (Wolf Cousins Studios)
- Burbank, California (Resonate Studios)
- Nashville, Tennessee (Sienna Studios)
- Sydney (Hercules St. Studio)
- Virginia Beach, Virginia (MixStar Studios)
- New York City (Sterling Sound)

Vocals

- "Downtown" Trevor Brown – backing vocals (4)
- Johan Carlsson – backing vocals (8)
- Sabrina Carpenter – vocals (all tracks), backing vocals (6, 8)
- Warren "Oak" Felder – backing vocals (4)
- Ross Golan – backing vocals (8)
- Oscar Görres – backing vocals (6)
- Julia Karlsson – backing vocals (6)
- Zaire Koalo – backing vocals (4)
- Rob Persaud – backing vocals (5)
- Uhmeer – vocals (3)

Production

- Tim Blacksmith – executive production (1)
- "Downtown" Trevor Brown – co-production (4)
- Johan Carlsson – production, vocal production (8)
- Danny D – executive production (1)
- Jason Evigan – production, vocal production (2)
- Warren "Oak" Felder – production (4)
- Greg "G GOLT" Golterman – production coordination (7)
- Oscar Görres – production, vocal production (6)
- Christian "GJ" Johnson – production coordination (7)
- Zaire Koalo – co-production (4)
- Jeremy "JBOOGS" Levin – production coordination (7)
- Brett McLaughlin – vocal production (2)
- The Monsters & Strangerz – production (7)
- Rob Persaud – production (5)
- Oliver "German" Peterhof – production (7)
- Mike Sabath – production (3)
- David "DSLIB" Silberstein – production coordination (7)
- Stargate – production (1)
- Gian Stone – vocal production (2)

Instrumentation

- Nils-Petter Ankarblom – synthesizer strings (8)
- David Bukovinszky – cello (8)
- Mattias Bylund – synthesizer pad, strings (8)
- Johan Carlsson – piano, guitar, synthesizer, tambourine (8)
- Jason Evigan – instrumentation (2)
- Oscar Görres – keyboard, bass, guitar, drums, percussion (6)
- Mattias Johansson – violin (8)
- The Monsters & Strangerz – instrumentation (7)
- Oliver "German" Peterhof – instrumentation (7)
- Mikkel S. Eriksen – instrumentation, (1)

Design

- Amber Park – creative direction, design
- Stijn van Hapert – design
- Elsa Henneke – design
- Amanda Charchian – photography

Technical

- Nils-Petter Ankarblom – string arrangement (8)
- William Binderup – mix assistant (3)
- Tim Brennan – assistant engineering (8)
- John Bruington – assistant engineering (8)
- Johan Carlsson – programming, engineering (8)
- Eric J Dubowsky – mixing (1–2, 4)
- Mikkel S. Eriksen – recording, programming, (1)
- Jason Evigan – programming (2)
- Warren "Oak" Felder – engineering, programming, (4)
- Chris Gehringer – mastering (all tracks)
- Serban Ghenea – mixing (6–8)
- Oscar Görres – programming (6)
- John Hanes – engineering (6–8)
- Stefan Johnson – engineering (7)
- Thomas Kang – assistant engineering (8)
- Zaire Koalo – drum programming (4)
- Erik Madrid – mixing (3)
- The Monsters & Strangerz – programming (7)
- Rob Persaud – engineering, mixing (5)
- Oliver "German" Peterhof – programming (7)
- Keith "DaQuan" Sorrells – assistant engineering (4)
- Gian Stone – engineering (2)
- Thomas Warren – recording (1)
- Tim Watt – mix assistant (1–2, 4)

== Charts ==
Chart performance for Singular: Act I
Chart (2018)	Peak position
Australian Digital Albums (ARIA)	20
Dutch Albums (MegaCharts)	198
France Downloads Albums (SNEP)	84
Japanese Albums (Oricon)	183
UK Download Albums (OCC)	48
UK Sales Albums (OCC)	98
US Billboard 200	103

== Release history ==
Release history and formats for Singular: Act I
Region	Date	Format	Label	Ref.
Various	November 9, 2018	Digital download	Hollywood	
United States	November 9, 2018	CD	Hollywood	
United Kingdom	November 9, 2018	CD	Polydor	
Japan	December 12, 2018	CD	Universal	
Various	October 18, 2019	LP	Universal	
Various	September 9, 2024	LP	Hollywood	
