= Sue Me (Sabrina Carpenter song) =

Single by Sabrina Carpenter

from the album Singular: Act I
- Released: November 9, 2018
- Recorded: September 2017
- Studio: SuCasa Recording (Los Angeles, California)
- Genre: Pop; EDM; Electropop
- Length: 2:59
- Label: Hollywood
- Songwriters: Sabrina Carpenter; Warren "Oak" Felder; Steph Jones; "Downtown" Trevor Brown; William Zaire Simmons
- Producer: Oak Felder

Sabrina Carpenter singles chronology
"Paris" (2018)	"Sue Me" (2018)	"Pushing 20" (2019)

Music video
- "Sue Me" on YouTube

"Sue Me" is a song recorded by American singer Sabrina Carpenter from her third studio album Singular: Act I (2018), serving as the fourth track of the album. The track was written by Sabrina Carpenter and Steph Jones and was produced by Warren "Oak" Felder with its co-producers, Trevor Brown, William Zaire Simmons. The song was released by Hollywood Records as the third single from Singular: Act I on November 9, 2018, and was released to contemporary hit radio on January 8, 2019. Lyrically, "Sue Me" is about the relief of being out of a bad relationship and challenging someone to stop them for living their best life.

It was accompanied by a music video directed by Lauren Dunn premiered on her Vevo channel on November 16, 2018. The music video features Carpenter's friend and actress Joey King and Sergio D'arcy Lane and it was shot at Pepperdine University. Carpenter promoted "Sue Me" with several live performances in the release day, on The Today Show and on Live with Kelly and Ryan.

== Background and recording ==
Carpenter wrote the song after she was sued by her ex music managers Stan Rogow and Elliot Lurie for allegedly not paying them commissions after she fired them in August 2014. They claimed that they should have some of the revenue from Carpenter's previous two albums Evolution and Eyes Wide Open. Carpenter has confirmed this is the background, but has not commented on the situation. On May 23, 2018, the ruling was filed in favor of Carpenter and allowed recovery of legal costs from Rogow and Lurie.

Carpenter also stated this song as representing pure confidence. Carpenter said that "Sue Me" was the first track that was giving a direction to the album because it was in a different lane than the other songs that she had written before.

The song was written in September 2017, after Carpenter concluded the De Tour, by Sabrina Carpenter, Warren "Oak" Felder, Steph Jones, Trevor Brown and William Zaire Simmons. It was produced by Felder with Brown and Zaire Koalo as co-producers. Felder, Brown and Koalo did the background vocals while Felder programmed the track and Koalo handled the drum programming. Felder engineered the track at SuCasa Recording in Los Angeles with Keith "Daquan" Sorrells serving as an assistant engineer. The song was mixed by Eric J Dubowsky at Hercules St. Studios in Sydney and Tim Watt served as a mix assistant. The song was mastered at Sterling Sound in New York City by Chris Gehringer.

== Music video ==
Carpenter first premiered a snippet of the music video on November 9, 2018, on TRL. The music video was released through Vevo and YouTube on November 16, 2018. It was directed by Lauren Dunn and Carpenter's friends Joey King and Sergio D'arcy Lane feature in the music video. The music video was shot in one day at the Pepperdine University in Malibu, California, the same campus that Zoey 101 was shot. According to the video's hair stylist, Scott King's Instagram story, the video was shot on August 17, 2018. It is said that this video is based on Legally Blonde as it has very similar storylines, characters and features, but Carpenter has not yet confirmed if this is the background. On December 14, 2024, the music video was deleted and re-uploaded. Within hours, the re-upload was taken down and the original upload of the video was put back up on December 16, 2024.

== Live performances ==
Carpenter first performed the song on November 9, 2018, on The Today Show and Live with Kelly and Ryan. It was fourteenth to be performed on the Singular Tour. Additionally, she performed the song on Good Morning America's Summer Concert Series.

== Track listing ==
Digital download
No.	Title	Length
1.	"Sue Me"	2:59

Digital EP – remixes
No.	Title	Length
1.	"Sue Me"	2:59
2.	"Sue Me" (KC Lights remix)	3:22
3.	"Sue Me" (6am Remix)	2:54
4.	"Sue Me" (Marian Hill remix)	3:37
5.	"Sue Me" (Dave Audé remix)	3:50

Digital download – a cappella
No.	Title	Length
1.	"Sue Me" (a cappella)	3:22

== Credits and personnel ==
Recording and management

- Recorded at SuCasa Recording (Los Angeles, California)
- Mixed at Hercules St. Studios (Sydney, Australia)
- Mastered at Sterling Sound (New York City)
- Seven Summits Music (BMI) obo Itself and Pink Mic Music (BMI), Sony/ATV Songs LLC/Crew's Tree Publishing (BMI), Vistaville Music (ASCAP) obo Itself, Not That Steph Jones (ASCAP) and Big Deal Hits (ASCAP), Reservoir Media Music obo Itself & The Orphanage LLC/Quest Da Stars (ASCAP), Reservoir Media Music obo Itself & The Orphanage LLC/Downtown Trevor Brown (ASCAP)

Personnel

- Sabrina Carpenter – lead vocals, songwriting
- Warren "Oak" Felder – songwriting, production for GO! Music and The Orphanage, engineering, programming, background vocals
- Steph Jones – songwriting
- "Downtown" Trevor Brown – songwriting, co-production for The Orphanage, background vocals
- Zaire Koalo – songwriting, co-production for The Orphanage, drum programming, background vocals
- Keith "Daquan" Sorrells – assistant engineering
- Eric J. Dubowsky – mixing
- Tim Watt – mix assistant
- Chris Gehringer – mastering

Credits adapted from Singular: Act I liner notes.

== Charts ==
=== Weekly charts ===
Chart (2019)	Peak position
US Dance Club Songs (Billboard)	1
US Pop Airplay (Billboard)	31

=== Year-end charts ===
Chart (2019)	Position
US Dance Club Songs (Billboard)	17

== Certifications ==
Region	Certification	Certified units/sales
Australia (ARIA)	Platinum	70,000^{‡}
Brazil (Pro-Música Brasil)	2× Platinum	80,000^{‡}
New Zealand (RMNZ)	Gold	15,000^{‡}
United Kingdom (BPI)	Silver	200,000^{‡}
United States (RIAA)	Platinum	1,000,000^{‡}
^{‡} Sales+streaming figures based on certification alone.

== Release history ==
Region	Date	Format	Version	Label	Ref.
Various	November 9, 2018	Digital download	Original	Hollywood	
Australia	November 9, 2018	Contemporary hit radio	Original	Hollywood; Universal Music Australia	
United States	January 8, 2019	Contemporary hit radio	Original	Hollywood	
Various	January 18, 2019	Digital download	Remixes	Hollywood	
Italy	January 25, 2019	Contemporary hit radio	Original	Universal	
Various	March 22, 2019	Digital download	A cappella	Hollywood	

== See also ==
- List of Billboard number-one dance songs of 2019
