= Why (Sabrina Carpenter song) =

Single by Sabrina Carpenter
- Released: July 7, 2017
- Recorded: February 2017
- Studio: Big Noize Studios (Hollywood Hills, California)
- Genre: Electropop
- Length: 2:51
- Label: Hollywood
- Songwriters: Jonas Jeberg; Brett McLaughlin; Sabrina Carpenter
- Producer: Jonas Jeberg

Sabrina Carpenter singles chronology
"Hands" (2017)	"Why" (2017)	"First Love" (2017)

Music video
- "Why" on YouTube

"Why" is a song recorded by American singer Sabrina Carpenter from the Japanese deluxe edition of Singular: Act I (2018). The track was written by Carpenter, Brett McLaughlin, and its producer Jonas Jeberg. The song was released on July 7, 2017, through Hollywood Records. "Why" has been described as an electropop song backed by a hypnotic synthesizer loop and a finger-click beat and slick beat at the chorus. According to Carpenter, the lyrics talks about her and a guy being completely opposite, but they're made for each other. The song became Carpenter's second to enter the Billboard Bubbling Under Hot 100 peaking at number twenty-one and was certified gold in the United States (RIAA).

It was accompanied by a music video directed by Jay Martin and filmed in New York City. It was released on Vevo channel on July 19, 2017. The music video begins with Carpenter and her love interest, Casey Cott, having a conversation where both don't have the same likes in movies. Carpenter promoted "Why" with several televised performances, including on The Tonight Show Starring Jimmy Fallon and Live with Kelly and Ryan.

== Background and recording ==
Carpenter teased the single release by sending postcards with handwritten notes and pieces of the artwork to fans. She also posted stills from romance movies on social media.

She told Billboard magazine that the song "happened very quickly". "We started with the first line of the song – 'You like New York City in the daytime; I like New York City in the night time' – and from there, the song kind of wrote itself. It's basically [about] these differences that we all have, that keep us different from one another but at the same time glue us together... I like to say it's very conversational, which some of my other songs haven't been before." She said that she "wanted this song to be able to take [fans] through the summer".

"'Why' is a question we seem to pose daily, so there are multiple meanings within the song that are up to interpretation. We don’t necessarily need to be the same, to love the same. Sometimes differences can hold us together and I think that’s a beautiful sentiment to how we deal with divergence and how it can furthermore prove our compatibility. In the end, we don’t really need to know 'why' if we are confident in our own emotions," Carpenter told iHeartRadio.

In an interview with Music Choice, Carpenter said that she is very excited about the song, and that she wrote it "a few months back". She said that once "we found that line [the first line of the song] we started going off on finding these little things that make us different from each other but they're not deal breakers".

The song was written and recorded in March 2017 at Big Noize Studios (Hollywood Hills, California) by Carpenter, Brett McLaughlin and Jonas Jeberg. Jeberg produced, recorded and played all the instruments for the track. The song was mixed by Serban Ghenea at MixStar Studios in Virginia Beach, Virginia and John Hanes served as a mix assistant. The song was mastered at Sterling Sound in New York City by Chris Gehringer.

== Composition ==
"Why"
A 30-second sample of the chorus of "Why", an electropop and dark pop song.

"Why" is a two minutes and fifty-one seconds electropop song. According to the sheet music published at Musicnotes.com the song is composed in the time signature of common time with a moderate rate of 90 beats per minute. It is written in the key of B minor and follows the chord progression of G2-Em7-Bm7-A. Sabrina's vocal range spans from the low note A3 to the high note of B4, giving the song almost one octave of range. The tempo is relaxed. Originally, the bridge was a second part of the second verse.

== Music video ==
=== Background and release ===
On July 16, 2017, Carpenter released a teaser of the music video on social media, which shows American actor Casey Cott and herself in a city, with Carpenter holding a camera. The video's release date was revealed in the caption. On July 19, 2017, she posted a compilation of the music video which shows her at a restaurant and in the streets of a city. In the same day, the video was premiered on Vevo and YouTube and the behind the scenes of the music video was premiered on September 9, 2017, in Sabrina's personal account. The music video was shot on June 20, 2017 in New York City by Jay Martin and explores the theme of opposites attracting, showing Carpenter and Cott maintaining their relationship despite being polar opposites. On July 21, 2017, Carpenter revealed on Twitter that the video was inspired by "many films" so it was shot "very cinematically".

=== Synopsis ===
Sabrina Carpenter and her love interest (Casey Cott) laying on a bed

The music video starts with a scene where Carpenter and Cott are contemplating a graffiti with the word "Why" in the wall. Carpenter takes a picture of it. Then, Carpenter and Cott go to a dessert spot, and in their conversation, they realize that they were different. Carpenter asked him to leave. Cott picked up the salt and pepper and said "this is you [the salt] and this is me [the pepper], at first glance it might not look like we go together but everybody knows that we belong together."

The during the music video, shows Carpenter and Cott in an apartment in New York City. In the apartment they do various things, like eat Chinese food, lay together on the bed and kiss. During that, the music video has shots of Carpenter taking photos in the streets. The music video ends with Carpenter leaving the dessert spot and, when she is outside, she looks back.

=== Critical reception ===
Deepa Lakshmin of MTV called the video "a cheesy but cute introduction" to the song, while Mike Wass of Idolator called it "a suitably whimsical accompaniment to the song".

== Critical reception ==
Jason Lipshutz of Billboard magazine wrote that the single is "both extremely likable and highly promising of what's to come from the 18-year-old" and "the first step in an inevitable crossover", and that it "finds Carpenter playing a game of opposites attract with her beau, and sounding steadier in her vocal delivery". He felt that the "chopped-up synths" evoke Zedd and Alessia Cara's song "Stay". Katrina Rees of CelebMix thinks that the song "experiments with an electro-pop sound", and that Carpenter's "distinctive" vocal "glides effortlessly over the slick beat". Ilana Kaplan of New York Observer called the song a "pure dark-pop bop" and "hypnotic", and that it shows "Carpenter is more than ready to be taken seriously" and "a new side of the 18-year-old star". Brandon Yu of SFGate regarded the song as "a catchy electro-pop tune", and that it "sounds like a surefire summer radio staple". Mike Wass of Idolator referred the song as "one of the year's catchiest pop songs in early July", and felt that the "very on-trend" drop evokes Kiiara's debut single "Gold" and Kygo and Selena Gomez's collaboration "It Ain't Me".

== Live performances ==
The song was premiered on the first show of The De-Tour being the sixteenth song to be performed. On August 21, 2017, Carpenter performed the song on Live with Kelly and Ryan. On October 24, 2017, Carpenter performed the song on The Tonight Show Starring Jimmy Fallon. Carpenter performed the song in various shows on Jingle Ball 2017 along with Thumbs, First Love and Have Yourself a Merry Little Christmas. The song was tenth to be performed on the Singular Tour. She also performed the song on Good Morning America's Summer Concert Series.

== Accolades ==
Awards and nominations
Organization	Year	Category	Result	Ref.
Radio Disney Music Awards	2018	"XOXO – Best Crush Song"	Nominated	

== Track listing ==
Digital download

1. Why – 2:51

Digital download – acoustic version

1. Why (acoustic) – 3:04

== Credits and personnel ==
Recording and management

- Recorded at Big Noize Studios (Hollywood Hills, California)
- Mixed at MixStar Studios (Virginia Beach, Virginia)
- Mastered at Sterling Sound (New York City)
- Seven Summits Music (BMI) obo Itself and Pink Mic Music (BMI), BMG Platinum Songs (BMI) obo BMG Rights Management UK Ltd (all rights administered by BMG Rights Management (US) LLC), EMI April Music Inc/Bob Ochoa's Homemade Salsa (ASCAP)

Personnel

- Sabrina Carpenter – lead vocals, songwriting
- Jonas Jeberg – songwriting, production for Big Noize Productions LLC, recording, all instrumentation
- Brett McLaughlin – songwriting
- Serban Ghenea – mixing
- John Hanes – mix assistant
- Chris Gehringer – mastering

Credits adapted from Singular: Act I (Japanese edition) liner notes.

== Charts ==
Chart performance
Chart (2017)	Peak position
Czech Republic Singles Digital (ČNS IFPI)	92
New Zealand Heatseekers (RMNZ)	8
Slovakia Singles Digital (ČNS IFPI)	85
US Bubbling Under Hot 100 (Billboard)	21
US Pop Airplay (Billboard)	27

== Certifications ==
Certifications
Region	Certification	Certified units/sales
Australia (ARIA)	Platinum	70,000^{‡}
Brazil (Pro-Música Brasil)	Gold	30,000^{‡}
United States (RIAA)	Gold	500,000^{‡}
^{‡} Sales+streaming figures based on certification alone.

== Release history ==
Release history
Country	Date	Format
Worldwide	July 7, 2017	Digital download
