= First Love (Lost Kings song) =

2017 song by Lost Kings

Single by Lost Kings featuring Sabrina Carpenter

from the album We Are Lost Kings (Japan EP)
- Released: October 13, 2017
- Genre: Dance-pop; synth-pop
- Length: 3:27
- Label: Disruptor; RCA
- Songwriters: Albin Nedler; Brittany Amaradio; Kristoffer Fogelmark; Norris Shanholtz; Rami Yacoub; Robert Abisi
- Producer: Lost Kings

Lost Kings singles chronology
"Look at Us Now" (2017)	"First Love" (2017)	"Don't Call" (2017)

Sabrina Carpenter singles chronology
"Why" (2017)	"First Love" (2017)	"Alien" (2018)

Music video
- "First Love" on YouTube

"First Love" is a song by American DJ duo Lost Kings featuring vocals from American singer Sabrina Carpenter, released as a single on October 13, 2017, by Disruptor and RCA records. The track was written by Albin Nedler, Brittany Amaradio, Kristoffer Fogelmark, Noris Shanholz, Rami Yacoub and Robert Abisi with Lost Kings handling the production.

== Composition ==
Musically, "First Love" is a dance and synth-pop song. Lost Kings described it that it is meant to make the listener "feel all of the feels".

== Music video ==
The Tyler Bailey directed music accompanied the song's release and was filmed in New York City.

== Live performances ==
Carpenter performed the song in various shows on Jingle Ball 2017 along with Thumbs, Why and Have Yourself a Merry Little Christmas. She also performed the song on Honda Stage at The Hammerstein Ballroom.

== Track listing ==
Digital download
No.	Title	Length
1.	"First Love" (featuring Sabrina Carpenter)	3:27

Digital EP – Remixes
No.	Title	Length
1.	"First Love" (featuring Sabrina Carpenter) (Ashworth Remix)	3:10
2.	"First Love" (featuring Sabrina Carpenter) (TELYKast Remix)	3:32
3.	"First Love" (featuring Sabrina Carpenter) (SAVI Remix)	3:25
Total length:		10:07

== Personnel ==
Credits adapted from Tidal.

- Lost Kings – production
- Sabrina Carpenter – vocals, featured artist
- Albin Nedler – lyricist, composition
- Brittany Amaradio – lyricist, composition
- Kristoffer Fogelmark – lyricist, composition
- Noris Shanholz – lyricist, composition, recording
- Rami Yacoub – lyricist, composition
- Robert Abisi – lyricist, composition
- Dave Kutch – mastering
- Mitch McCarthy – mixing

== Charts ==
=== Weekly charts ===
Chart (2017)	Peak position
US Hot Dance/Electronic Songs (Billboard)	26
US Bubbling Under Mainstream Top 40 (Billboard)	3

=== Year-end charts ===
Chart (2018)	Position
US Hot Dance/Electronic Songs (Billboard)	81

== Release history ==
Region	Date	Format	Version	Label	Ref.
Various	October 13, 2017	Digital download	Original	Disruptor; RCA	
United States	October 31, 2017	Dance radio	Original	Disruptor; RCA	
Various	December 1, 2017	Digital download	Remixes	Disruptor; RCA	
