= Singular: Act II =

2019 studio album by Sabrina Carpenter

Studio album by Sabrina Carpenter
- Released: July 19, 2019
- Recorded: 2017–2019
- Genres: Pop; R&B; dance
- Length: 28:47
- Label: Hollywood
- Producers: Dayyon Alexander; Trevor Brown; Johan Carlsson; Warren "Oak" Felder; Jonas Jeberg; Mauricio Rengifo; Mike Sabath; Sidney Swift; Stargate; Andrés Torres

Sabrina Carpenter chronology
Singular: Act I (2018)	Singular: Act II (2019)	Emails I Can't Send (2022)

Singular: Act II is the fourth studio album by American singer Sabrina Carpenter, released on July 19, 2019, by Hollywood Records. The album acts as a sequel to her third studio album Singular: Act I (2018) and was her last official release with Hollywood. Recorded and written from 2017 to 2019, Carpenter originally intended to release a full album entitled Singular but ultimately split up the album due to differences in lyrical content. The album spans pop, R&B and dance genres, featuring personal topics including anxiety and self-reflection.

Four promotional singles for the album were released including "Pushing 20", "Exhale", "In My Bed," and "I'm Fakin". The album features a guest appearance from American rapper Saweetie. The album received generally positive reviews from music critics, and debuted at number 138 on the US Billboard 200.

== Background and release ==
In June 2018, Carpenter revealed that her third studio album Singular was completed and that it was scheduled for a winter 2018 release. However, in October, she announced on Twitter that the album would be split into two acts with the first act, Singular: Act I, released on November 9, 2018. After the release of Act I, Carpenter revealed that Act II would be released in early 2019. On the split, Carpenter noted that,

I describe Act II as Act I upside down where Act I makes you feel comfortable with yourself and Act II makes you feel a little uncomfortable with yourself, in the way that we need to grow. It's also a more vulnerable side of confidence. There is also confidence in being vulnerable and there is also strength in that weaker side of yourself and just kind of letting your emotions run loose.

Carpenter began teasing Act II in December 2018, noting that she planned to tour for the album. In May 2019, Nylon magazine reported that Carpenter had scheduled July 26, 2019, as the release date for Singular: Act II. On June 4, 2019, Carpenter revealed the album artwork by sending it to her fans in multiple cities around the United States using Apple's AirDrop feature. Later that day, Carpenter formally announced the album via her social media and that the release date had been pushed up to July 19, 2019.

== Composition ==
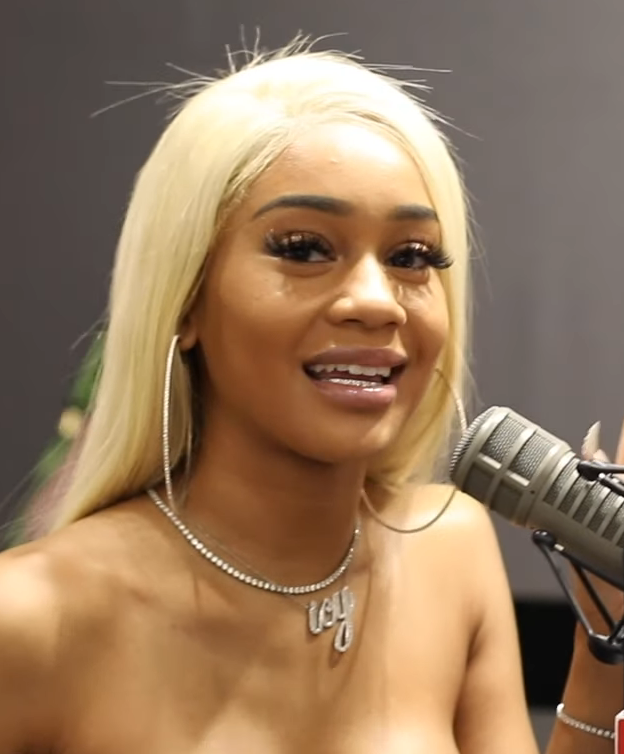
Saweetie (pictured) provides guest vocals on the album.

=== Genres and themes ===
Hope you enjoyed your brief intermission [...] For this second act and closing chapter of the show I ask you to listen intently, and remember in life, there are 2 sides to every story. This is my side. With each number, I hope you find your own stories within them.

— Carpenter's note adapted from album's booklet.

The album is primarily a pop, R&B and dance record. It differed to its predecessor album with its heavier lyrical content, in which Carpenter discusses confidence, anxiety, introspection and self-discovery. Refinery29 writer Kathleen Newman-Bremang noted that the album "sways between boastful, playful pop, and soulful confessions about anxiety". She felt the album was reminiscent of '90s R&B noting her "polished and self-assured" attitude.

On the album's artwork, Carpenter noted that she wanted Act II to be a "broken-down, less straightforward version" of Act I. She called the album her most "personal album yet" in an interview with Marie Claire. The album cover is dark and pictures Carpenter in shadows on a fire escape. Carpenter noted, "to me those represented the flaws and the negativity that we let into our lives".

=== Music and content ===
The album begins with "In My Bed", an "electro-kissed" and synth-laden song which was called one of her "most eclectic efforts to date". Carpenter noted that the song represents the feeling of overthinking and how life feels when you are overwhelmed by anxiety and other "moments where life feels like a lot to deal". Carpenter described it as "opening the door" to Singular: Act II. This is followed by the album's lead single, "Pushing 20", which was written by Carpenter for her 20th birthday in May 2019 and gained comparisons to works by Rihanna and Alessia Cara. The song was described as a pop song with trap and hip-hop elements, and is a "declaration of reclaimed time". The song also talks about being "older, wiser, and less willing to put up with other people's BS".

"I Can't Stop Me", featuring America rapper Saweetie, is a trap beat song which mixes pop with hip-hop. On the song, Carpenter noted that " it feels like what Singular should feel like". She called the song "experimental" adding that "vocally and lyrically, I’m at a time in my life where there are no limits or rules". This is followed by "I'm Fakin", which has tropical house and pop elements and is about the dissonance "of wanting distance and also making up" in a relationship. Paper writer Brendan Wetmore felt that the song demonstrated Carpenter's "melodic prowess and pushes it to a beastly boundary".

"Take Off All Your Cool" is a "laid back song" which contains pop and electropop vibes. Carpenter described the song as "cheeky" while Affinity writer Tatiana Brown noted that the song looks at "the awkwardness of a relationship". This is followed by "Tell Em", which is a synth-pop song with R&B elements. Carpenter's vocals received comparisons to Ariana Grande while she sings about not owing anyone an explanation for what one does. "Exhale", which Carpenter describes as her "most personal song yet" is a pop and R&B ballad about anxiety "and not from some over-generalized, sugar-coated stance". Affinity writer Tatiana Brown noted that the song is meant to "remind people to take a break from pressure and to just breathe".

"Take You Back" is an electropop and bubblegum pop song in which Carpenter wishes she did not waste time with an ex-boyfriend. The song is a buyer's remorse metaphor in which Carpenter sings "If you don’t make me happy / Then what good are you for?" L'Officiel writer Dylan Kelly called the song an anthem "about realizing that you don't actually need someone in your life anymore". The album ends with "Looking At Me", which is a fun, lighthearted, dance-pop and hip hop song influenced by Latin dancehall music. The song talks about owning confidence and being the center of attention and is Carpenter's most streamed release under Hollywood Records.

== Critical reception ==
Professional ratings
Review scores
Source	Rating
Affinity	5/5 stars
AllMusic	3.5/5 stars

Upon release, the album received generally positive reviews. Erica Russel of PopCrush called the album "a glossy, hook-laden collection of danceable pop and R&B" as well as saying the record shows Carpenter's "intimate perspectives, emotions and internal musings about everything from love to growing up". Dylan Kelly of L'Officiel noted that "each song focuses on a different issue that you will probably face at one point in you life with varied rhythms and beats that allow for different emotions to consume you as you make your way through the album." He added that "Carpenter sings from her heart with an elevated maturity and honest vulnerability that makes this set very different to her last".

Brendan Wetmore of Paper also noted that the album is "a culmination of pop eras — a rich plurality that separates itself from anything modern hit-writing has tried to glue together in recent years" and that it is a "truly great standalone pop record". In her review of the album, Kristine Kowalski of YSBNow felt that "Act II is a satisfying follow-up to the first album instalment, filled with empowering jams and emotional moments that take the whole listening experience to the next level" adding that "while we aren't left on a musical cliffhanger, it's clear that the curtain isn't falling with this thrilling release". Tatiana Brown of Affinity called the album a "cohesive collection" and "arguably one of the best albums of the year".

== Promotion ==
While not officially touring for Act II, Carpenter embarked on the Singular Tour in March 2019 for Act I and performed "Pushing 20" and "Exhale" prior to the album's release. Despite minimal performances after the album's release, Carpenter performed various songs from the album at the Summer Sonic Festival in 2019.

=== Singles and music videos ===
"Pushing 20" was released as the album's first promotional single on March 8, 2019. The song was released ahead of Carpenter's 20th birthday and was eighth to be performed on the Singular Tour. Larisha Paul of Earmilk commented on the song saying "[Pushing 20] shows Carpenter continuing to tap into production areas previously unexplored within her discography, with its bouncy, bass-heavy production drawing heavily on hip-hop influenced trap elements while holding true to a distinct pop sound".

"Exhale" was released as the album's second promotional single on May 3, 2019. Carpenter described the song as being her most personal song yet and was performed as the encore on the Singular Tour. The song received a music video, directed by Mowgly Lee, released on May 17, 2019.

"In My Bed", was released on June 7, 2019 as the album's third promotional single. She first performed the song as a part of her Good Morning America summer concert series. The music video for the song was released through Marie Claire on June 28, 2019. The video was described as "restless and sometimes downright woozy" with Billboard writer Rania Aniftos noting that "the viewer is transported into a hypnotic world".

"I'm Fakin", became the fourth promotional single, premiering on July 12, 2019.

== Commercial performance ==
Singular Act II debuted at number 138 on the US Billboard 200, and reached number 53 on the United Kingdom's Album Downloads chart. The songs on the album failed to chart on any major lists apart from "Exhale" which reached number 35 on the New Zealand Hot Singles.

== Track listing ==
Singular: Act II track listing
No.	Title	Writer(s)	Producer(s)	Length
1.	"In My Bed"	Sabrina Carpenter; Steph Jones; Mike Sabath	Sabath^{[a]}; Jones^{[b]}	3:09
2.	"Pushing 20"	Carpenter; Warren "Oak" Felder; Paul Guy Shelton II	Felder	2:46
3.	"I Can't Stop Me" (featuring Saweetie)	Carpenter; Brett McLaughlin; Mikkel Eriksen; Saweetie; Gino Borri	Stargate; Tim Blacksmith^{[c]}; Danny D^{[c]}	3:41
4.	"I'm Fakin"	Carpenter; Katie Pearlman; Jackson Morgan; Andrés Torres; Mauricio Rengifo	Torres; Rengifo	2:55
5.	"Take Off All Your Cool"	Felder; Carpenter; Jones; Trevor Brown; Zaire Koalo	Felder; Brown^{[d]}; Koalo^{[d]}	3:03
6.	"Tell Em"	Carpenter; Bianca Atterberry; Sidney Swift; Dayyon Alexander Drinkard	Swift; Drinkard^{[e]}	4:40
7.	"Exhale"	Johan Carlsson; Ross Golan; Carpenter	Carlsson^{[a]}; Noah Passovoy^{[b]}	2:44
8.	"Take You Back"	Jonas Jeberg; McLaughlin; Chloe Angelides; Carpenter	Jeberg	2:48
9.	"Looking at Me"	Carlsson; James Alan Ghaleb; Carpenter	Carlsson^{[a]}	3:01
Total length:				28:47

Japanese CD edition bonus tracks
No.	Title	Writer(s)	Producer(s)	Length
10.	"Sue Me" (Acappella)	Carpenter; Felder; Jones; Trevor Brown; William Zaire Simmons	Felder	3:23
11.	"Alien" (Acoustic; with Jonas Blue)	Carpenter; Janee Bennett; Guy James Robin	Robin	3:24
Total length:				35:34

Notes

- ^{^a}signifies an also vocal producer
- ^{^b}signifies a vocal producer
- ^{^c}signifies an executive producer
- ^{^d}signifies a co-producer
- ^{^e}signifies an additional producer

== Credits and personnel ==
Credits adapted from the liner notes of Singular: Act II.

Recorded, mixed and mastering

- Los Angeles, California (SuCasa Recording, Eagle Pop Studios and MXM Studios)
- Venice, California (The Stellar House)
- Burbank, California (Resonate Studios)
- Defi Studios
- Hollywood Hills, California (Big Noize Studios)
- Studio Borgen
- New York City (Sterling Sound)
- Virginia Beach, Virginia (MixStar Studios)
- Sydney (Hercules Street Studios)

Vocals

- Sabrina Carpenter – vocals (all tracks), backing vocals (7, 9)
- CJ Baran – backing vocals (9)
- Trevor Brown – backing vocals (5)
- Johan Carlsson – backing vocals (7, 9)
- Warren "Oak" Felder – backing vocals (5)
- Ross Golan – backing vocals (7)

Instrumentation

- Nils-Petter Ankarblom – synthesizer (7)
- Trevor Brown – bass, guitar (5)
- David Bukovinszky – cello (7, 9)
- Mattias Bylund – synthesizer (7, 9)
- Gunhild Carling – trumpet (9)
- Johan Carlsson – electric guitar (7), synthesizer, guitar (9)
- Jonas Jeberg – instrumentation (8)
- Mattias Johansson – violin (7, 9)
- Zaire Koalo – drum programming (5)
- Mauricio Rengifo – keyboard, synthesizer (4)
- Andrés Torres – keyboard, synthesizer, electric guitar (4)

Production

- Johan Carlsson – production, vocal production (7, 9)
- Warren "Oak" Felder – production (2, 5)
- Jonas Jeberg – production (8)
- Mike Sabath – production, vocal production (1)
- Stargate – production (3)
- Sidney Swift – production (6)
- Mauricio Rengifo – production (4)
- Andrés Torres – production (4)
- Trevor Brown – co-production (5)
- Zaire Koalo – co-production (5)
- Dayyon Alexander Drinkard – additional production (6)
- Steph Jones – vocal production (1)
- Noah Passovoy – vocal production (7)
- Danny D – executive production (3)
- Tim Blacksmith – executive production (3)

Technical

- Chris Gehringer – mastering (all tracks)
- Eric J. Dubowsky – mixing (2–5)
- Serban Ghenea – mixing (7–9)
- Mike Sabath – mixing (1)
- Sidney Swift – mixing, programming (6)
- CJ Baran – programming (9)
- Johan Carlsson – programming (7, 9)
- Warren "Oak" Felder – programming (5), engineering (2, 5)
- Mikkel Eriksen – programming, recording (3)
- Mauricio Rengifo – programming, arranging (4)
- Andrés Torres – arranging (4)
- Connor L. Barkhouse – engineering (6)
- John Hanes – engineering (7–9)
- Keith Sorrells – assistant engineers (2)

== Charts ==
Chart performance for Singular: Act II
Chart (2019)	Peak position
Australian Digital Albums (ARIA)	13
French Download Albums (SNEP)	55
UK Download Albums (OCC)	53
US Billboard 200	138

== Release history ==
Release history and formats for Singular: Act II
Region	Date	Format	Label	Ref.
Various	July 19, 2019	Digital download; streaming	Hollywood	
United States	July 19, 2019	CD	Hollywood	
Japan	July 19, 2019	CD	Universal	
Various	July 26, 2019	CD	Universal	
Various	October 18, 2019	LP	Hollywood	
Various	September 9, 2024	LP	Hollywood	
