= Exhale (Sabrina Carpenter song) =

Song recorded by American singer Sabrina Carpenter

Promotional single by Sabrina Carpenter

from the album Singular: Act II
- Released: May 3, 2019
- Recorded: 2019
- Genre: R&B
- Length: 2:44
- Label: Hollywood
- Songwriters: Johan Carlsson; Ross Golan; Sabrina Carpenter
- Producer: Johan Carlsson

Music video
- "Exhale" on YouTube

"Exhale" is a song recorded by American singer Sabrina Carpenter from her fourth studio album Singular: Act II (2019), released as the album's second promotional single on May 3, 2019. Before the song's release, Carpenter performed the song as an encore on the Singular Tour.

== Background and release ==
Carpenter stated that "Exhale" is the most difficult song for her to sing as she gets very emotional. Carpenter also described the song as being her most personal and vulnerable song yet. Carpenter began performing the song as an encore of the Singular Tour. After the reception from her fans, Carpenter considered putting the song on Singular: Act II, before finally deciding to include it on the track list.

In April 2019, Carpenter stated that "Exhale" would be released very soon, presumably being released as a single. Carpenter further fuelled the rumours at the 2019 Billboard Music Awards, saying that she would be releasing her "most personal song yet" soon. On May 2, 2019, Carpenter formally announced the single via her social media. The song was released that night.

The song was written in 2019, just before Carpenter embarked on the Singular Tour, by Carpenter, Ross Golan and the song's producer, Johan Carlsson. The vocals were produced by Carlsson and Noah Passovoy. Carlsson played electric guitar, programmed, and served background vocals with Carpenter and Golan to the track. The strings were recorded and edited by Mattias Bylund at Studio Borgen in Partille and arranged by Nils-Petter Ankarblom. The orchestra consists of David Bukovinszky on cello, Mattias Johansson on violin and Bylund and Ankarblom on string synthesizers. The song was mixed by Serban Ghenea at MixStar Studios in Virginia Beach and John Hanes served as an engineer for mix. The song was mastered at Sterling Sound in New York City by Chris Gehringer with Will Quinnell serving as an assistant.

== Composition ==
"Exhale" is a "somber" midtempo R&B ballad that runs for two minutes and forty four seconds. Lyrically, the song is about pressure and anxiety in life and the need to take a breather or break from them.

== Music video ==
A visualizer video accompanied the song's release. It features a digitally edited version of the song's artwork moving around. The song's official music video was premiered on Carpenter's YouTube and VEVO channels on May 17, 2019. It was directed by Mowgly Lee and features Carpenter singing in a valley. At the end of the video, Carpenter's studio vocals turn into a live a cappella of her singing the song. John Blistein of Rolling Stone called the video "simple but affecting". The music video was temporarily re-released on Carpenter's YouTube channel on July 27, 2024, shortly ahead of Carpenter's 2024 album Short n' Sweet.

== Live performances ==
"Exhale" was performed as the encore on the Singular Tour.

== Credits and personnel ==
Recording and management

- Strings Recorded and Edited at Studio Borgen (Partille, Sweden)
- Mixed at MixStar Studios (Virginia Beach, Virginia)
- Mastered at Sterling Sound (New York City)
- MXM (ASCAP) all rights administered by Kobalt Songs Music Publishing (ASCAP), Back In Djibouti (BMI) and Warner Tamerlane Publishing Corp. (BMI) all rights obo Itself and Back In Djibouti administered by Warner-Tamerlane Publishing Corp., Seven Summits Music (BMI) obo Itself and Pink Mic Music (BMI)

Personnel

- Sabrina Carpenter – lead vocals, songwriting, background vocals
- Johan Carlsson – songwriting, production for MXM Productions, vocal production, background vocals, programming, electric guitar
- Ross Golan – songwriting, background vocals
- Noah Passovoy – vocal production
- Mattias Johansson – violin
- Mattias Bylund – string synthesizer, string recording, string editing
- Nils-Petter Ankarblom – string synthesizer, string arrangement
- David Bukovinszky – cello
- Serban Ghenea – mixing
- John Hanes – engineering
- Chris Gehringer – mastering
- Will Quinnell – assistant

Credits adapted from Singular: Act II liner notes.

== Charts ==
Chart (2019)	Peak position
New Zealand Hot Singles (RMNZ)	35

== Release history ==
Region	Date	Format	Label	Ref.
Various	May 3, 2019	Digital download|streaming	Hollywood	
