= KC Lights =

Kerr Slaven (born 5 January 1991), known professionally as KC Lights, is a Scottish DJ, record producer and songwriter.

== History ==
Slaven grew up on the Isle of Bute and attended secondary school in Rothesay. According to Slaven, he initially listened to a mixture of jazz and indie rock, but developed a love for dance music during a trip to Ibiza when he was 17. He subsequently studied music at the University of Aberdeen, where he found an interest in composing dance music.

In 2012, Slaven was signed to Hervé's label Cheap Thrills. Slaven started releasing on the label Toolroom in 2019.

== Influences ==
Slaven cites Jimi Hendrix as an influence growing up, stating "the way he played the guitar like it was connected to his body and mind I found totally mesmerising". When discovering electronic music, Slaven took inspiration from Boys Noize, The Chemical Brothers, and Daft Punk.

== Discography ==
=== Singles ===
- "Girl"
- "Luna"
- "Cold Light" (with Leo Stannard)
- "Share a Little Love" (with Lowes)
- "Better Times" (with Låpsley)
