= Evolution (Sabrina Carpenter album) =

2016 album by Sabrina Carpenter

Studio album by Sabrina Carpenter
- Released: October 14, 2016
- Recorded: January 2015 – August 2016
- Studios: UMPG Studios (Santa Monica, California); Sphere Studios (North Hollywood, California); Rokstone Studios (London, United Kingdom); Loews Hollywood Hotel (Hollywood, California); Blueprint Studios, Roxstone Studios and Kite Music Productions (Los Angeles, California); Faculty Productions
- Genre: Dance-pop
- Length: 33:21
- Label: Hollywood
- Producers: Ido Zmishlany; Steve Mac; Jimmy Robbins; Halatrax; Ryan Ogren; Rob Persaud; DJ Daylight; Nonfiction

Sabrina Carpenter chronology
| Eyes Wide Open (2015) | Evolution (2016) | Singular: Act I (2018) |

Singles from Evolution
- 1. "On Purpose" Released: July 29, 2016; 2. "Thumbs" Released: January 3, 2017

Evolution (Note: stylized as ƎVO⅃UTION.) is the second studio album by American singer Sabrina Carpenter, released on October 14, 2016, by Hollywood Records. Carpenter began recording the album in 2015, shortly after the launch of her first project, Eyes Wide Open until 2016. Musically, Evolution is a dance-pop record, which departs from the folk-pop and teen pop sound of its predecessor. Evolution received positive reviews from music critics and reached number 28 on the US Billboard 200 chart.

== Promotion ==
"Smoke and Fire" was originally intended to be the lead single from Evolution, but it was eventually excluded from the track listing; Carpenter later said that this was due to the "evolution" occurring after the song. Carpenter also said the track "was the first story that I was waiting to tell out of the many stories from the second album", and that she intended for it to be the first single because she felt that it was a great transition from Eyes Wide Open. According to Carpenter, the song's music video "show[s] flashback memories of an innocent love story in the midst of post breakup beauty and heartbreak."

"On Purpose" was released as the lead single from Evolution on July 29, 2016. "Thumbs" impacted Top 40 radio as the second single from the album on January 3, 2017. The album was made available for pre-order alongside the first promotional single, "All We Have Is Love", released on September 23, 2016. "Run and Hide" was released as the second promotional single on September 30. "Thumbs" was initially released as the third and final promotional single on October 7.

=== Live performances ===
To promote the album, Carpenter embarked on the Evolution Tour through the United States from October to December 2016. She also embarked on The De-Tour, in which she toured both the United States and Canada in July and August 2017, featuring Alex Aiono and New Hope Club as special guests. On April 18, 2017, Carpenter performed "Thumbs" on The Late Late Show with James Corden.

In 2017, Carpenter performed "Thumbs", "On Purpose", and "Feels Like Loneliness" at the Pandora Headquarters, with all three performances later released under the title the "Pandora Sessions" on both Pandora and Spotify.

== Critical reception ==
Professional ratings
Review scores
| Source | Rating |
|---|---|
| AllMusic | 3.5/5 stars |
| Andpop | 4/5 stars |

Evolution was met with positive reviews, with critics complimenting Carpenter's sense of maturity and growth on the album in comparison to her debut album. Christine M. Sellers of The Celebrity Cafe wrote that Carpenter "proves she's not just another Disney darling transitioning through her teenage years" and that the album "showcases Carpenter's growth as both a songwriter and a vocalist". Brittany Goldfield Rodrigues of Andpop gave the album 3.8 thumbs up, saying that "with Evolution, Sabrina is showing a mature musical side, willing to experiment with techno beats, lyrics and what she can do vocally. She provides an interesting indie yet synth take on pop music, and has clearly found a unique sound that she shines in, that separates her from the rest". Matt Collar from AllMusic gave the album a rating of 3.5 out of 5, noting its dance-pop sound and describing it as a "mix of heartfelt acoustic balladry, R&B-influenced pop, and dance-oriented anthems.

== Commercial performance ==
Evolution reached number 28 on the US Billboard 200 chart, selling 11,500 copies in its first week.

The album also reached number 44 on the Australian Albums Chart, number 84 on the Canadian Albums Chart, number 98 on the Irish Albums Chart, number 171 on the Dutch Albums Chart, and number 181 on the Flanders Albums Chart.

== Track listing ==
Evolution track listing
| No. | Title | Writer(s) | Producer(s) | Length |
|---|---|---|---|---|
| 1. | "On Purpose" | Sabrina Carpenter; Ido Zmishlany | Zmishlany | 3:58 |
| 2. | "Feels Like Loneliness" | Carpenter; Zmishlany | Zmishlany | 3:20 |
| 3. | "Thumbs" | Priscilla Renea; Steve Mac | Mac | 3:36 |
| 4. | "No Words" | Carpenter; Zmishlany | Zmishlany | 3:32 |
| 5. | "Run and Hide" | Carpenter; Jimmy Robbins | Robbins | 3:29 |
| 6. | "Mirage" | Carpenter; Nick Bailey; Jeff Halavacs; Ryan Ogren | Ogren; Halatrax | 3:25 |
| 7. | "Don't Want It Back" | Carpenter; Steph Jones; Rob Persaud | Persaud | 3:01 |
| 8. | "Shadows" | Carpenter; Jones; Persaud | Persaud | 2:52 |
| 9. | "Space" | Carpenter; Missy Modell; Daniel Kyriakides | Daylight | 3:06 |
| 10. | "All We Have Is Love" | Carpenter; Afshin Salmani; Josh Cumbee | Nonfiction | 3:02 |
| Total length: | | | | 33:21 |

== Credits and personnel ==
Credits adapted from the liner notes of Evolution.

=== Recorded, engineered, mixed and mastered at ===
- Santa Monica, California (UMPG Studios)
- North Hollywood, California (Sphere Studios)
- London, United Kingdom (Rokstone Studios)
- Hollywood, California (Loews Hollywood Hotel)
- Los Angeles, California (Blueprint Studios, Roxstone Studios, Faculty Studios, Kite Music Productions, Sonic Element Studio)
- New York City (Sterling Sound)

=== Performers and production ===
- Sabrina Carpenter – vocals (all tracks); backing vocals (10)
- Ido Zmishlany – production, engineering (1, 2, 4); additional vocal engineering (1); mixing (4)
- Nolan Wescott – piano, vocal engineering (1)
- Serban Ghenea – mixing (1)
- Erik Madrid – mixing (2, 5, 6, 7, 8, 9)
- Jorge Gutierrez – mixing assistant (2, 5, 6, 7, 8, 9)
- Steve Mac – production (3)
- Priscilla Renea – backing vocals (3)
- Chris Laws – engineering (3)
- Dan Pursey – engineering (3)
- Mitch Allan – lead vocals recording (3)
- Phil Tan – mixing (3)
- Jimmy Robbins – production, engineering (5)
- Ryan Ogren – production, engineering, guitar, synth, bass, programming, backing vocals (6)
- Halatrax – production, engineering, programming, backing vocals (6)
- Nick Bailey – backing vocals (6)
- Rob Persaud – production, engineering (7, 8)
- DJ Daylight – production, engineering (9)
- Afshin Salmani – production, engineering, mixing, backing vocals (10)
- Josh Cumbee – production, engineering, mixing, backing vocals (10)
- Chris Gehringer – mastering (all tracks)

=== Design ===
- David Snow – creative direction
- Anabel Sinn – art direction, design
- Harper Smith – photography

== Charts ==
Chart performance
| Chart (2016) | Peak position |
|---|---|
| Australian Albums (ARIA) | 44 |
| Belgian Albums (Ultratop Flanders) | 181 |
| Canadian Albums (Billboard) | 84 |
| Dutch Albums (MegaCharts) | 171 |
| France Downloads Albums (SNEP) | 96 |
| Irish Albums (IRMA) | 98 |
| New Zealand Heatseekers Albums (RMNZ) | 4 |
| UK Download Albums (OCC) | 46 |
| US Billboard 200 | 28 |

== Release history ==
Release history and formats
| Region | Date | Format | Label | Ref. |
|---|---|---|---|---|
| United States | October 14, 2016 | CD; digital download | Hollywood | |
| United States | April 20, 2017 | LP | Hollywood | |
| Various | September 9, 2024 | LP | Disney | |
