= Alien (Jonas Blue and Sabrina Carpenter song) =

2018 song by Jonas Blue and Sabrina Carpenter

Single by Sabrina Carpenter and Jonas Blue
- Released: March 16, 2018
- Recorded: May 2017
- Length: 2:54
- Label: Hollywood
- Songwriters: Sabrina Carpenter; Janee Bennett; Guy James Robin
- Producer: Jonas Blue

Sabrina Carpenter singles chronology
"First Love" (2017)	"Alien" (2018)	"Almost Love" (2018)

Jonas Blue singles chronology
"Hearts Ain't Gonna Lie" (2018)	"Alien" (2018)	"Rise" (2018)

Music video
- "Alien" on YouTube

"Alien" is a song recorded by American singer Sabrina Carpenter and British DJ and record producer Jonas Blue, taken from both the Japanese deluxe editions of Blue's debut album Blue and Carpenter's album Singular: Act I. The track was written by Carpenter, Janee Bennett and its producer Blue. The song was released by Hollywood Records on March 16, 2018. "Alien" describes what it is like to be lost in someone's feelings and how alienating it can be. The song reached number one on Billboard's Dance Club Songs. It was accompanied by a music video directed by Carly Cusson premiered on her Vevo channel on March 29, 2018.

== Background and recording ==
The idea for the song came about during a weekend meeting in London between the two artists. According to Sabrina, she describes what it’s like to be lost in someone’s feelings and how alienating that can be, hence the song's title.

== Composition and lyrical interpretation ==
Musically, "Alien" is a two minutes and fifty-four seconds song. In terms of music notation, "Alien" was composed using 4/4 common time in the key of B flat minor, with a moderate tempo of 106 beats per minute. The song follows the chord progression of G♭maj7-A♭-B♭m(add4)-A♭sus in the verses and Carpenter's vocal range spans from the low note A♭3 to the high note of D♭5, giving the song one octave and three notes of range.

== Music videos ==
It was first released a vertical music video directed by Alexandra Gavillet through Spotify on March 16, 2018 and later on Vevo and YouTube on April 11, 2018. The music video was released through Vevo and YouTube on March 30, 2018 and was directed by Carly Cusson.

== Track listing ==
Digital download
No.	Title	Length
1.	"Alien"	2:54

Digital download – M-22 Remix
No.	Title	Length
1.	"Alien" (M-22 Remix)	3:25

Digital download – Dark Heart Remix
No.	Title	Length
1.	"Alien" (Dark Heart Remix)	3:29

Digital download – acoustic version
No.	Title	Length
1.	"Alien" (Acoustic)	3:24

== Credits and personnel ==
Recording and management

- Mastered at The Erchange Mike Marsh Mastering (Devon, England)
- Seven Summits Music/Pink Mic Music, Universal Music Publishing Ltd, Universal Songs Of PolyGram Int., Inc.

Personnel

- Sabrina Carpenter – lead vocals, songwriting
- Janee Bennett – songwriting
- Jonas Blue – songwriting, production, recording, mixing, arrangement, programming, vocals
- Mike Marsh – vocals, mastering

Credits adapted from Blue (Japanese edition) liner notes.

== Charts ==
=== Weekly charts ===
Chart (2018)	Peak position
New Zealand Heatseekers (RMNZ)	9
US Hot Dance/Electronic Songs (Billboard)	12
US Dance Club Songs (Billboard)	1

=== Year-end charts ===
Chart (2018)	Position
US Dance Club Songs (Billboard)	18
US Hot Dance/Electronic Songs (Billboard)	53

== Certifications ==
Region	Certification	Certified units/sales
Brazil (Pro-Música Brasil)	Gold	20,000^{‡}
^{‡} Sales+streaming figures based on certification alone.

== Release history ==
Country	Date	Format	Ref.
Various	March 16, 2018	Digital download	
Italy	April 6, 2018	Contemporary hit radio	
