= Almost Love (song) =

Single by Sabrina Carpenter

from the album Singular: Act I
- Released: June 6, 2018
- Recorded: Early 2018
- Studio: The Stellar House (Venice, California)
- Genre: Dance-pop
- Length: 3:31
- Label: Hollywood
- Songwriters: Sabrina Carpenter; Steph Jones; Nate Campany; Mikkel Eriksen
- Producer: Stargate

Sabrina Carpenter singles chronology
| "Alien" (2018) | "Almost Love" (2018) | "Sue Me" (2018) |

Music video
- "Almost Love" on YouTube

"Almost Love" is a song recorded by American singer Sabrina Carpenter from her third studio album Singular: Act I (2018), served as the opening track of the album. Described as a dance-pop song, it was written by Sabrina Carpenter, Steph Jones, Nate Campany and Mikkel Eriksen and the production was handled by Stargate. It was released by Hollywood Records as the lead single from Singular: Act I on June 6, 2018.

It was accompanied by a music video directed by Hannah Lux Davis premiered on her Vevo channel on July 12, 2018. It was filmed in May 2018 at Pasadena Museum of History in Pasadena, California and it features Carpenter's romantic partner Noam Sigler. Carpenter promoted "Almost Love" with several live performances, including on Wango Tango on June 2, 2018 and on The Late Late Show with James Corden.

== Background and recording ==
On May 13, Carpenter announced via Twitter that the single would be released on June 6, and a day later she revealed that she would perform the song at Wango Tango, four days before the official release. "Almost Love" was written and recorded on a Monday in early 2018 in three hours and was one of the last songs to be recorded for the album. The concept to the song started when Carpenter saw her phone and it had a note saying the title of the track. Carpenter explained in an interview with BUILD Series LND "I've had these encounters so many times in my life, these almost interactions that never quite turn into anything, and they're these, like, relationships and you never quite finish the story". Carpenter told Billboard that when she was writing the song, she wasn't thinking "I still gotta write that first single." Carpenter said "Listening back to the song when we were done, it had this confidence and this personality in my voice that I hadn’t really had before. Whenever I listened to it, it made me want to physically get up and dance, and I’ve never had a song like that."

The song was written in January 2018 by Sabrina Carpenter, Steph Jones, Nate Campany and Mikkel Eriksen and it was produced by Stargate. Tim Blacksmith and Danny D were the executive producers of the track while Mikkel Eriksen programmed and played all the instruments. Thomas Warren and Eriksen recorded the track at The Stellar House in Venice, California. The song was mixed by Eric J Dubowsky at Hercules St. Studios in Sydney and Tim Watt served as a mix assistant. The song was mastered at Sterling Sound in New York City by Chris Gehringer.

== Composition and lyrical interpretation ==
"Almost Love" is a dance-pop song with an electropop beat. Lyrically, the song is about a relationship that isn't taken seriously by either party. The second verse was the last part to be written and the last lyric to be written, "I want you like a loner wants an empty room", turned out to be Carpenter's favorite lyric on the track.

== Commercial performance ==
"Almost Love" peaked at number 21 on the US Mainstream Top 40 Airplay chart, and reached the summit of the Dance Club Songs chart, placing number three on the year-end tally there.

== Music video ==
=== Background and release ===
A lyric video directed by Elias Tahan accompanied the song's release. It features Carpenter in a karaoke bar. The official music video was released through Vevo and YouTube on July 12, 2018. It was directed by Hannah Lux Davis and was filmed at the Pasadena Museum of History in May 2018.

=== Synopsis ===
The video begins with Carpenter sitting on a couch with her backup dancers reading a book titled "Almost Love". Her backup dancers seem to be giving her suggestions and comments. Carpenter then puts the book down and begins to get up and dance with her backup dancers. After a bit, her backup dancers sit down and she dances on her own. She then opens a glass box of lipstick. She chooses a red one and puts it on. In the next scene, Carpenter is seen walking down and dancing on a staircase and in a walkway with her female backup dancers where she is wearing the red lipstick she chose in the previous scene but has a new outfit on. Her female backup dancers are then seen seducing some men by playing polo and eating ice cream on a lawn. The next scene Carpenter in wearing a sparkly red blazer and dancing in a room with all her backup dancers. She later rips her blazer open. In the final scene, Carpenter is seen taking her love interest (played by Noam Sigler) into a private room. The room looks as though it is from Ancient Greece because of the architecture and plants. Carpenter then gets close with her love interest and they eventually kiss. As they kiss, Carpenter's love interest turns into stone. Specifically, the statue seen in the album artwork. Carpenters female backup dancers do the same thing with their love interests and the same thing happens. Carpenter is then seen in a nightclub scene where she is dancing with her backup dancers. The statue of carpenters "almost" love interest is then seen on display. The video ends with Carpenter pulling a black veil off in the scene on the walkway as well as Carpenter closing the book in the first scene.

=== Critical reception ===
Taylor Fields of IHeartRadio compared Carpenter in the video to the greek myth Medusa saying " While Carpenter does not have snakes for hair in this clip (her super blonde hair looks amazing), she does also turn men into stone — as does her girl squad — with one kiss." Matt Moen of Paper Magazine described the video as "The thrill of will-they-or-won't-they that builds up into that storybook climax." Jordan Miller of BreatheTheHeavy described Carpenter as a "Stone Cold Femme Fatale."

== Live performances ==
Carpenter first performed the song at Wango Tango on June 2, 2018, four days before the release date. On October 1, 2018, Carpenter performed the song on The Late Late Show with James Corden.

== Track listing ==
Digital download
| No. | Title | Length |
|---|---|---|
| 1. | "Almost Love" | 3:31 |

Digital download – R3hab remix
| No. | Title | Length |
|---|---|---|
| 1. | "Almost Love" (R3hab Remix) | 2:55 |

Digital download – Shanti Dope version
| No. | Title | Length |
|---|---|---|
| 1. | "Almost Love" (featuring Shanti Dope) | 3:31 |

Digital EP
| No. | Title | Length |
|---|---|---|
| 1. | "Almost Love" | 3:31 |
| 2. | "Almost Love" (R3hab remix) | 2:55 |
| 3. | "Almost Love" (acoustic) | 3:47 |
| Total length: | | 10:13 |

Digital download – Stargate Warehouse Mix
| No. | Title | Length |
|---|---|---|
| 1. | "Almost Love" (Stargate Warehouse Mix) | 3:20 |

== Credits and personnel ==
Recording and management

- Recorded at The Stellar House (Venice, California)
- Mixed at Hercules St. Studios (Sydney)
- Mastered at Sterling Sound (New York City)
- Seven Summits Music (BMI) obo Itself and Pink Mic Music (BMI), Vistaville Music (ASCAP) obo Itself, Not That Steph Jones (ASCAP) and Big Deal Hits (ASCAP), Dear Cleveland Publishing/Where Da Kasz At/Prescription Songs LLC (BMI) all rights administered by Songs of Kobalt Music Publishing, EMI April Music, Inc. (ASCAP) obo EMI Music Publishing Ltd. (PRS)

Personnel

- Sabrina Carpenter – lead vocals, songwriting
- Steph Jones – songwriting
- Nate Campany – songwriting
- Mikkel Eriksen – songwriting, recording; production for 45th and 3rd Music, LLC, all programming, all instrumentation (as part of Stargate)
- Tim Blacksmith – executive producer for Tim & Danny Music LLC
- Danny D – executive producer for Tim & Danny Music LLC
- Thomas Warren – recording
- Eric J. Dubowsky – mixing
- Tim Watt – mix assistant
- Chris Gehringer – mastering

Credits adapted from Singular: Act I liner notes.

== Charts ==
=== Weekly charts ===
| Chart (2018) | Peak position |
|---|---|
| US Dance Club Songs (Billboard) | 1 |
| US Pop Airplay (Billboard) | 21 |

=== Year-end charts ===
| Chart (2018) | Position |
|---|---|
| US Dance Club Songs (Billboard) | 3 |

== Certifications ==
| Region | Certification | Certified units/sales |
|---|---|---|
| Brazil (Pro-Música Brasil) | Gold | 20,000^{‡} |
^{‡} Sales+streaming figures based on certification alone.

== Release history ==
| Region | Date | Format | Version | Label | Ref. |
|---|---|---|---|---|---|
| United States | June 6, 2018 | Digital download | Original | Hollywood | |
| United States | June 19, 2018 | Contemporary hit radio | Original | Hollywood | |
| Various | July 13, 2018 | Digital download | R3hab Remix | Hollywood | |
| Philippines | August 10, 2018 | Digital download | Shanti Dope version | Hollywood | |
| Various | August 24, 2018 | Digital download | Digital EP | Hollywood | |
| Various | September 28, 2018 | Digital download | Stargate Warehouse Mix | Hollywood | |
