= Sabrina Carpenter discography =

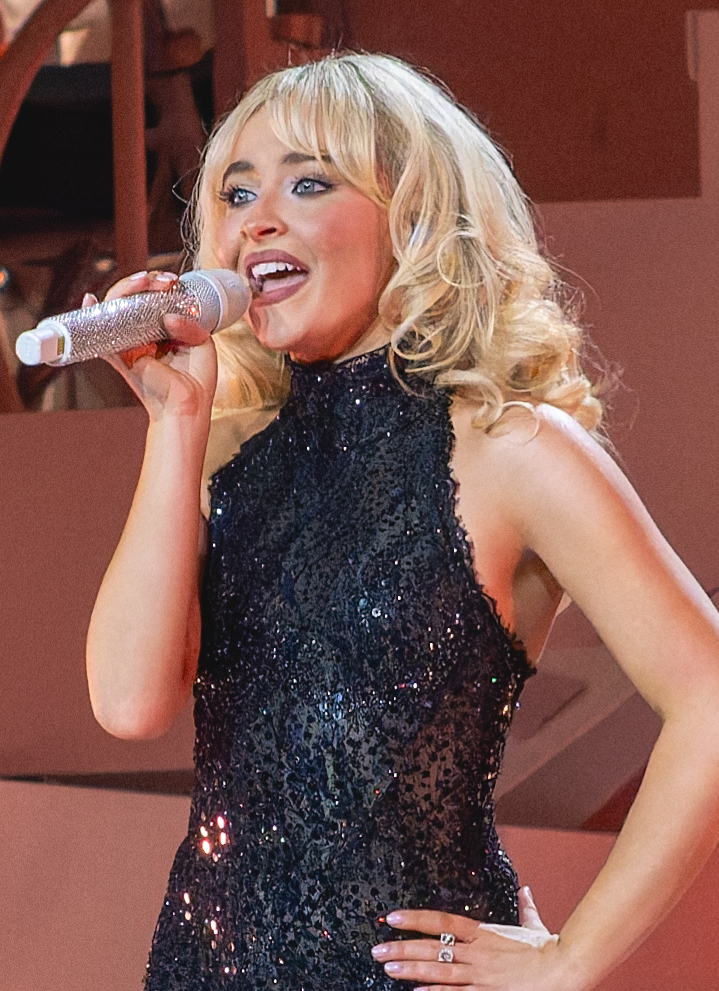
- Sabrina Carpenter performing at O2 Arena on the Short n' Sweet Tour in March 2025
- Studio albums: 7
- EPs: 2
- Singles: 37
- Music videos: 45
- Promotional singles: 27

American singer Sabrina Carpenter has released seven studio albums, two extended plays, 37 singles (including 10 as a featured artist), 27 promotional singles and 45 music videos. Prior to gaining recognition on Disney Channel's Girl Meets World and performing its theme song, Carpenter signed a five-album deal with Hollywood Records. In 2014, she released her debut single "Can't Blame a Girl for Trying" and an EP of the same name, with the latter peaking at number 16 on the Billboard Heatseekers Albums chart. She followed this with her debut album Eyes Wide Open (2015) which debuted at number 43 on the US Billboard 200.

She released her second studio album Evolution (2016), which debuted at number 28. It was accompanied by the singles "On Purpose" and "Thumbs"; the latter of which peaked at number one on the Bubbling Under Hot 100 chart and was certified Platinum by the Recording Industry Association of America (RIAA). She followed-up with her single "Why", which peaked at number 21 on the Bubbling Under Hot 100 and was certified Gold by the RIAA. Her next studio albums were the two-part Singular: Act I (2018) and Singular: Act II (2019). The former album's singles including "Almost Love" and "Sue Me" became consecutive number ones on the US Dance Club Songs chart. She also collaborated with Alan Walker and The Vamps on the song "On My Way" and "Hands" respectively.

Carpenter released various singles from 2020 to 2021 including "Skin", which marked her first release under Island Records and first entry on the Billboard Hot 100 at number 48. Her fifth studio album, Emails I Can't Send (2022) found commercial success, and featured the RIAA Platinum singles "Nonsense" and "Feather", with the latter reaching number one on the US Pop Airplay chart and peaking at number 21 on the Hot 100. She released her first Christmas EP in 2023, Fruitcake, which reached number 3 on the US Top Holiday Albums chart.

In 2024, Carpenter released her sixth studio album Short n' Sweet (2024) which spent multiple weeks atop the Billboard 200. The album garnered various singles including "Espresso", "Please Please Please" and "Taste"; all of which topped various charts worldwide including the US Pop Airplay chart. "Please Please Please" marked her first number one on the Hot 100 while all three songs simultaneously remained in the top ten of the Hot 100 for seven consecutive weeks, a record for any female artist in history. In 2025, Carpenter earned her second number one on the Hot 100 with "Manchild" which debuted atop the chart and included on her seventh studio album, Man's Best Friend (2025).

Throughout her career, Carpenter has collaborated with numerous artists including Madonna, Charlie Puth, Sofia Carson, Zara Larsson, Taylor Swift, and Christina Aguilera. She has also lent her vocals to various soundtracks including that for Disney Fairies: Faith, Trust, and Pixie Dust (2012), Sofia the First (2013), Teen Beach 2 (2015), Sierra Burgess Is a Loser (2018) and Clouds (2020).

== Albums ==
=== Studio albums ===
List of studio albums, with selected details, chart positions, sales, and certifications
Title	Studio album details	Peak chart positions										Sales	Certifications
Title	Studio album details	US	AUS	BEL (FL)	CAN	FRA	IRE	NLD	NZ	SPA	UK	Sales	Certifications
Eyes Wide Open	Released: April 14, 2015; Label: Hollywood; Formats: CD, LP, digital download, streaming	43	—	—	—	— (Note: Eyes Wide Open did not enter the SNEP Chart but peaked at number 181 on French Download Albums.)	—	—	—	—	— (Note: Eyes Wide Open did not enter the UK Albums Chart but peaked at number 93 on UK Download Albums.)	US: 12,000	
Evolution	Released: October 14, 2016; Label: Hollywood; Formats: CD, LP, digital download, streaming	28	44	181	84	— (Note: Evolution did not enter the SNEP Chart but peaked at number 96 on French Download Albums.)	98	171	— (Note: Evolution did not enter the RMNZ Top 40 Albums chart, but peaked at number four on the Heatseeker Albums chart.)	—	— (Note: Evolution did not enter the UK Albums Chart but peaked at number 46 on UK Download Albums.)	US: 11,500	
Singular: Act I	Released: November 9, 2018; Label: Hollywood; Formats: CD, LP, digital download, streaming	103	— (Note: Singular: Act I did not enter the Top 100 Albums Chart, but peaked at number 20 on the Digital Albums Chart.)	—	—	— (Note: Singular: Act I did not enter the SNEP Chart, but peaked at number 84 on French Download Albums.)	—	198	—	—	— (Note: Singular: Act I did not enter the UK Albums Chart, but peaked at number 48 on UK Download Albums, and at number 98 on UK Albums Sales.)		
Singular: Act II	Released: July 19, 2019; Label: Hollywood; Formats: CD, LP, digital download, streaming	138	— (Note: Singular: Act II did not enter the Top 100 Albums chart, but peaked at number 13 on the Digital Albums Chart.)	—	—	— (Note: Singular: Act II did not enter the SNEP Chart but peaked at number 55 on French Download Albums.)	—	—	—	—	— (Note: Singular: Act II did not enter the UK Albums Chart, but peaked at number 53 on the UK Download Albums Chart.)		
Emails I Can't Send	Released: July 15, 2022; Label: Island; Formats: CD, LP, digital download, streaming	23	27	8	32	137	22	6	27	83	21		RIAA: Platinum; ARIA: Gold; BPI: Gold; MC: 2× Platinum; RMNZ: 2× Platinum
Short n' Sweet	Released: August 23, 2024; Label: Island; Formats: CD, LP, cassette, digital download, streaming	1	1	1	1	1	1	1	1	1	1	US: 484,000; UK: 83,234	RIAA: 4× Platinum; ARIA: 2× Platinum; BPI: 3× Platinum; BRMA: 2× Platinum; MC: 5× Platinum; NVPI: Platinum; PROMUSICAE: Platinum; RMNZ: 4× Platinum
Man's Best Friend	Released: August 29, 2025; Label: Island; Formats: CD, LP, cassette, digital download, streaming	1	1	1	1	1	1	1	1	1	1	US: 224,000	RIAA: Platinum; ARIA: Gold; BPI: Platinum; MC: Platinum; PROMUSICAE: Platinum; RMNZ: Platinum
"—" denotes releases that did not chart or were not released in that territory.

== Extended plays ==
List of extended plays, with selected details, chart positions, and sales
Title	Extended play details	Peak chart positions										Sales
Title	Extended play details	US	US Hol.	AUS	BEL (FL)	CAN	IRE	NLD	NZ	SPA	UK	Sales
Can't Blame a Girl for Trying	Released: April 8, 2014; Label: Hollywood; Format: CD, digital download, streaming	— (Note: Can't Blame a Girl for Trying did not enter the US Billboard 200, but peaked at number 16 on the US Heatseekers Albums chart.)	—	—	—	—	—	—	—	—	—	US: 17,000
Fruitcake	Released: November 17, 2023; Label: Island; Format: CD, LP, cassette, digital download, streaming	10	3	14	6	29	17	2	31	8	5	US: 39,000
"—" denotes releases that did not chart or were not released in that territory.

== Singles ==
=== As lead artist ===
List of singles as lead artist, showing year released, selected chart positions, certifications, and originating album
Title	Year	Peak chart positions										Certifications	Album
Title	Year	US	AUS	CAN	IRE	NOR	NZ	SWE	SWI	UK	WW	Certifications	Album
"Can't Blame a Girl for Trying"	2014	—	—	—	—	—	—	—	—	—	—	RIAA: Gold	Can't Blame a Girl for Trying
"We'll Be the Stars"	2015	—	—	—	—	—	—	—	—	—	—		Eyes Wide Open
"Eyes Wide Open"	2015	—	—	—	—	—	—	—	—	—	—	RIAA: Gold	Eyes Wide Open
"Smoke and Fire"	2016	—	—	—	—	—	—	—	—	—	—		Non-album single
"On Purpose"	2016	— (Note: "On Purpose" did not enter the US Billboard Hot 100, but peaked at number 39 on the US Pop Digital Songs chart.)	—	—	—	—	—	—	—	—	—		Evolution
"Thumbs"	2017	— (Note: "Thumbs" did not enter the US Billboard Hot 100, but peaked at number one on the US Bubbling Under Hot 100 Singles chart.)	173	—	—	19	—	88	—	—	—	RIAA: 2× Platinum; ARIA: Platinum; BPI: Silver; IFPI NOR: Platinum; RMNZ: Gold	Evolution
"Hands" (with Mike Perry and The Vamps)	2017	—	—	—	—	—	—	70	—	— (Note: "Hands" did not enter the UK Singles Chart, but peaked at number 58 on the UK Singles Download Chart and at number 59 on the UK Singles Sales Chart.)	—	GLF: Gold	Night & Day (Night Edition)
"Why" (Note: "Why" appears on the Japanese CD edition of Singular: Act I.)	2017	— (Note: "Why" did not enter the US Billboard Hot 100, but peaked at number 21 on the US Bubbling Under Hot 100 Singles chart.)	—	—	—	—	— (Note: "Why" did not enter the NZ Top 40 Singles Chart, but peaked at number eight on the NZ Heatseakers Chart.)	—	—	—	—	RIAA: Gold; ARIA: Platinum; RMNZ: Gold	Non-album singles
"Alien" (Note: "Alien" appears on the Japanese CD editions of Singular: Act I and Jonas Blue's album Blue.) (with Jonas Blue)	2018	— (Note: "Alien" did not enter the US Billboard Hot 100, but peaked at number one on the US Dance Club Songs chart.)	— (Note: "Alien" did not enter the Top 100 Singles Chart, but peaked at number 3 on the Hitseekers Singles chart.)	—	—	—	— (Note: "Alien" did not enter the NZ Top 40 Singles Chart, but peaked at number nine on the NZ Heatseakers Chart.)	—	—	—	—		Non-album singles
"Almost Love"	2018	— (Note: "Almost Love" did not enter the US Billboard Hot 100, but peaked at number one on the US Dance Club Songs chart.)	—	—	—	—	—	—	—	—	—		Singular: Act I
"Sue Me"	2018	— (Note: "Sue Me" did not enter the US Billboard Hot 100, but peaked at number one on the US Dance Club Songs chart.)	—	—	—	—	—	—	—	—	—	RIAA: Platinum; ARIA: Platinum; BPI: Silver; RMNZ: Gold	Singular: Act I
"On My Way" (Note: Carpenter is credited as a lead artist for "On My Way" by most sources including the iTunes Store and Spotify but is credited as a featured artist on most promotional videos and photos for the song.) (with Alan Walker and Farruko)	2019	— (Note: "On My Way" did not enter the Billboard Hot 100, but peaked at number 8 on the US Hot Dance/Electronic Songs chart.)	—	—	69	3	— (Note: "On My Way" did not enter the NZ Top 40 Singles Chart, but peaked at number 31 on the NZ Hot Singles Chart.)	30	34	—	—	GLF: Platinum; MC: Gold; RMNZ: Gold	World of Walker
"In My Bed"	2019	—	—	—	—	—	—	—	—	—	—		Singular: Act II
"Skin"	2021	48	61	36	12	—	— (Note: "Skin" did not enter the NZ Top 40 Singles Chart, but peaked at number one on the NZ Hot Singles Chart.)	—	99	28	33	RIAA: Gold; ARIA: Gold; BPI: Silver; RMNZ: Gold	Non-album single
"Skinny Dipping"	2021	—	—	—	—	—	—	—	—	—	—		Emails I Can't Send
"Fast Times"	2022	—	—	—	—	—	— (Note: "Fast Times" did not enter the NZ Top 40 Singles Chart, but peaked at number 34 on the NZ Hot Singles Chart.)	—	—	—	—	RIAA: Gold; ARIA: Gold	Emails I Can't Send
"Vicious"	2022	—	—	—	—	—	— (Note: "Vicious" did not enter the NZ Top 40 Singles Chart, but peaked at number 26 on the NZ Hot Singles Chart.)	—	—	—	—	ARIA: Gold	Emails I Can't Send
"Because I Liked a Boy"	2022	—	—	—	86	—	— (Note: "Because I Liked a Boy" did not enter the NZ Top 40 Singles Chart, but peaked at number six on the NZ Hot Singles Chart.)	—	—	—	—	RIAA: Platinum; ARIA: Platinum; BPI: Gold; MC: Platinum; RMNZ: Platinum	Emails I Can't Send
"Nonsense"	2022	56	23	37	20	—	31	— (Note: "Nonsense" did not enter the Swedish Singellista Chart, but peaked at number two on the Swedish Heatseeker Chart.)	—	32	35	RIAA: 4× Platinum; ARIA: 4× Platinum; BPI: Platinum; GLF: Gold; MC: 5× Platinum; RMNZ: 3× Platinum	Emails I Can't Send
"A Nonsense Christmas"	2022	— (Note: "A Nonsense Christmas" did not enter the US Billboard Hot 100, but peaked at number 79 on the US Holiday 100 chart.)	23	—	9	—	— (Note: "A Nonsense Christmas" did not enter the NZ Top 40 Singles Chart, but peaked at number 39 on the NZ Hot Singles Chart.)	— (Note: "A Nonsense Christmas" did not enter the Swedish Singellista Chart, but peaked at number four on the Swedish Heatseeker Chart.)	64	16	70		Fruitcake
"Feather"	2023	21	22	25	25	—	40	—	—	19	43	RIAA: 2× Platinum; ARIA: 4× Platinum; BPI: Platinum; GLF: Gold; MC: 4× Platinum; RMNZ: 2× Platinum	Emails I Can't Send Fwd
"Espresso"	2024	3	1	3	1	2	2	4	2	1	1	RIAA: 8× Platinum; ARIA: 10× Platinum; BPI: 5× Platinum; GLF: 2× Platinum; IFPI SWI: 2× Platinum; MC: 8× Platinum; RMNZ: 6× Platinum	Short n' Sweet
"Please Please Please"	2024	1	1	3	1	1	1	6	12	1	1	RIAA: 5× Platinum; ARIA: 6× Platinum; BPI: 3× Platinum; GLF: Platinum; IFPI SWI: Gold; MC: 7× Platinum; RMNZ: 4× Platinum	Short n' Sweet
"Taste"	2024	2	1	4	1	2	2	9	22	1	2	RIAA: 4× Platinum; ARIA: 6× Platinum; BPI: 3× Platinum; GLF: Platinum; IFPI SWI: Gold; MC: 5× Platinum; RMNZ: 3× Platinum	Short n' Sweet
"Bed Chem"	2024	14	10	17	5	50	9	65	—	6	14	RIAA: 2× Platinum; ARIA: 3× Platinum; BPI: Platinum; MC: 3× Platinum; RMNZ: 2× Platinum	Short n' Sweet
"Busy Woman"	2025	27	22	38	5	16	20	49	—	6	23	RIAA: Platinum; ARIA: Platinum; BPI: Platinum; MC: Platinum; RMNZ: Platinum	Short n' Sweet (Deluxe)
"Manchild"	2025	1	2	2	1	12	2	13	12	1	2	RIAA: Platinum; ARIA: 2× Platinum; BPI: 2× Platinum; GLF: Gold; MC: 2× Platinum; RMNZ: Platinum	Man's Best Friend
"Tears"	2025	3	3	4	3	9	5	9	10	3	2	RIAA: Gold; ARIA: Platinum; BPI: Platinum; MC: Platinum; RMNZ: Platinum	Man's Best Friend
"When Did You Get Hot?"	2026	17	13	19	8	25	15	72	—	9	14	RIAA: Gold; ARIA: Platinum; BPI: Gold; MC: Platinum; RMNZ: Platinum	Man's Best Friend
"House Tour"	2026	27	20	23	22	—	36	94	—	17	21	ARIA: Gold; BPI: Gold; MC: Gold; RMNZ: Gold	Man's Best Friend
"Bring Your Love" (with Madonna)	2026	74	88	51	44	—	— (Note: "Bring Your Love" did not enter the NZ Top 40 Singles Chart, but peaked at number 4 on the NZ Hot Singles Chart.)	—	75	29	91		Confessions II
"—" denotes releases that did not chart or were not released in that territory.

=== As featured artist ===
List of singles as featured artist, showing year released, selected chart positions, certifications, and originating album
Title	Year	Peaks	Certifications	Album
Title	Year	US Dance	Certifications	Album
"First Love" (Lost Kings featuring Sabrina Carpenter)	2017	26		We Are Lost Kings (Japan EP)
"Tricky" (Shoffy featuring Sabrina Carpenter)	2020	—		Flash
"Wow" (Remix) (Zara Larsson featuring Sabrina Carpenter)	2020	—		Non-album singles
"That's Not How This Works" (Sabrina's version) (Charlie Puth featuring Dan + Shay and Sabrina Carpenter)	2023	—		Non-album singles
"Cupid" (Twin version) (Fifty Fifty featuring Sabrina Carpenter)	2023	—	ARIA: 2× Platinum	The Beginning
"You Need Me Now?" (Girl in Red featuring Sabrina Carpenter)	2024	—		I'm Doing It Again Baby!
"—" denotes releases that did not chart or were not released in that territory.

=== Promotional singles ===
List of promotional singles, showing year released, selected chart positions, and originating album
Title	Year	Peak chart positions			Album
Title	Year	US KDS	US Hol. Digital	NZ Hot	Album
"Catch My Breath"	2010	—	—	—	Non-album promotional singles
"Fall Apart"	2011	—	—	—	Non-album promotional singles
"Make You Feel My Love" (with Sarah Carpenter featuring Nathaniel Hawk and Cameron Hawk)	2011	—	—	—	Non-album promotional singles
"Safe and Sound"	2012	—	—	—	Non-album promotional singles
"I'll Be Home for Christmas" (with Ali Brustofski and Danielle Lowe)	2012	—	—	—	Christmas Past & Presents
"Take on the World" (Girl Meets World theme song) (with Rowan Blanchard)	2014	1	—	—	Non-album promotional singles
"Silver Nights"	2014	—	23	—	Non-album promotional singles
"Stand Out" (Note: "Stand Out" was released as a standalone promotional single for the movie How to Build a Better Boy.)	2014	6	—	—	Non-album promotional singles
"Christmas the Whole Year Round"	2015	—	17	—	A Hollywood Christmas
"Wildside" (from Adventures in Babysitting) (with Sofia Carson)	2016	4	—	—	Your Favorite Songs from 100 Disney Channel Original Movies
"A Dream Is a Wish Your Heart Makes / So This Is Love"	2016	—	—	—	Non-album promotional single
"All We Have Is Love"	2016	—	—	—	Evolution
"Run and Hide"	2016	—	—	—	Evolution
"Santa Claus Is Coming to Town" (DNCE featuring Charlie Puth, Hailee Steinfeld, Daya, Fifth Harmony, Rita Ora, Tinashe, Sabrina Carpenter and Jake Miller)	2016	—	—	—	Non-album promotional singles
"Sign of the Times" (with Jasmine Thompson)	2017	—	—	—	Non-album promotional singles
"Tomorrow Starts Today" (Andi Mack theme song)	2017	—	—	—	Non-album promotional singles
"Have Yourself a Merry Little Christmas"	2017	—	14	—	A Hollywood Christmas
"Paris"	2018	—	—	—	Singular: Act I
"Bad Time"	2018				Singular: Act I
"Pushing 20"	2019	—	—	—	Singular: Act II
"Exhale"	2019	—	—	35	Singular: Act II
"I'm Fakin"	2019	—	—	—	Singular: Act II
"Honeymoon Fades"	2020	—	—	—	Non-album promotional single
"Perfect Song" (Royalties Cast featuring Sabrina Carpenter)	2020	—	—	—	Royalties
"Let Me Move You" (Note: "Let Me Move You" was released as a standalone promotional single for the movie Work It.)	2020	—	—	—	Non-album promotional single
"Clouds" (with Fin Argus)	2020	—	—	—	Clouds
"Colorful" (as part of Colorful) (Note: The Japanese branch of Coca-Cola formed “Team Coca-Cola“, a musical project in support of the Tokyo 2020 Olympic and Paralympic Games. (Performed by Ai, Motohiro Hata, Little Glee Monster, Daichi Miura, Perfume, Taemin (Shinee), Miyavi, Nasty C, Sabrina Carpenter, Ayumu Imazu, Blue Vintage, Mizki, Sanari, Chikuzen Sato (Sing Like Talking) as Colorful).)	2021	*	—	—	Non-album promotional single
"—" denotes releases that did not chart or were not released in that territory. "*" denotes the chart did not exist at that time.

== Other charted and certified songs ==
List of other charted songs, showing year released, selected chart positions, certifications, and originating album
Title	Year	Peak chart positions										Certifications	Album
Title	Year	US	AUS	CAN	IRE	NZ	PHI	POR	SWE	UK	WW	Certifications	Album
"Rescue Me"	2015	— (Note: "Rescue Me" did not enter the US Billboard Hot 100, but peaked at number ten on the Billboard Kid Digital Songs.)	—	—	—	—	—	—	—	—	—		Teen Beach 2
"I Can't Stop Me" (featuring Saweetie)	2019	—	—	—	—	— (Note: "I Can't Stop Me" did not enter the NZ Top 40 Singles Chart, but peaked at number 39 on the NZ Hot Singles Chart.)	—	—	—	—	—		Singular: Act II
"Looking at Me"	2019	—	—	—	—	—	—	—	—	—	—	RIAA: Gold; ARIA: Platinum; BPI: Silver; MC: Gold; RMNZ: Gold	Singular: Act II
"Emails I Can't Send"	2022	—	—	—	—	— (Note: "Emails I Can't Send" did not enter the NZ Top 40 Singles Chart, but peaked at number 28 on the NZ Hot Singles Chart.)	—	—	—	—	—	RIAA: Gold; ARIA: Gold; BPI: Silver	Emails I Can't Send
"Read Your Mind"	2022	—	—	—	—	— (Note: "Read Your Mind" did not enter the NZ Top 40 Singles Chart, but peaked at number 37 on the NZ Hot Singles Chart.)	—	—	—	—	—	ARIA: Gold; BPI: Silver	Emails I Can't Send
"Already Over"	2022	—	—	—	—	— (Note: "Already Over" did not enter the NZ Top 40 Singles Chart, but peaked at number 40 on the NZ Hot Singles Chart.)	—	—	—	—	—		Emails I Can't Send
"Buy Me Presents"	2023	—	—	—	—	— (Note: "Buy Me Presents" did not enter the NZ Top 40 Singles Chart, but peaked at number 26 on the NZ Hot Singles Chart.)	—	—	—	83	—		Fruitcake
"Santa Doesn't Know You Like I Do"	2023	—	—	87	—	— (Note: "Santa Doesn't Know You Like I Do" did not enter the NZ Top 40 Singles Chart, but peaked at number 16 on the NZ Hot Singles Chart.)	50	—	— (Note: "Santa Doesn't Know You Like I Do" did not enter the Swedish Singellista Chart, but peaked at number nine on the Swedish Heatseeker Chart.)	—	164		Fruitcake
"Cindy Lou Who"	2023	—	—	—	—	— (Note: "Cindy Lou Who" did not enter the NZ Top 40 Singles Chart, but peaked at number 29 on the NZ Hot Singles Chart.)	—	—	—	—	—		Fruitcake
"Is It New Years Yet?"	2023	—	—	—	—	— (Note: "Is It New Years Yet?" did not enter the NZ Top 40 Singles Chart, but peaked at number 40 on the NZ Hot Singles Chart.)	—	—	—	—	—		Fruitcake
"Good Graces"	2024	15	12	16	—	17	30	28	— (Note: "Good Graces" did not enter the Swedish Singellista Chart, but peaked at number 17 on the Swedish Heatseeker Chart.)	— (Note: "Good Graces" did not enter the UK Official Singles Chart, but peaked at number 19 on the UK Streaming Chart.)	15	RIAA: Platinum; ARIA: Platinum; BPI: Gold; MC: Platinum; RMNZ: Platinum	Short n' Sweet
"Sharpest Tool"	2024	21	20	27	—	20	92	42	—	— (Note: "Sharpest Tool" did not enter the UK Official Singles Chart, but peaked at number 30 on the UK Streaming Chart.)	23	RIAA: Gold; ARIA: Gold; BPI: Silver; MC: Platinum; RMNZ: Gold	Short n' Sweet
"Coincidence"	2024	26	—	31	—	23	—	48	—	— (Note: "Coincidence" did not enter the UK Official Singles Chart, but peaked at number 31 on the UK Streaming Chart.)	25	RIAA: Gold; ARIA: Platinum; BPI: Silver; MC: Platinum; RMNZ: Gold	Short n' Sweet
"Dumb & Poetic"	2024	32	33	40	—	33	—	81	—	— (Note: "Dumb & Poetic" did not enter the UK Official Singles Chart, but peaked at number 45 on the UK Streaming Chart.)	35	RIAA: Gold; ARIA: Gold; BPI: Silver; MC: Gold	Short n' Sweet
"Slim Pickins"	2024	27	24	33	—	28	—	72	—	— (Note: "Slim Pickins" did not enter the UK Official Singles Chart, but peaked at number 36 on the UK Streaming Chart.)	30	RIAA: Gold; ARIA: Gold; BPI: Silver; MC: Gold; RMNZ: Gold	Short n' Sweet
"Juno"	2024	22	19	25	14	19	26	54	94	24	22	RIAA: Platinum; ARIA: 2× Platinum; BPI: Platinum; MC: 2× Platinum; RMNZ: Platinum	Short n' Sweet
"Lie to Girls"	2024	41	38	46	—	—	—	115	—	— (Note: "Lie to Girls" did not enter the UK Official Singles Chart, but peaked at number 60 on the UK Streaming Chart.)	45	RIAA: Gold; ARIA: Gold; MC: Gold	Short n' Sweet
"Don't Smile"	2024	35	—	45	—	36	—	119	—	— (Note: "Don't Smile" did not enter the UK Official Singles Chart, but peaked at number 58 on the UK Streaming Chart.)	39	RIAA: Gold; ARIA: Gold; BPI: Silver; MC: Platinum; RMNZ: Gold	Short n' Sweet
"15 Minutes"	2025	67	59	64	54	— (Note: "15 Minutes" did not enter the NZ Top 40 Singles Chart, but peaked at number 6 on the NZ Hot Singles Chart.)	—	—	—	— (Note: "15 Minutes" did not enter the UK Official Singles Chart, but peaked at number 38 on the UK Streaming Chart.)	72	ARIA: Gold; BPI: Silver	Short n' Sweet (Deluxe)
"Couldn't Make It Any Harder"	2025	84	—	76	—	— (Note: "Couldn't Make It Any Harder" did not enter the NZ Top 40 Singles Chart, but peaked at number 7 on the NZ Hot Singles Chart.)	—	—	—	— (Note: "Couldn't Make It Any Harder" did not enter the UK Official Singles Chart, but peaked at number 73 on the UK Streaming Chart.)	126		Short n' Sweet (Deluxe)
"Bad Reviews"	2025	87	—	79	—	— (Note: "Bad Reviews" did not enter the NZ Top 40 Singles Chart, but peaked at number 8 on the NZ Hot Singles Chart.)	—	—	—	— (Note: "Bad Reviews" did not enter the UK Official Singles Chart, but peaked at number 77 on the UK Streaming Chart.)	144		Short n' Sweet (Deluxe)
"My Man on Willpower"	2025	15	15	20	9	16	51	20	60	7	10	BPI: Silver	Man's Best Friend
"Sugar Talking"	2025	20	20	22	75	19	74	24	70	65	15	BPI: Silver	Man's Best Friend
"We Almost Broke Up Again Last Night"	2025	31	27	35	—	26	91	32	— (Note: "We Almost Broke Up Again Last Night" did not enter the Swedish Singellista Chart, but peaked at number one on the Swedish Heatseeker Chart.)	— (Note: "We Almost Broke Up Again Last Night" did not enter the UK Official Singles Chart, but peaked at number 22 on the UK Streaming Chart.)	25		Man's Best Friend
"Nobody's Son"	2025	12	19	18	8	18	23	25	74	68	12	RIAA: Gold; ARIA: Gold; BPI: Gold; MC: Platinum; RMNZ: Gold	Man's Best Friend
"Never Getting Laid"	2025	30	28	34	—	29	85	34	— (Note: "Never Getting Laid" did not enter the Swedish Singellista Chart, but peaked at number three on the Swedish Heatseeker Chart.)	— (Note: "Never Getting Laid" did not enter the UK Official Singles Chart, but peaked at number 28 on the UK Streaming Chart.)	26		Man's Best Friend
"Go Go Juice"	2025	24	21	26	—	20	—	23	86	— (Note: "Go Go Juice" did not enter the UK Official Singles Chart, but peaked at number 16 on the UK Streaming Chart.)	19	BPI: Silver	Man's Best Friend
"Don't Worry I'll Make You Worry"	2025	39	32	41	—	32	—	46	— (Note: "Don't Worry I'll Make You Worry" did not enter the Swedish Singellista Chart, but peaked at number 15 on the Swedish Heatseeker Chart.)	— (Note: "Don't Worry I'll Make You Worry" did not enter the UK Official Singles Chart, but peaked at number 32 on the UK Streaming Chart.)	34		Man's Best Friend
"Goodbye"	2025	33	26	33	—	23	—	18	96	— (Note: "Goodbye" did not enter the UK Official Singles Chart, but peaked at number 19 on the UK Streaming Chart.)	23	BPI: Silver	Man's Best Friend
"The Life of a Showgirl" (Taylor Swift featuring Sabrina Carpenter)	2025	8	6	6	—	7	9	11	6	46	8	ARIA: Gold; BPI: Gold; MC: Platinum; RMNZ: Gold	The Life of a Showgirl
"Such a Funny Way"	2025	63	—	71	37	—	—	—	—	37	—		Man's Best Friend (Special Edition)
"—" denotes releases that did not chart in that territory.

== Guest appearances ==
List of other appearances, showing year released, other artist(s) credited and album name
Title	Year	Other artist(s)	Album
"Smile"	2012	—N/a	Disney Fairies: Faith, Trust, and Pixie Dust
"All You Need" (Note: Credited as Princess Vivian.)	2013	Ariel Winter	Sofia the First
"It’s Finally Christmas"	2013	—N/a	Holidays Unwrapped
"I Still Haven't Found What I'm Looking For"	2014	Peter Hollens	Peter Hollens
"Lie for Love"	2018	—N/a	Sierra Burgess Is a Loser
"Your Name"	2020	Morgan Kibby	The Short History of the Long Road
"Blueberries"	2020	—N/a	Clouds
"Fix Me Up"	2020	Fin Argus	Clouds
"How to Go to Confession"	2020	—N/a	Clouds
"What a Girl Wants"	2024	Christina Aguilera	The 25th Anniversary of Christina Aguilera (Spotify Anniversaries Live)
"The Life of a Showgirl"	2025	Taylor Swift	The Life of a Showgirl

== Music videos ==
List of music videos, showing year released and directors
Title	Year	Other artist(s)	Director(s)	Ref.
As lead artist
"Catch My Breath"	2010	None	David Carpenter	
"Fall Apart"	2011	None	Hank Devos	
"Can't Blame a Girl for Trying"	2014	None	Kinga Burza	
"The Middle of Starting Over"	2014	None	The Young Astronauts	
"We'll Be the Stars"	2015	None	Sarah McClung	
"Eyes Wide Open"	2015	None	Sarah McClung	
"Smoke and Fire"	2016	None	Jessie Hill	
"Wildside" (Lyric video)	2016	Sofia Carson	Chase Langley	
"On Purpose"	2016	None	James Miller	
"Thumbs"	2017	None	Hayley Young	
"Why"	2017	None	Jay Martin	
"Tomorrow Starts Today"	2017	None	Unknown	
"Alien" (Vertical video)	2018	Jonas Blue	Alexandra Gavillet	
"Alien"	2018	Jonas Blue	Carly Cussen	
"Almost Love" (Lyric video)	2018	None	Elias Tahan	
"Almost Love"	2018	None	Hannah Lux Davis	
"Sue Me" (Vertical video)	2018	None	Carlos Baez	
"Sue Me"	2018	None	Lauren Dunn	
"Paris"	2018	None	Jasper Cable-Alexander	
"Pushing 20" (Lyric video)	2019	None	Amber Park	
"On My Way"	2019	Alan Walker and Farruko	Kristian Berg	
"On My Way" (Alternate video)	2019	Alan Walker and Farruko	Alexander Zarate Frez and Frederic Esnault	
"Exhale"	2019	None	Mowgly Lee	
"In My Bed"	2019	None	Phillip R. Lopez	
"Skin"	2021	None	Jason Lester	
"Skinny Dipping"	2021	None	Amber Park	
"Fast Times"	2022	None	Amber Park	
"Because I Liked a Boy"	2022	None	Amber Park	
"Nonsense"	2022	None	Danica Kleinknecht	
"Feather"	2023	None	Mia Barnes	
"Santa Doesn't Know You Like I Do"	2023	None	Rebekah Campbell	
"Espresso"	2024	None	Dave Meyers	
"Please Please Please"	2024	None	Bardia Zeinali	
"Taste"	2024	None	Dave Meyers	
"Please Please Please"	2025	Dolly Parton	Sabrina Carpenter and Sean Price Williams	
"Manchild"	2025	None	Vania Heymann and Gal Muggia	
"Tears"	2025	None	Bardia Zeinali	
"House Tour"	2026	None	Sabrina Carpenter and Margaret Qualley	
"Bring Your Love"	2026	Madonna	TORSO	
As featured artist
"First Love"	2017	Lost Kings	Tyler Bailey	
"You're a Mean One, Mr. Grinch"	2018	Lindsey Stirling	Joshua Shultz and Lindsey Stirling	
"Wow (Remix)"	2020	Zara Larsson	None	
Guest appearances
"Do You Want to Build a Snowman?"	2014	Disney Channel Circle of Stars	Harry Perry III	
"If the World Was Ending" (In Support of Doctors Without Borders)	2020	JP Saxe, Julia Michaels & Friends	None	
"That's Not How This Works"	2023	Charlie Puth and Dan + Shay	Phillip R. Lopez	

== Footnotes ==
Notes for albums and songs

Notes for peak chart positions
