= Emails I Can't Send Tour =

2022–23 concert tour by Sabrina Carpenter

- World tour by Sabrina Carpenter
- Promotional poster
- Location: Asia; Europe; North America; South America
- Associated album: Emails I Can't Send
- Start date: September 29, 2022
- End date: August 4, 2023
- Legs: 6
- No. of shows: 77
- Supporting acts: Girlhouse; Spill Tab; Blu DeTiger; Annika Bennett

Sabrina Carpenter concert chronology
- Singular Tour (2019); Emails I Can't Send Tour (2022–2023); Short n' Sweet Tour (2024–2025)

The Emails I Can't Send Tour was the fourth headlining concert tour by American singer Sabrina Carpenter in support of her fifth studio album Emails I Can't Send (2022). The tour began on September 29, 2022, in Atlanta, United States, and concluded on August 4, 2023, in Chicago, United States, comprising 80 shows throughout three legs in North America, and one leg each in South America, Europe, and Asia.

== Background ==
On July 31, 2022, Carpenter posted a childhood picture of herself on her Instagram account, with the caption, "What songs would you guys wanna hear on tour [...] asking for a friend" – hinting at a tour. In an interview with Vogue in early August, she revealed that with her new album being close to her, she felt a tour in support of it would be "possibly the most fun show" she has ever been able to perform on – and was "very excited" for it.

On August 15, 2022, Carpenter announced the Emails I Can't Send Tour in support of her fifth studio album, Emails I Can't Send (2022), revealing the date schedule, locations, and venues for 12 shows. It marked her first concert tour in three years since her previous Singular Tour (2019). Carpenter announced on September 24, 2022 that Girlhouse would serve as the opening act.

Due to demand in the original shows' pre-sale, a second date in New York City was added for October 5, 2022. A date in Toronto, Canada was also added for October 10, 2022. On September 27, 2022, Carpenter announced that the opening show would be postponed due to safety concerns caused by Hurricane Ian marking the tour's official start date as September 29, 2022. In a digital cover story for American Songwriter in late October, Carpenter confirmed that an extension of the tour would follow with dates scheduled for 2023.

On December 12, 2022, she announced a second North American leg of the tour, scheduled from March to late May 2023, comprising 39 dates (3 added by demand so far), and also revealed that international dates will be incorporated in the future. Carpenter further said that "some new songs" would be performed. On January 30, 2023, the third leg of the tour was announced, consisting of 10 shows taking place in Europe and the United Kingdom.

Her concert in Portland, Oregon was cancelled due to a bomb threat.

=== Ticketing ===
Pre-sale for the initial first leg commenced on August 16, 2022. Tickets and VIP packages went on sale to the general public on August 19, 2022, via Ticketmaster. American Express cardholders had exclusive access two days earlier, from August 17 through the evening of August 18.

== Accolades ==
Awards and nominations for Emails I Can't Send Tour
Organization	Year	Category	Result	Ref.
Nickelodeon Kids' Choice Awards	2024	Favorite Ticket of the Year	Nominated	

== Set list ==
=== 2022 ===
The following set list is from the show in Atlanta on September 29, 2022. It does not represent all concerts for the duration of the tour.

1. "Emails I Can't Send"
2. "Bet U Wanna"
3. "Vicious"
4. "Read Your Mind"
5. "Already Over" / "Bad for Business" / "Skinny Dipping"
6. "Tornado Warnings"
7. "How Many Things"
8. "Can't Blame a Girl for Trying"
9. "Bust Your Windows"
10. "Nonsense"
11. "Paris"
12. "Honeymoon Fades"
13. "Sue Me"
14. "Fast Times"

Encore

15. "Decode"
16. "Because I Liked a Boy"

=== 2023 ===
The following set list is from the show in Hollywood on March 16, 2023. It does not represent all concerts for the duration of the tour.

1. "Emails I Can't Send"
2. "Read Your Mind"
3. "Feather"
4. "Vicious"
5. "Already Over"
6. "Bad for Business"
7. "Skinny Dipping"
8. "Tornado Warnings"
9. "Opposite"
10. "Bet U Wanna"
11. "Dreams"
12. "How Many Things"
13. "Fast Times"
14. "Paris"
15. "Honeymoon Fades"
16. "Sue Me"
17. "Decode"

Encore

18. "Nonsense"
19. "Because I Liked a Boy"

=== Notes ===
- Carpenter performed "Lonesome" in Houston, San Antonio, and Denver.
- "Things I Wish You Said" was performed in New Orleans, Dallas, and Tulsa. It was eventually added to the set list on April 1, 2023.
- On May 11, 2023, in New York, Carpenter performed "Skin" and a short snippet of "Thumbs" was played before Nonsense.

=== Covers ===
The following is a list of covers Carpenter sang throughout the tour.

- During the first shows in Atlanta and Toronto and the concerts in Orlando and Wheatland, "Bust Your Windows" by Jazmine Sullivan.
- During the show in Baltimore, "It's Too Late" by Carole King.
- During the first Boston concert and the shows in Tempe, Houston, Calgary, Las Vegas, Mesa, Nashville, Indianapolis and Manchester, "You're So Vain" by Carly Simon.
- During the shows in Vancouver and Seattle, "Man! I Feel Like a Woman!" by Shania Twain.
- During the first shows in New York City and San Diego, "Like a Virgin" by Madonna.
- During the shows in Hollywood, Garden City, and Chesterfield, "Dreams" by Fleetwood Mac.
- During the first San Francisco concert and the shows in St. Petersburg, San Antonio, Tulsa, Salt Lake City, Kansas City, Birmingham, and Quezon City, "...Baby One More Time" by Britney Spears.
- During the shows in New Orleans, Dallas, Denver, and Edmonton, "Hopelessly Devoted to You" by Olivia Newton-John.
- During the second Los Angeles concert and the Madison show, "A Thousand Miles" by Vanessa Carlton.
- During shows in BST Hyde Park, Osaka, Lollapalooza, and Good Vibes Festival in Kuala Lumpur, "Lay All Your Love On Me" by ABBA.
- During the first show in New York, "Tongue Tied" by Grouplove.
- During the shows in London and the Isle of Wight Festival, "Smile" by Lily Allen.
- During the second show in New York, as well as shows in Atlanta, MITA Festival in Rio de Janeiro and São Paulo, Tokyo, Dublin, We The Fest in Jakarta, and Very Summer Fest in Bangkok, "The Sweet Escape" by Gwen Stefani.

== Tour dates ==
List of 2022 concerts
Date	City	Country	Venue	Opening act
September 29, 2022	Atlanta	United States	Center Stage	Girlhouse
October 1, 2022	Baltimore	United States	Rams Head Live!	Girlhouse
October 2, 2022	Philadelphia	United States	Theatre of Living Arts	Girlhouse
October 3, 2022	Boston	United States	Big Night Live	Girlhouse
October 5, 2022	New York City	United States	Webster Hall	Girlhouse
October 6, 2022	New York City	United States	Webster Hall	Girlhouse
October 7, 2022	Washington, D.C.	United States	Lincoln Theatre	Girlhouse
October 9, 2022	Chicago	United States	House of Blues Chicago	Girlhouse
October 10, 2022	Toronto	Canada	Phoenix Concert Theatre	Girlhouse
October 12, 2022	Tempe	United States	Marquee Theatre	Girlhouse
October 13, 2022	San Diego	United States	Observatory North Park	Girlhouse
October 15, 2022	Los Angeles	United States	Wiltern Theatre	Girlhouse
October 16, 2022	San Francisco	United States	Regency Center	Girlhouse
October 20, 2022 (Note: Originally scheduled for September 28, 2022, but it was rescheduled due to Hurricane Ian.)	Orlando	United States	Hard Rock Live	Girlhouse

List of 2023 concerts
Date	City	Country	Venue	Opening act
March 16, 2023	Hollywood	United States	Hard Rock Live Seminole	Spill Tab
March 17, 2023	St. Petersburg	United States	Jannus Live	Spill Tab
March 20, 2023	New Orleans	United States	Orpheum Theater	Spill Tab
March 22, 2023	Houston	United States	Warehouse Live	Spill Tab
March 24, 2023	Dallas	United States	The Factory in Deep Ellum	Spill Tab
March 25, 2023	San Antonio	United States	The Espee	Spill Tab
March 26, 2023	Austin	United States	Moody Theater	Spill Tab
March 28, 2023	Tulsa	United States	Tulsa Theater	Spill Tab
March 30, 2023	Denver	United States	Mission Ballroom	Spill Tab
April 1, 2023	Salt Lake City	United States	The Union	Spill Tab
April 2, 2023	Garden City	United States	Revolution Concert House	Spill Tab
April 5, 2023	Calgary	Canada	Grey Eagle Event Centre	Spill Tab
April 6, 2023 (Note: The venue for this show was upgraded from Union Hall following high demand.)	Edmonton	Canada	Edmonton Convention Centre	Spill Tab
April 8, 2023	Vancouver	Canada	PNE Forum	Spill Tab
April 11, 2023 (Note: The venue for this show was upgraded from Showbox SoDo following high demand.)	Seattle	United States	Paramount Theatre	Spill Tab
April 14, 2023	San Francisco	United States	The Warfield	Spill Tab
April 15, 2023	San Francisco	United States	The Warfield	Spill Tab
April 16, 2023	Wheatland	United States	Hard Rock Live Sacramento	Spill Tab
April 19, 2023	San Diego	United States	Humphreys Concerts By the Bay	Spill Tab
April 20, 2023	Los Angeles	United States	Greek Theatre	Spill Tab; Blu DeTiger
April 22, 2023	Las Vegas	United States	The Theater at Virgin Hotels	Blu DeTiger
April 23, 2023	Mesa	United States	Mesa Amphitheatre	Blu DeTiger
April 26, 2023	Kansas City	United States	Midland Theatre	Blu DeTiger
April 27, 2023 (Note: The venue for this show was upgraded from The Fillmore Minneapolis following high demand.)	Minneapolis	United States	State Theatre	Blu DeTiger
April 28, 2023	Madison	United States	The Sylvee	Blu DeTiger
April 30, 2023	Chesterfield	United States	The Factory	Blu DeTiger
May 2, 2023	Nashville	United States	Ryman Auditorium	Blu DeTiger
May 3, 2023 (Note: Originally scheduled on May 1, 2023.)	Indianapolis	United States	Murat Theatre	Blu DeTiger
May 5, 2023	Toronto	Canada	Meridian Hall	Blu DeTiger
May 6, 2023 (Note: The venue for this show was upgraded from Royal Oak Music Theatre following high demand.)	Detroit	United States	Masonic Temple Theatre	Blu DeTiger
May 7, 2023	Cleveland	United States	Agora Ballroom	Blu DeTiger
May 9, 2023	Boston	United States	Roadrunner	Blu DeTiger
May 10, 2023	New York City	United States	Terminal 5	Blu DeTiger
May 11, 2023	New York City	United States	Terminal 5	Blu DeTiger
May 13, 2023	Philadelphia	United States	Franklin Music Hall	Blu DeTiger
May 14, 2023	Washington, D.C.	United States	The Anthem	Blu DeTiger
May 16, 2023	Raleigh	United States	The Ritz	Blu DeTiger
May 17, 2023	Atlanta	United States	The Eastern	Blu DeTiger
May 20, 2023 (Note: Part of Hangout Music Festival.)	Gulf Shores	United States	Gulf Shores Public Beach	—N/a
May 28, 2023 (Note: Part of MITA Festival.)	Rio de Janeiro	Brazil	Jockey Club	—N/a
June 4, 2023	São Paulo	Brazil	Anhangabaú River	—N/a
June 11, 2023	Dublin	Ireland	3Olympia Theatre	Annika Bennett
June 13, 2023 (Note: The venue for this show was upgraded from SWG3 Galvanizers following high demand.)	Glasgow	Scotland	Barrowland Ballroom	Annika Bennett
June 14, 2023 (Note: The venue for this show was upgraded from O_{2} Ritz following high demand.)	Manchester	England	O_{2} Apollo Manchester	Annika Bennett
June 16, 2023 (Note: Part of Isle of Wight Festival.)	Newport	England	Seaclose Park	—N/a
June 18, 2023 (Note: The venue for this show was upgraded from O_{2} Institute following high demand, and the show was rescheduled from June 17, 2023.)	Birmingham	England	O_{2} Academy Birmingham	Annika Bennett
June 19, 2023	London	England	Eventim Apollo	Annika Bennett
June 23, 2023 (Note: The venue for this show was upgraded from La Madeleine following high demand.)	Brussels	Belgium	Palais 12	Annika Bennett
June 24, 2023 (Note: The venue for this show was upgraded from Live Music Hall following high demand.)	Cologne	Germany	Palladium	Annika Bennett
June 25, 2023	Amsterdam	Netherlands	Melkweg	Annika Bennett
June 27, 2023	Berlin	Germany	Astra Kulturhaus	Annika Bennett
June 29, 2023 (Note: Part of Lollapalooza Stockholm.)	Stockholm	Sweden	Gärdet	—N/a
July 2, 2023 (Note: Part of BST Hyde Park.)	London	England	Hyde Park	—N/a
July 3, 2023 (Note: The show was originally set to take place on June 21, 2023, at Élysée Montmartre, but it was later postponed, and the venue was upgraded.)	Paris	France	Zénith Paris	Annika Bennett
July 18, 2023	Tokyo	Japan	Toyosu PIT	—N/a
July 19, 2023	Osaka	Japan	Zepp Osaka Bayside	—N/a
July 21, 2023 (Note: Part of Good Vibes Festival.)	Kuala Lumpur	Malaysia	Sepang International Circuit	—N/a
July 22, 2023 (Note: Part of We The Fest.)	Jakarta	Indonesia	Gelora Bung Karno Sports Complex	—N/a
July 25, 2023	Quezon City	Philippines	New Frontier Theater	—N/a
July 27, 2023	Singapore		Sands Expo & Convention Centre	—N/a
July 29, 2023 (Note: Part of Very Summer Fest.)	Bangkok	Thailand	Bitec Hall	—N/a
August 3, 2023 (Note: Part of Lollapalooza Aftershow.)	Chicago	United States	House of Blues Chicago	—N/a
August 4, 2023 (Note: Part of Lollapalooza.)	Chicago	United States	Grant Park	—N/a
