= A Nonsense Christmas with Sabrina Carpenter =

2024 Christmas special

- Genre: Christmas special
- Written by: Megan Amram; Jimmy Fowlie; Fran Gillespie
- Directed by: Sam Wrench
- Starring: Sabrina Carpenter

Production
- Executive producers: Sabrina Carpenter; Michael D. Ratner; Scott Ratner; Simone Spire; Kfir Goldberg; Sarah Carpenter; Bill Perlman; Janelle Lopez Genzink; Nikki Boella Lieb
- Production companies: OBB Pictures; At Last Productions

Original release
- Network: Netflix
- Release: December 6, 2024

A Nonsense Christmas with Sabrina Carpenter is a Christmas special starring Sabrina Carpenter that premiered on December 6, 2024, on Netflix. It was directed by Sam Wrench and executive-produced by Carpenter, Michael D. Ratner, Scott Ratner, Simone Spire, Kfir Goldberg, Sarah Carpenter, Bill Perlman, Janelle Lopez Genzink, and Nikki Boella Lieb.

The special features musical guest stars including Shania Twain, Chappell Roan, Tyla, and Kali Uchis, all performing duets with Carpenter. It also features guest appearances from Cara Delevingne, Nico Hiraga, Quinta Brunson, Jillian Bell, Kyle Mooney, Megan Stalter, Owen Thiele, as well as Sean Astin as Santa Claus. The special received positive reviews.

== Synopsis ==
The film begins with Carpenter walking onstage to sing "Buy Me Presents" on a multiple-tiered stage resembling a birthday cake. After the performance, Carpenter sings "It's the Most Nonsense Time of the Year" — "It's the Most Wonderful Time of the Year" with alternate lyrics — while walking backstage.

Carpenter and Tyla then duet to "This Christmas" in the living room. Afterward, Carpenter sings "Santa Doesn't Know You Like I Do" solo onstage, while videos of her opening Christmas presents in 2002 play in the background.

Next, Carpenter is shown in the living room with two friends, played by Owen Thiele and Megan Stalter. Carpenter tells them about her new boyfriend, who then appears and Thiele and Stalter recognize as Santa Claus (Sean Astin). However, Carpenter sincerely denies this, adding that he is "good in bed". When Thiele and Stalter persist with their argument, Carpenter says that if he were really Santa Claus, he would know that all she had ever wanted since she was a child was to sing a duet with Shania Twain. At that moment, Twain arrives, but is revealed to be Mrs. Claus. She and Twain then sing "Santa Baby" onstage together. Thiele then proposes alternate lyrics to Carpenter's song "Nonsense", which are considerably cheesy. Carpenter tries to be polite, but is visibly opposed to the proposed lyrics.

The following scene shows Carpenter back in the living room, surrounded by family members, including Sabrina's sister Amy (Jillian Bell) and brother-in-law Dave (Kyle Mooney). Carpenter sings "What Do I Get My Brother-In-Law" while hopelessly trying to figure out a gift to give Dave. In the next scene, Carpenter and Kali Uchis sing "I Saw Mommy Kissing Santa Claus" in front of the living room fireplace.

Next, Ebby Scrooge (Nico Hiraga) falls asleep on the living room couch and is haunted by the Spirit of Ghosted Past (Carpenter), who chastises him for ghosting her. The Spirit of Ghosted Present (Quinta Brunson) appears next to her and angrily asks why Scrooge disappeared instead of taking her to see Wicked in the theater like he promised. Then the Spirit of Ghosted Future (Cara Delevingne) appears and begins to fall for Scrooge. However, the other two ghosts warn her that he will ghost her should they begin a relationship, persuading her to leave him alone. Before leaving, Delevingne proposes alternate lyrics to "Nonsense", which are considerably better than Thiele's.

Carpenter and Chappell Roan sing karaoke to "Last Christmas" in the living room. Carpenter then sings "Cindy Lou Who" on the piano. Before ending the film, Carpenter returns to the birthday cake stage, now with a staircase in the middle, and performs "A Nonsense Christmas".

== Musical numbers ==
1. "Buy Me Presents" (performed by Sabrina Carpenter)
2. "It's the Most Nonsense Time of the Year" (performed by Sabrina Carpenter)
3. "This Christmas" (performed by Sabrina Carpenter and Tyla)
4. "Santa Doesn't Know You Like I Do" (performed by Sabrina Carpenter)
5. "Santa Baby" (performed by Sabrina Carpenter and Shania Twain)
6. "What Do I Get My Brother-In-Law?" (performed by Sabrina Carpenter)
7. "I Saw Mommy Kissing Santa Claus" (performed by Sabrina Carpenter and Kali Uchis)
8. "Last Christmas" (performed by Sabrina Carpenter and Chappell Roan)
9. "Cindy Lou Who" (performed by Sabrina Carpenter)
10. "A Nonsense Christmas" (performed by Sabrina Carpenter)

== Cast ==
In order of appearance:

- Sabrina Carpenter as Herself / Deb / Spirit of Ghosted Past
- Tyla as Herself
- Owen Thiele as Sabrina's friend
- Megan Stalter as Sabrina's friend
- Sean Astin as Santa Claus
- Shania Twain as Mrs. Claus / Herself
- Kyle Mooney as Dave
- Jillian Bell as Amy
- Kali Uchis as Herself
- Nico Hiraga as Ebby Scrooge
- Quinta Brunson as the Spirit of Ghosted Present / Allie
- Cara Delevingne as the Spirit of Ghosted Future / Bri
- Chappell Roan as Herself

== Production and broadcast ==
American singer Sabrina Carpenter released her first Christmas-themed EP Fruitcake (2023) featuring a remix to her 2022 single "Nonsense" retitled "A Nonsense Christmas". The special was first teased on Carpenter's social media where it was announced with a video. It was also announced that the special would feature special guests, "comedic guests and unexpected cameos".

The special was released through Netflix and premiered on December 6, 2024.

== Reception ==
=== Audience viewership ===
TheWrap reported that A Nonsense Christmas with Sabrina Carpenter amassed 2.6 million views between its debut day and December 8, 2024. The special also ranked as Netflix’s No. 8 most-watched TV program during the week of December 1, 2024.

=== Critical reception ===
On the review aggregator website Rotten Tomatoes, 100% of seven critics' reviews are positive, with an average rating of 6.8/10. Other sites gave the film generally positive reviews: Layla Brown-Clark of the Chicago Reader wrote, "[The film] does not shy away from but leans into the nonsensical nature of such specials while interweaving skits and notable musical performances, all with the flair and cheekiness Carpenter has further stepped into in her Short n’ Sweet era," while Bianca Betancourt of Harper's Bazaar stated, "experiencing A Nonsense Christmas with a mug of mulled wine on the couch strikes me as maybe the next best thing. It serves as a reminder that Christmas can be all the things at once: chaotic, sexy, ridiculous, and, most importantly, special. Maybe embracing the camp of Christmastime is what we all really need this year."
