= Emails I Can't Send =

2022 studio album by Sabrina Carpenter

- Standard cover

Studio album by Sabrina Carpenter
- Released: July 15, 2022
- Recorded: 2019–2022
- Genres: Pop; folk-pop
- Length: 39:14
- Label: Island
- Producers: Julian Bunetta; Leroy Clampitt; Jason Evigan; Ryan Marrone; Jorgen Odegard; John Ryan

Sabrina Carpenter chronology
| Singular: Act II (2019) | Emails I Can't Send (2022) | Fruitcake (2023) |

Singles from Emails I Can't Send
- 1. "Skinny Dipping" Released: September 9, 2021; 2. "Fast Times" Released: February 18, 2022; 3. "Vicious" Released: July 1, 2022; 4. "Because I Liked a Boy" Released: July 15, 2022; 5. "Nonsense" Released: November 14, 2022

Singles from Emails I Can't Send Fwd:
- 1. "Feather" Released: August 4, 2023

Emails I Can't Send (stylized in all lowercase) is the fifth studio album by American singer Sabrina Carpenter. It was released on July 15, 2022, through Island Records. It is primarily a pop and folk-pop record with elements of alternative pop, bedroom pop, electropop, storytelling, and synth-pop. The album is themed around emails and messages she intended to send to others, but instead kept private.

The album was accompanied by five singles – "Skinny Dipping", "Fast Times", "Vicious", "Because I Liked a Boy" and "Nonsense". To promote the album, Carpenter embarked on the Emails I Can't Send Tour in September 2022. A deluxe edition, Emails I Can't Send Fwd:, was released in 2023, and included the single "Feather". The album charted within the top 30 in Argentina, Australia, Ireland, the Netherlands, New Zealand, and the United States. It received generally favorable reviews from music critics and ranked on Rolling Stone and Billboard lists of the best albums of 2022.

== Background ==
In June 2019, while promoting her fourth studio album Singular: Act II, Carpenter revealed to Marie Claire magazine that she had begun work on a fifth studio album. In 2020, she released the stand-alone single "Honeymoon Fades" and lent her vocals for the Clouds soundtrack.

In January 2021, after four albums with Hollywood Records, it was reported that Carpenter had signed to Island Records. She noted that it was "the perfect place for [her] to start the next chapter of [her] music career and evolution as an artist". Her first release came at the end of the month with "Skin".

In September that year, Carpenter reported to Teen Vogue that many of the album's songs were written from emails she wrote to herself, such as a song she had previously shared on August 7 with the description as "Intro", later revealed as the title track of the album. She also revealed that she finished the album's recording in New York City with Julia Michaels, JP Saxe, John Ryan and Leroy Clampitt, after she moved to Manhattan's Financial District in June of that year.

== Release ==
Carpenter appeared on The Tonight Show Starring Jimmy Fallon where she confirmed that the album would be released in 2022 and that the title was hidden in work released the year before. The album's name clue was in the music video for "Skinny Dipping" in a shot where the name appears in a Scrabble game.

The album was released on July 15, 2022. On March 17, 2023, Carpenter released a deluxe edition of the album.

== Composition ==
=== Genres and themes ===
Emails I Can't Send is primarily a pop and folk-pop record with elements of alternative pop, bedroom pop, electropop, storytelling, and synth-pop. The album also uses piano ballads and light-guitar instrumentals to showcase a sound where Carpenter benefited from less instrumentation. Some critics found the album was reminiscent to Carpenter's previous albums but "with fresher feelings and a closeness to the audience that did not feel as airy-fairy as before". The Strand Magazine writer Siraaj Khan agreed that the album differed from Carpenter's previous work which fell more into the contemporary R&B genre. Variety writer Julia MacCary also found that the album marked a departure from Carpenter's "previous four pop-heavy albums, experimenting with new genres, slower songs and using personal emails for lyrics". On the album, Carpenter noted:

For me, [it] was really a time capsule of a special time in my life when I dealt with many things for the first time. I feel like I came out of that with a much greater perspective, and all these songs are based on real nights or experiences and reflecting and foreshadowing.

The album was described as a "break-up album" and an "unapologetic collection of her inner thoughts, with a sense of heartache over unrequited love present throughout". Julianna Rezza of The Mud Mag called the album a "compilation of delicately told stories and new sounds".

=== Music and lyrics ===
The album begins with the title track intro which was inspired by a strained family relationship. The song deals with "trust, disappointment and infidelity". The end of the intro references the 1975 musical Chicago and smoothly transitions into "Vicious" which has a guitar-driven beat and ends in a "rock-esque vibe". "Read Your Mind" was described as a dance-pop "jump-up-and-down and dance-through-the-house" song in which Carpenter sings about the lack of communication between her and a partner. This is followed by "Tornado Warnings" which was described as a poem where Carpenter chooses to ignore her significant other's red flags. Young Hollywood writer Skylar Zachian noted that "the lyrics reveal a perfect balance of literal and metaphorical storytelling to really get us thinking about the intricacies of relationships and decision-making".

"Because I Liked a Boy" is about Carpenter's efforts to navigate public scrutiny. "Introspective, ironic, and quick-witted lyrics" are used throughout the song. Carpenter called the song "therapeutic" noting that the "song came from a really real place in [her] life". This is followed by "Already Over" and "How Many Things" which marked the end of the record's first half. The former was compared to Dolly Parton and Kacey Musgraves's work, with Carpenter singing about "the fragility of a relationship that should have ended long ago". The opening line of "How Many Things": "You used a fork once / It turns out forks are fucking everywhere" sparked a Twitter meme among Carpenter's fans.

"Bet U Wanna" has a "subdued but tense arrangement that complements its hushed vocals" and received comparisons to Carpenter's Singular era. With "dreamy instrumentals and sultry vocals", the song was named a stand-out on the album. This is followed by "Nonsense" who some felt it was Ariana Grande-inspired and "captures the feeling of liking someone so much that you completely lose your cool". The song uses "sexual innuendos, catchy soundscapes, and raspy-to-silky smooth vocals that attest to the [Carpenter's] extreme versatility". "Fast Times" is a soft rock and "slinky bossa nova track" about being "impulsive and embracing the 'fast times and fast nights' of youth". "Skinny Dipping" takes a "detour from the radio-friendly songwriting" and uses spoken words in its verses, which "resembles an awkward encounter with an ex-partner, which further adds to the project's conceptual undertone". Carpenter's vocals were described as "ethereal" and used "jazzy instrumentals to add to the song's innocent, carefree feel".

"Bad for Business" was described as "happy, romantic, and wistful" and embodies one of the most dangerous aspects of love: fixation. The album ends with "Decode" which was described as a "sombre but hopeful conclusion" to the album where "Carpenter shines as a songwriter". The song's heartwarming ambience is "produced by string instruments" and is about "overanalysing a relationship to the point where it's more detrimental than helpful".

The deluxe version of the album opens with "Opposite", which sees Carpenter looking back on a relationship, "wondering if she was never her ex's ideal type in the first place". This is followed by the upbeat "Feather", which was described as a break-up anthem. "Lonesome" is a Western-vibed song and was called "somber" and had "a kind of raw and stripped tune". The deluxe version ends with "Things I Wish You Said" which ends on a "reflective and nostalgic note".

== Promotion ==
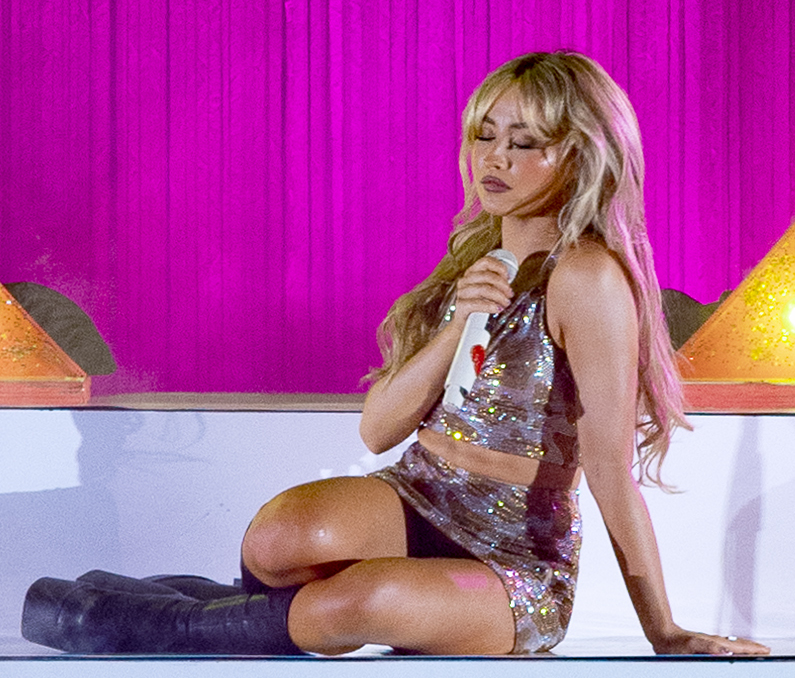
Carpenter performing at the Emails I Can't Send Tour in 2022

On August 15, 2022, Carpenter announced that she would embark on her fourth concert tour in support of Emails I Can't Send. The first leg of the tour began on September 29, 2022, in Atlanta, Georgia and concluded on October 20, 2022, in Orlando, Florida. On December 12, 2022, Carpenter announced a second North American leg of the tour for the spring of 2023. South America, Europe, and Asia dates followed. Carpenter also served as an opener for Taylor Swift at The Eras Tour where she performed several songs off the album.

=== Singles and music videos ===
"Skinny Dipping" was released as the album's lead single on September 9, 2021. Carpenter performed the song on The Tonight Show Starring Jimmy Fallon. A music video was released upon the song's release and featured Carpenter writing letters to herself, putting them in a box labeled "this too shall pass" and after dancing barefoot in a green dress on the streets of New York City, she throws the letters into the air.

"Fast Times" was released as the album's second single on February 18, 2022. It was released alongside a music video which acted a sequel to the video for "Skinny Dipping". The video was inspired by Charlie's Angels.

"Vicious" was released as the third single on July 1, 2022, along with the album's pre-order. The song reached 26 in New Zealand. Upon the album's release, Carpenter performed the song alongside others from the album at Samsung and Billboard's Summer of Galaxy annual event.

"Because I Liked a Boy" was issued as the album's fourth single concurrently with the album release, along with its music video. The video showcased Carpenter channeling "old Hollywood glamour aesthetic" and drew comparisons to Christina Aguilera's "Hurt" music video. Carpenter performed the song on The Late Late Show with James Corden.

"Nonsense" was released as the album's fifth single on November 14, 2022, alongside a music video. Before its release, Carpenter performed the song on her Emails I Can't Send Tour with a new alternate ending of the song every night which went viral on TikTok. The song received critical acclaim, reaching 56 on the Billboard Hot 100 and 32 on the UK Singles Chart. Carpenter also performed the song on Jimmy Kimmel Live! A remix featuring Coi Leray was released alongside a sped-version and a Christmas remix.

After the release of the deluxe edition, a music video for "Feather" was released on October 31, 2023. Carpenter performed the song and "Nonsense" at the pre-show of the 2023 MTV Video Music Awards. The video received polarised reviews for its depiction of Carpenter at the Blessed Virgin Mary Church in Brooklyn with Bishop Robert Brennan stating that the "parish did not follow diocesan policy regarding the filming on church property".

== Critical reception ==
Professional ratings
Review scores
| Source | Rating |
|---|---|
| AllMusic | 4/5 stars |
| RedBrick | 9/10 |
| SoundX | 7.2/10 stars |

The album generally received favourable reviews from music critics. Capital writer Savannah Roberts noted that the "songstress showed her impressive range on the record, including everything from ballads to insanely catchy empowerment anthems" and called it her most personal album, adding that it "gave fans an intimate look into Sabrina's life". Liam Hess of Vogue stated that the album is "the most fully realized vision of Carpenter the musician—and the most rounded portrait of Carpenter the human being—yet." The Edge writer Rhianna Saglani praised JP Saxe and Carpenter's collaborations and went on to call the album "a piece of art in itself". The Central Trend writer Ella Peirce called the album remarkable and noted that "each song is its own while still letting the record flow wonderfully together as a whole".

Agnius Kazlauskas of The Indiependent praised the album calling it "a story of Carpenter's perseverance and a much-needed step towards reclaiming her narrative". She added that the album "takes on the role of reintroducing the singer to the world" and called it an "emotional roller-coaster" which "[explores] the inner corners of Carpenter's mind". Village Pipol writer Indi Jimenez praised the album, calling it a "new perspective on the age-old question of how and why the way we love affects our relationships with others". She noted that while the "album itself doesn't deviate from the regular pop song formula", every song "is a refreshing twist and introduces a new vibe that is distinct and recognizable from other tracks". She praised Carpenter's songwriting noting that it "differentiates her from other artists in a distinct style that you can only pinpoint as Sabrina Carpenter".

In a mixed review, In Review Online writer Kayla Beardslee called the album "one of the best pop surprises of the year" but criticised its production choices. The Strand Magazine writer Siraaj Khan praised Carpenter's new direction for the album but felt that a few of the songs were not unique to Carpenter noting that "there is a big market for songs about teen heartbreak with the teenage girl crowd", calling it too "commercial". He concluded by saying that "once you look beyond the shiny artificial parts of the album, you find the authentic Sabrina Carpenter—which is far more appealing than whatever the lead singles hope to achieve".

=== Accolades ===
Select year-end rankings of Emails I Can't Send
| Publication | List | Rank | Ref. |
|---|---|---|---|
| Capital Buzz | The Best Albums of 2022 | 7 | |
| Billboard | The 50 Best Albums of 2022: Staff List | 19 | |
| Rolling Stone | The 100 Best Albums of 2022 | 44 | |

== Commercial performance ==
Emails I Can't Send debuted at number 23 on the US Billboard 200, earning 18,000 album-equivalent units, which included 7,000 pure album copies. The album entered the Canadian Albums Chart at number 55 and later peaked at number 32, and appeared on the ARIA Albums Chart debuting at number 44 and later peaking at number 27, marking her second and highest entry at the time.

The album also debuted at number 76 and later peaked at number 21 on the UK Albums Chart.

== Track listing ==
Standard edition
| No. | Title | Lyrics | Music | Producer(s) | Length |
|---|---|---|---|---|---|
| 1. | "Emails I Can't Send" | Sabrina Carpenter | Julia Michaels; JP Saxe | Leroy Clampitt | 1:44 |
| 2. | "Vicious" | Carpenter; Amy Allen | Jason Evigan | Evigan^{[a]} | 2:29 |
| 3. | "Read Your Mind" | Carpenter; Skyler Stonestreet | Clampitt | Clampitt | 3:27 |
| 4. | "Tornado Warnings" | Carpenter; Michaels | Saxe; Jorgen Odegard | Odegard | 3:24 |
| 5. | "Because I Liked a Boy" | Carpenter; Michaels | John Ryan; Michaels; Saxe | Ryan | 3:16 |
| 6. | "Already Over" | Carpenter; Michaels | Ryan; Michaels; Saxe | Ryan | 2:50 |
| 7. | "How Many Things" | Carpenter | Saxe; Ryan Marrone | Marrone | 4:03 |
| 8. | "Bet U Wanna" | Carpenter; Steph Jones | Julian Bunetta; Clampitt | Bunetta; Clampitt | 3:11 |
| 9. | "Nonsense" | Carpenter; Jones | Bunetta | Bunetta | 2:43 |
| 10. | "Fast Times" | Carpenter; Michaels | Ryan; Michaels; Saxe | Ryan | 2:54 |
| 11. | "Skinny Dipping" | Carpenter; Michaels | Clampitt; Michaels; Saxe | Clampitt | 2:57 |
| 12. | "Bad for Business" | Carpenter; Jones | Clampitt; Jones | Clampitt | 3:08 |
| 13. | "Decode" | Carpenter; Michaels | Ryan; Michaels; Saxe | Ryan | 3:08 |
| Total length: | | | | | 39:14 |

Fwd: edition
| No. | Title | Lyrics | Music | Producer(s) | Length |
|---|---|---|---|---|---|
| 14. | "Opposite" | Carpenter; Allen | Lostboy | Lostboy | 2:48 |
| 15. | "Feather" | Carpenter; Allen | Ryan | Ryan | 3:05 |
| 16. | "Lonesome" | Carpenter; Stonestreet | Clampitt | Clampitt | 3:07 |
| 17. | "Things I Wish You Said" | Carpenter; Jones | Clampitt | Clampitt | 2:42 |
| Total length: | | | | | 50:56 |

=== Notes ===
- ^{^[a]} signifies a producer and vocal producer
- "Emails I Can’t Send", "Because I Liked a Boy", "How Many Things", "Bet U Wanna", "Skinny Dipping", "Decode", "Opposite", and "Things I Wish You Said" are stylized in all lowercase.
- "Read Your Mind" is stylized as "Read your Mind".

== Personnel ==
Recorded, mixed and mastering

- Edgewater, New Jersey (Sterling Sound)
- Tarzana, California (Chumba Meadows)
- Los Angeles, California (Henson Recording Studios, Legacy Towers, cmd studios)
- New York City (Jungle City Studios)
- Virginia Beach, Virginia (MixStar Studios)
- Malibu, California (Woodshed Studios)
- Rhinebeck, New York (The Clubhouse)

Musicians

- Sabrina Carpenter – vocals (all tracks), backing vocals (6, 10)
- Crystal Alforque – violin (3)
- Julian Bunetta – programming (8, 9); bass, drums, keyboards, percussion (8)
- Leroy Clampitt – percussion, programming (3, 8, 11, 12), bass, guitar, drums (3, 11–12), percussion (3, 8, 11–12), keyboards (3, 8, 11); Mellotron, string arranging, synths (3); lap steel (12)
- Noah Conrad – trumpet (11)
- Jason Evigan – guitar, bass, programming, synthesizer (2)
- Peter Lee Johnson – strings (10)
- Steph Jones – backing vocals (8, 9)
- Julia Michaels – backing vocals (6)
- Forest Miller – strings (8)
- Jorgen Odegard – bass, drums, keyboards, percussion (4)
- Alida Garpestad Peck – backing vocals (11)
- John Ryan – programming (5, 6, 13), backing vocals (6, 10); bass, guitar, drums, percussion, keyboards (10)
- JP Saxe – keyboards (1), guitar (4, 7, 11), bass (4), backing vocals (6)
- Alex Sutton – guitar (4)
- Yi-Mei Templeman – cello (11)

Technical

- Bryce Bordone – mix engineer (5, 10)
- Julian Bunetta – recording (8–9)
- Leroy Clampitt – recording (1, 3, 8, 11, 12), mixing (1)
- Jason Evigan – recording (2)
- Chris Gehringer – mastering (1, 3, 4, 6, 7, 9–13)
- Serban Ghenea – mixing (5, 10)
- Josh Gudwin – mixing (2–4, 6–9, 11–13)
- Ryan Marrone – recording (7)
- Jorgen Odegard – recording (4)
- Will Quinnell – mastering (2, 5, 8)
- Jackson Rau – recording (2)
- John Ryan – recording (5, 6, 10, 13)
- Heidi Wang – mix engineer (2–4, 6–9, 12, 13)

== Charts ==
=== Weekly charts ===
Weekly chart performance for Emails I Can't Send
| Chart (2022–2025) | Peak position |
|---|---|
| Argentine Albums (CAPIF) | 9 |
| Australian Albums (ARIA) | 27 |
| Belgian Albums (Ultratop Flanders) | 8 |
| Belgian Albums (Ultratop Wallonia) | 73 |
| Canadian Albums (Billboard) | 32 |
| Dutch Albums (Album Top 100) | 6 |
| French Albums (SNEP) | 137 |
| German Albums (Offizielle Top 100) | 15 |
| German Pop Albums (Offizielle Top 100) | 7 |
| Irish Albums (Official Charts) | 22 |
| Japan Hot Albums (Billboard Japan) | 96 |
| New Zealand Albums (RMNZ) | 27 |
| Norwegian Albums (VG-lista) | 19 |
| Polish Albums (ZPAV) | 18 |
| Portuguese Albums (AFP) | 66 |
| Scottish Albums (Official Charts) | 5 |
| Spanish Albums (Promusicae) | 83 |
| Swedish Albums (Sverigetopplistan) | 53 |
| Swiss Albums (Schweizer Hitparade) | 68 |
| UK Albums (Official Charts) | 21 |
| US Billboard 200 | 23 |

=== Year-end charts ===
2024 year-end chart performance for Emails I Can't Send
| Chart (2024) | Position |
|---|---|
| Australian Albums (ARIA) | 50 |
| Belgian Albums (Ultratop Flanders) | 114 |
| Dutch Albums (Album Top 100) | 79 |
| UK Albums (OCC) | 84 |
| US Billboard 200 | 77 |

2025 year-end chart performance for Emails I Can't Send
| Chart (2025) | Position |
|---|---|
| Belgian Albums (Ultratop Flanders) | 101 |
| UK Albums (OCC) | 87 |
| US Billboard 200 | 153 |

== Certifications ==
Certifications for Emails I Can't Send
| Region | Certification | Certified units/sales |
|---|---|---|
| Australia (ARIA) | Gold | 35,000^{‡} |
| Brazil (Pro-Música Brasil) | Platinum | 40,000^{‡} |
| Brazil (Pro-Música Brasil) Deluxe version | Platinum | 40,000^{‡} |
| Canada (Music Canada) | 2× Platinum | 160,000^{‡} |
| Denmark (IFPI Danmark) | Gold | 10,000^{‡} |
| New Zealand (RMNZ) | 2× Platinum | 30,000^{‡} |
| United Kingdom (BPI) | Gold | 100,000^{‡} |
| United States (RIAA) | Platinum | 1,000,000^{‡} |
^{‡} Sales+streaming figures based on certification alone.

== Release history ==
Release history and formats for Emails I Can't Send
| Region | Date | Format(s) | Version | Label | Ref. |
|---|---|---|---|---|---|
| Various | July 15, 2022 | CD; digital download; streaming | Standard | Island | |
| United States | July 15, 2022 | CD (Target exclusive) | Standard | Island | |
| United States | December 12, 2022 | Vinyl LP | Standard | Island | |
| Various | March 17, 2023 | Digital download; streaming | Fwd | Island | |
| Japan | July 7, 2023 | CD | Fwd | Universal Japan | |
| Various | July 12, 2023 | Anniversary edition LP (Red) | Standard | Island | |
| United States | July 22, 2023 | Anniversary edition LP (Urban Outfitters exclusive light blue) | Standard | Island | |
| Various | August 29, 2025 | Vinyl LP | Fwd | Island | |
