= Fruitcake (Sabrina Carpenter EP) =

EP by Sabrina Carpenter
- Released: November 17, 2023
- Recorded: 2023
- Studios: Playpen (Calabasas); Perch (Calabasas); The Nest (Nashville)
- Genres: Christmas; pop
- Length: 15:46
- Label: Island
- Producers: Julian Bunetta; John Ryan

Sabrina Carpenter chronology
Emails I Can't Send (2022)	Fruitcake (2023)	Short n' Sweet (2024)

Fruitcake is the second extended play (EP) and first Christmas themed record by American singer Sabrina Carpenter. It was released by Island Records on November 17, 2023. It was produced by Julian Bunetta and John Ryan.

== Background and release ==
Prior to signing with Island Records in 2021, Carpenter released various Christmas songs including "Christmas the Whole Year Round" which reached number 17 on the US Holiday Digital Song Sales chart. On December 7, 2022, following her fifth studio album Emails I Can't Send, Carpenter released a Christmas remix of the track "Nonsense", titled "A Nonsense Christmas".

A year later, on November 8, 2023, Carpenter announced that she would be releasing her first Christmas-themed EP, and revealed its track list through a post on her social media accounts. The EP was released on November 17, 2023. On her website, the announcement followed the same aesthetic of her album Emails I Can't Send (2022), being presented in a designed email-style.

On November 11, 2025, she released four variants — Liquid Glitter, Fruit Punch, Olive/Apple Green & Milky Clear — which became available for pre-order the same day. The Liquid Glitter & Milky Clear editions released on December 12, 2025. The Olive/Apple Green & Fruit Punch were released on her store and in physical stores. A 4-inch vinyl featuring "Buy Me Presents" and "Santa Doesn't Know You Like I Do" was released on November 25, 2026.

== Music and lyrics ==
The EP begins with "A Nonsense Christmas", a holiday remix of her viral single "Nonsense". Throughout the song, Carpenter sings puns about Charles Dickens, Christmas Tree trimmings, and was described as "goofy and unserious". Carpenter also changed the lyrics to the song to match the Christmas-theme with lyrics "Sounds like bleh-blah-blee" changed to "Sounds like ho ho ho". Carpenter also recorded a new outro for the song. "Buy Me Presents" follows with similar Christmas-themed wordplay and was described as a "bright and bouncing tongue in cheek love song". The song features a saxophone-solo against a "smooth atmospheric production" and is reminiscent of a Hallmark movie soundtrack.

"Santa Doesn't Know You Like I Do" is a ballad and shifts the mood of the EP. Described as a sad love song, and featured a spoken word bridge which was described as a callback to Carpenter's 2022 single "Skinny Dipping". The production of the song was called a "juxtaposition between the snare kicks and gentle production" which works towards creating a sombre atmosphere. This is followed by "Cindy Lou Who" which is named after the How the Grinch Stole Christmas! character of the same name. The song tells the story of a heartbreak leading to the singer questioning her feelings about her ex-lover's new girlfriend.

Carpenter follows this with a pop-infused song "Is It New Years Yet?" where she wants to "skip past Christmas because everyone has a partner to spend" it with. The song was compared to "Dance the Night", and sings that "Fruitcake just makes [her] sick". The EP closes with a cover of Irving Berlin's "White Christmas" titled "White Xmas". Carpenter's vocals were called a highlight of the song, being described as an outro rather than a full-song. The song also interpolates "Jingle Bells".

== Commercial performance ==
In its original chart run upon release, Fruitcake debuted at number 198 on the Billboard 200 chart and later peaked at number 121. Following the release of Carpenter's holiday special A Nonsense Christmas with Sabrina Carpenter in December 2024, the EP grew 27,326% in album activity, earned 54,000 equivalent units with 39,000 pure copies sold (31,000 of which were vinyl sales) and reached a new peak of number 10 on the Billboard 200. It became the holiday release with the biggest week based on pure sales in four years since Carrie Underwood’s My Gift (2020).

== Critical reception ==
Professional ratings
Review scores
Source	Rating
AllMusic	3.5/5 stars

Upon release, the EP was well received by critics. Alex Hopper of American Songwriter complimented Carpenter for not relying exclusively on traditional Christmas songs and for writing original material. Amy Britton of The Indiependent wrote that the record is "a sugary sweet musical feast" and that, although it was full of the "usual Christmas song stereotypes", it kept the artist's essence.

Sabrina Carpenter's holiday music has earned significant recognition from various publications. Her song "A Nonsense Christmas" was ranked by Billboard as the 14th best Christmas song of the 21st century. Additionally, Cosmopolitan magazine ranked it 77th on their list of top Christmas songs. Carpenter's song, "Santa Doesn't Know You Like I Do," was ranked by Parade magazine as the 203rd best Christmas song of all time.

== Track listing ==
Fruitcake track listing
No.	Title	Writer(s)	Producer(s)	Length
1.	"A Nonsense Christmas"	Sabrina Carpenter; Julian Bunetta; Steph Jones	Bunetta; Dylan McDougle^{[v]}	2:33
2.	"Buy Me Presents"	Carpenter; Jones; John Ryan	Ryan	2:57
3.	"Santa Doesn't Know You Like I Do"	Carpenter; Bunetta; Amy Allen	Bunetta	3:09
4.	"Cindy Lou Who"	Carpenter; Ryan; Allen	Ryan	2:01
5.	"Is It New Years Yet?"	Carpenter; Ryan; Allen	Ryan	2:38
6.	"White Xmas"	Irving Berlin	Ryan	2:26
Total length:				15:46

=== Note ===
- ^{^[v]} signifies a vocal producer

== Personnel ==
Musicians

- Sabrina Carpenter – lead vocals
- Julian Bunetta – programming (tracks 1, 3), background vocals (1); bass, drums, keyboards, percussion (3)
- Steph Jones – background vocals (track 1)
- John Ryan – bass, guitar, keyboards, programming (tracks 2, 4–6); synthesizer (2, 4, 5), drums (2, 5, 6), percussion (5), organ (6)
- Leon Silva – saxophone (track 2)
- Rob Moose – viola, violin (tracks 4, 6)

Technical

- Nathan Dantzler – mastering
- Julian Bunetta – mixing, engineering (track 1)
- Rob Kinelski – mixing (tracks 2–6)
- Jeff Gunnell – engineering (tracks 2–5)
- Rob Moose – string arrangement (tracks 4, 6)
- Eli Heisler – mixing assistance (tracks 2–6)

== Charts ==
2023 chart performance for Fruitcake
Chart	Peak position
UK Album Downloads (Official Charts)	63
US Billboard 200	121
US Top Holiday Albums (Billboard)	19

2024—2025 chart performance for Fruitcake
Chart	Peak position
Australian Albums (ARIA)	14
Austrian Albums (Ö3 Austria)	17
Belgian Albums (Ultratop Flanders)	6
Belgian Albums (Ultratop Wallonia)	38
Canadian Albums (Billboard)	29
Croatian International Albums (HDU)	15
Dutch Albums (Album Top 100)	2
Finnish Albums (Suomen virallinen lista)	46
French Albums (SNEP)	66
German Albums (Offizielle Top 100)	20
Greek Albums (IFPI)	12
Irish Albums (Official Charts)	17
Japanese Hot Albums (Billboard Japan)	94
Lithuanian Albums (AGATA)	36
New Zealand Albums (RMNZ)	31
Norwegian Albums (VG-lista)	16
Portuguese Albums (AFP)	139
Scottish Albums (Official Charts)	2
Spanish Albums (Promusicae)	8
Swedish Albums (Sverigetopplistan)	40
UK Albums (Official Charts)	5
US Billboard 200	10
US Top Holiday Albums (Billboard)	3

== Release history ==
Release history and formats for Fruitcake
Region	Date	Format(s)	Label	Ref.
Various	November 17, 2023	Digital download; streaming; vinyl EP	Island	
Various	December 6, 2024	CD; cassette	Island	
