= Feather (song) =

2023 single by Sabrina Carpenter

- Single cover art

Single by Sabrina Carpenter

from the album Emails I Can't Send Fwd:
- Released: August 4, 2023
- Genre: Bubblegum; dance; dance-pop; disco-pop; neo-disco
- Length: 3:05
- Label: Island
- Songwriters: Sabrina Carpenter; Amy Allen; John Ryan
- Producer: John Ryan

Sabrina Carpenter singles chronology
"That's Not How This Works" (Sabrina's version) (2023)	"Feather" (2023)	"Cupid" (Twin version) (2023)

Music video
- "Feather" on YouTube

"Feather" is a song by American singer Sabrina Carpenter from Emails I Can't Send Fwd:, the 2023 reissue of her fifth studio album, Emails I Can't Send (2022). Carpenter wrote it with songwriter Amy Allen and producer John Ryan. Island Records released its sped-up version on August 4, 2023, and Republic Records promoted its original version to radio stations on September 12, 2023. A combination of pop, dance, disco, and bubblegum music, "Feather" is a post-breakup track which celebrates the freedom and relief one feels upon ending a relationship and shedding its weight.

Music critics praised the production of "Feather", describing it as light and airy. In the United States, the song peaked at number 21 on the Billboard Hot 100 and became Carpenter's first song to reach the top 40; it was also her first number 1 on the Pop Airplay chart. The song reached the top 20 in Honduras, Latvia, Malaysia, Singapore, and the United Kingdom. It received a diamond certification in Brazil and platinum or higher in Australia, Canada, New Zealand, the United Kingdom, and the United States.

Mia Barnes directed the horror-inspired music video for "Feather", which was released on Halloween in 2023. It depicts the deaths of several men who mistreat Carpenter, who then dances at their joint funeral in the Annunciation of the Blessed Virgin Mary Church. The video received a positive critical response but caused controversy when the Catholic Bishop of Brooklyn, Robert J. Brennan, issued a statement criticizing the church scenes and suspended the priest who allowed them to be filmed. Carpenter performed the song at the 2023 MTV Video Music Awards pre-show and at the 2023 Dick Clark's New Year's Rockin' Eve. She included it in her set list for the Emails I Can't Send, Eras, and Short n' Sweet tours.

== Background and release ==
Sabrina Carpenter signed a five-album contract with Hollywood Records at the age of 14. In the following years, she released several albums, which charted outside the top 25 on the American albums chart and did not produce any top 40 singles. In January 2021, Carpenter signed a deal with Island Records. She achieved her first Billboard Hot 100 chart entry with "Skin" (2021), perceived to be an answer song to Olivia Rodrigo's 2021 single "Drivers License" by critics. Carpenter pursued a more personal songwriting style on her first album with the label, Emails I Can't Send (2022), which was conceived during the COVID-19 lockdowns and inspired by emails she would write to herself. The album was released on July 15, 2022, and included the single "Nonsense", which reached number 56 on the Billboard Hot 100.

Shortly before embarking on the Emails I Can't Send Tour in September 2022, Carpenter recorded the song "Feather", which she wrote with Amy Allen and John Ryan. They conceived it within two hours while "just literally dancing around" according to Carpenter, as Ryan played "a cool, feathery thing" on a piano. It was included on the album's 2023 deluxe edition, Emails I Can't Send Fwd:, which she did not view as a follow-up to the original album but "just a few songs that belong in the Emails world" to thank her fans. Carpenter's manager thought the song would help extend the album campaign and aligned its release with the promotion for "Nonsense". Island released a sped-up version of "Feather" as a single on August 4, 2023, and included it on a 7-inch vinyl alongside the original version. Carpenter's manager wanted to employ a "traditional pop single campaign" and waited for the song to gain popularity following its music video's release before sending it for airplay. Carpenter also gained more recognition while serving as an opening act on Taylor Swift's 2023–2024 concert tour, the Eras Tour. Republic Records promoted the song to US radio on September 12, 2023, as reported by the trade magazine Hits.

== Composition ==
Critics identified "Feather" as a pop, dance, dance-pop, disco, bubblegum, neo-disco, and disco-pop song. The song lasts for three minutes and five seconds. Ryan produced, programmed, and engineered it. Chris Gehringer mastered "Feather" at Sterling Sound in New York City, and Josh Gudwin helmed mixing with assistance from Heidi Wang. Carpenter's vocals are delicate on the song, including during the titular lyric: "I feel so much lighter like a feather with you off my mind." Its "do-do-do" melody is reminiscent of Paula Cole's 1997 single "Where Have All the Cowboys Gone?", according to Rolling Stone India's Amit Vaidya.

"Feather" is a post-breakup song, which celebrates the freedom and relief one feels upon ending a relationship and shedding its weight. Carpenter begins by describing a toxic relationship characterized by immaturity and inconsistency, illustrating the dynamic where her partner initially seems thrilled but then becomes distant and uncommitted when she attempts to make plans. She resolves not to get entangled in a back-and-forth and decides to step away from him to unwind, and in the pre-chorus, expresses that she will block and ignore him in the future. Carpenter compares the lightness she feels upon leaving him to a feather. Reminiscing about their memories together, she refers to him as a "waste of time" who used to "act like a bitch".

== Reception ==
Music critics praised the production of "Feather", describing it as light and airy. Slate's Chris Molanphy described the song as "a neo-disco bop", and American Songwriter's Alex Hopper called it a "pop gem". Hopper further described Carpenter's vocals as those of a "pop-princess" and the chorus as light and digestible "pure pop fodder". He thought its melody was infectious and perfectly satisfied his craving for a danceable beat. Vaidya included "Feather" at number 57 in Rolling Stone India's list of the top songs of 2023 and believed it was tuneful, astutely personal, and sincere. Billboard's Madison E. Goldberg described it as "a masterclass in 2020s pop music".

"Feather" was Carpenter's first song to reach the top 40 on the Billboard Hot 100 and peaked at number 21 on the chart issued for April 27, 2024. The song also became her first to peak at number one on the Pop Airplay chart or any radio-focused Billboard chart. It received a 2× platinum certification from the Recording Industry Association of America. "Feather" charted at number 25 on the Canadian Hot 100 issued for April 20 and was certified quadruple platinum by Music Canada. The song reached number 19 on the UK Singles Chart and received a platinum certification from the British Phonographic Industry.

In Australia, "Feather" peaked at number 23 and was certified quadruple platinum by the Australian Recording Industry Association (ARIA). The song charted at number 40 in New Zealand and received a double platinum certification from Recorded Music NZ. It reached number 43 on the Billboard Global 200. "Feather" also peaked within the top 50 at number 14 in Honduras and Singapore, number 16 in Latvia, number 18 in Malaysia, number 25 in Ireland, number 26 in the Netherlands, and number 48 in the Philippines. The song received a diamond certification in Brazil and gold in Central America, Denmark, France, Poland, Portugal, Spain, and Sweden.

Critics have discussed the song's impact on Carpenter's success the following year. Kelsey Barnes of Grammy.com thought its performance showcased her bold style gaining traction and paved the way for "an even bigger 2024". (Note: Barnes mentioned Carpenter achieving the Billboard Hot 100 number one and number three singles "Please Please Please" and "Espresso", respectively, and performing at Coachella and Saturday Night Live as some of her achievements in 2024.) Goldberg listed "Feather" among Carpenter's 10 most essential songs and believed it laid the groundwork for her signature sound. Billboard's Jason Lipshutz thought the song's pop radio success was significant and helped her reach the biggest radio stations in the US.

== Music video ==
Mia Barnes directed the horror-inspired music video for "Feather", which features Milo Manheim as one of the male characters. Carpenter's stylist chose baby blue and baby pink outfits to convey femininity, fragility, and purity, which he thought would be humorous in contrast to the deaths in the video. Carpenter teased the horror theme by sharing a clip on Instagram on October 30, 2023. The video was released the following day to coincide with Halloween, and Carpenter shared behind-the-scenes photographs of her posing with castmates, showcasing her wardrobe, and others of her splattered with fake blood and in a crop top.

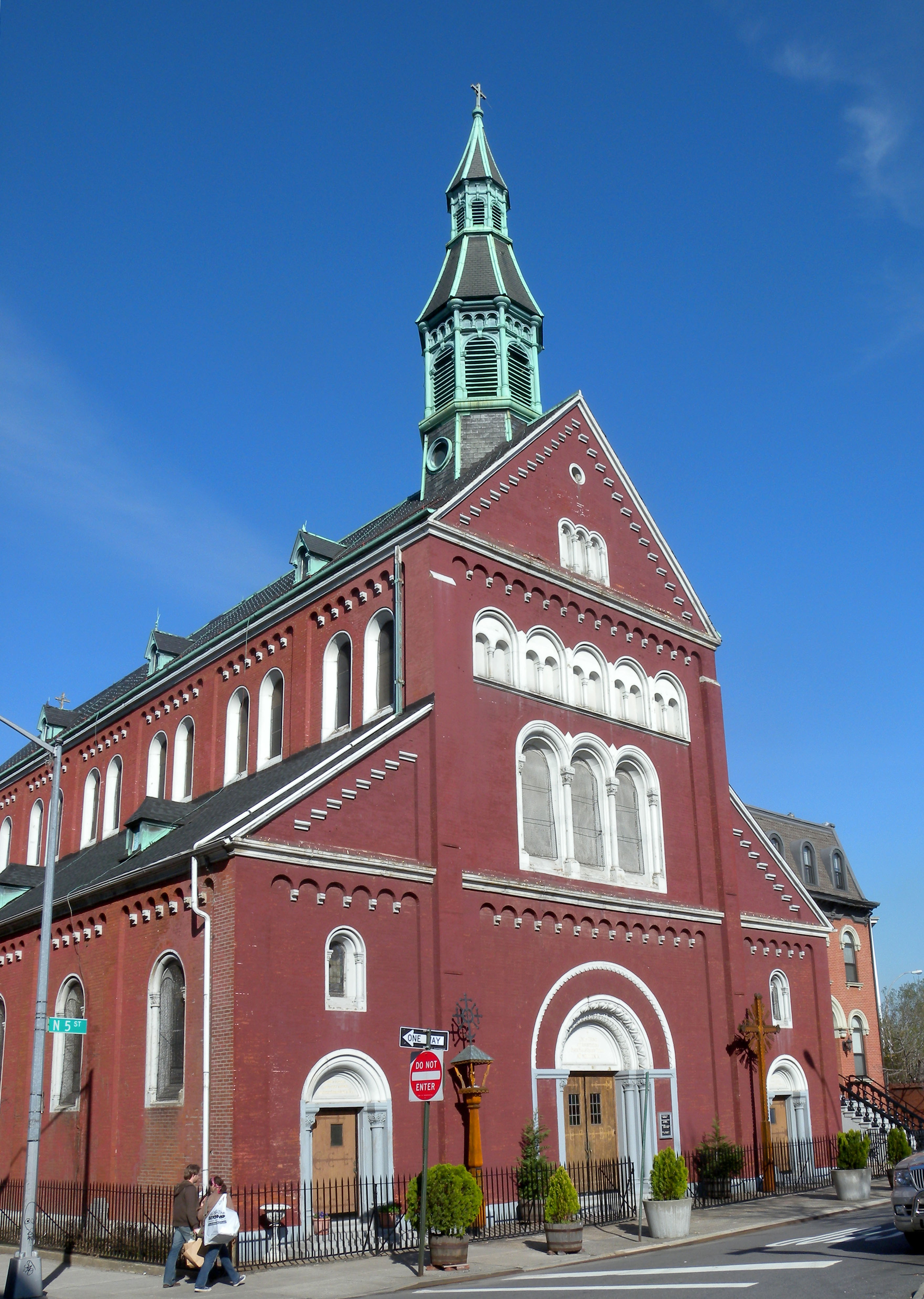
Scenes filmed inside the Annunciation of the Blessed Virgin Mary Church (left) caused controversy. The Catholic Bishop of Brooklyn stated that he was "appalled", and this led to a priest's suspension.

The video begins with shots of a pastel-colored coffin that reads "RIP bitch", neon crosses, and a gravestone etched with "He was just okay" inside the Annunciation of the Blessed Virgin Mary Church, following which Carpenter arrives outside in a bubblegum pink hearse. Three men reading a book titled Tampons Should Be Free follow and catcall her, before getting run over by a truck. Carpenter takes a boxing class in a gym while clad in stilettos and knee highs. Several men there fight each other, and she becomes covered in their blood. Another man (Manheim) non-consensually takes a photograph up Carpenter's skirt with the flash turned on while they are in an elevator together. She pulls his tie while exiting it and puts it between the elevator doors, decapitating him in the process. Carpenter is seen at the church during a joint funeral for the men who died over the course of the video. Wearing a short black tulle dress and veil, she dances in front of the coffins and several religious items at the altar, instead of mourning their deaths.

Critics found the video entertaining to watch on Halloween, and Lexi Lane of Uproxx thought it gave Carpenter's fans everything they could have desired. It received comparisons to several movies, including Jennifer's Body (2009), Promising Young Woman (2020), Bottoms (2023), and Final Destination (2000). Lane believed the church scenes recalled the 1996 film Romeo + Juliet. Vulture's Justin Curto called Carpenter's character "the Girlfriend Reaper".

=== Controversy ===
Two days after the video's release, Robert J. Brennan, the Catholic Bishop of Brooklyn, issued a statement that he was "appalled" by what was filmed inside the church. He indicated that the parish did not adhere to the policy on filming within church grounds, which requires a review of the scenes and script. The administrative duties of Monsignor Jamie J. Gigantiello in the diocese, the priest who gave Carpenter's team permission to shoot inside the church, were subsequently terminated. Despite still remaining in his role at the parish, some parishioners and churchgoers supported Gigantiello and believed the punishment was too harsh, while others were offended by his actions.

At first, Gigantiello defended his decision, stating that he had approved the filming because his online search about Carpenter did not reveal anything worrisome, and that he wanted to increase the church's appeal to youth. Gigantiello later apologized for allowing the shoot, stating that he was informed that a funeral scene would be filmed inside the church, but believed most of it would be done outside the church building and that Carpenter's team did not appropriately represent the video's content.

The church held a Mass of reparation on November 4, 2023, to "restore the sanctity of this church and repair the harm". Carpenter responded to the controversy by saying "we got approval in advance" and proclaiming that "Jesus was a carpenter." Writing for The A.V. Club, Emma Keates believed "the video rules" and the controversy contributed to Carpenter's "new, cool girl persona", also praising her response.

In September 2024, an investigation into Gigantiello uncovered evidence that led to the indictment of New York City mayor Eric Adams.

== Live performances and other usage ==
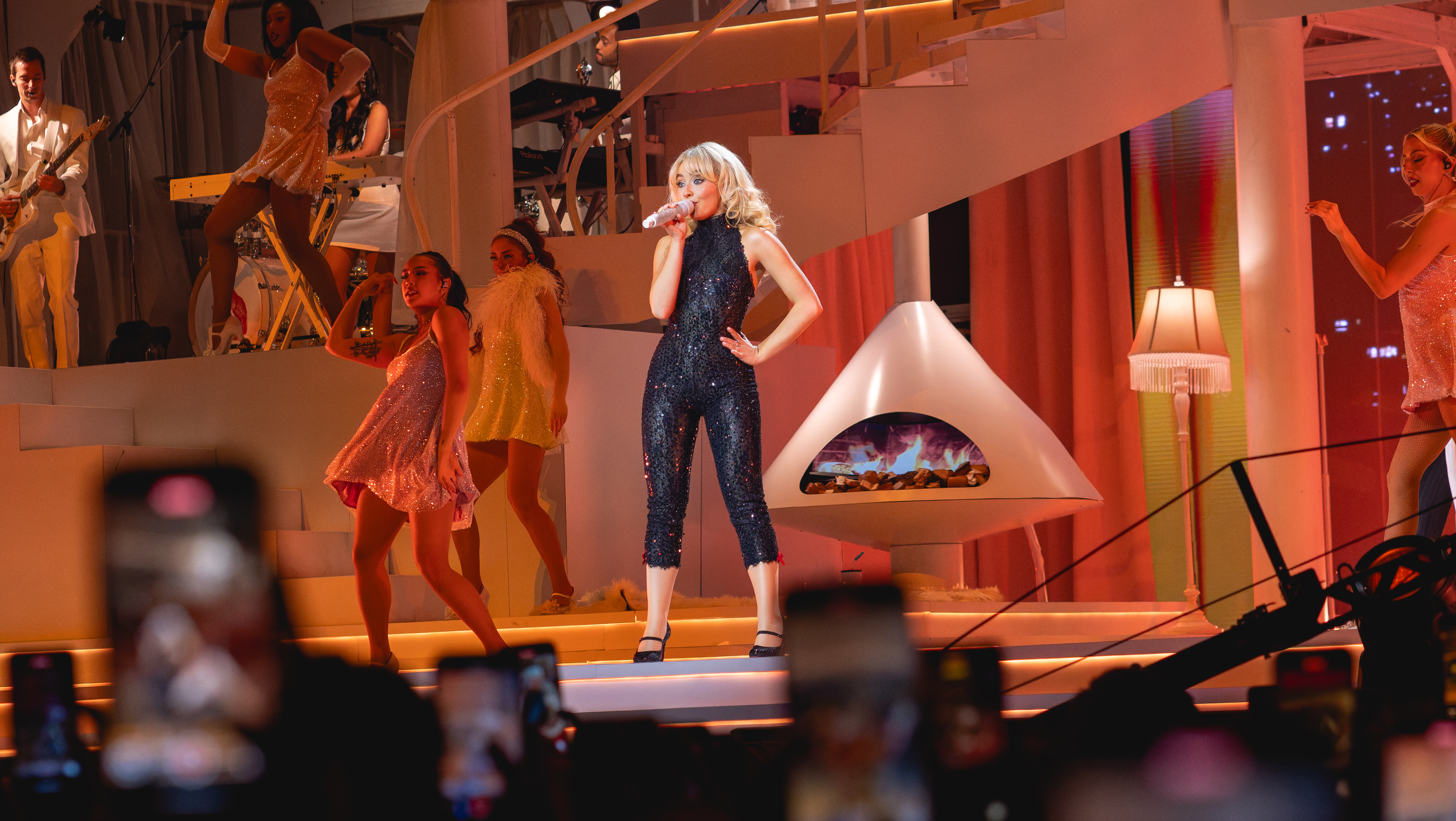
Carpenter performing "Feather" on the Short n' Sweet Tour in 2025

Carpenter performed "Feather" on the Emails I Can't Send Tour (2022–23) and while opening for Taylor Swift's The Eras Tour (2023–24). She reprised "Feather" and "Nonsense" at the 2023 MTV Video Music Awards pre-show on September 12, 2023. Carpenter began by singing "Feather" with a black-and-white retro theme before transitioning into the latter song; Hopper believed she delivered "heavenly" and impeccable vocals alongside a playful demeanor and outstanding choreography. The following month, Carpenter released a live version of "Feather" for the Spotify Singles series, which People's Jack Irvin believed was elevated but stayed true to the original song. She opened her KIIS-FM Jingle Ball sets with the song in December 2023, clad in a red mini-dress and gloves on one date and a white corset top, shorts, and gloves on another. Carpenter sang it at the 2023 Dick Clark's New Year's Rockin' Eve with male dancers in suits.

On May 18, 2024, Carpenter performed a mashup of "Feather" and "Nonsense" on Saturday Night Live in a rose gold jumpsuit decorated with feathers alongside background dancers dressed in white. She replaced the lyric "I'm so sorry for your loss" with "I'm on SNL and you're not." Uproxx's Alex Gonzalez described the performance as "angelic" and believed she dominated the stage but the dancers were equally energetic. Carpenter reprised "Feather" at Capital's Summertime Ball 2024 and at the Outside Lands festival on August 10, 2024. She included a jazz-influenced rendition of the song on the set list for the Short n' Sweet Tour (2024–2025).

Kelly Clarkson performed a cover of "Feather" on The Kelly Clarkson Show in February 2024 with backing vocals from the ensemble My Band Y'all. The group provided a four on the floor beat through guitar and bass instrumentation. Rolling Stone's Kory Grow thought Clarkson and the band successfully conveyed the "live" characteristic of the rendition.

== Credits and personnel ==
Credits are adapted from the single's 7" vinyl liner notes.

- Sabrina Carpenter – lead vocals, songwriting
- John Ryan – songwriting, production, recording, programming
- Amy Allen – songwriting
- Josh Gudwin – mixing
- Heidi Wang – mix engineer
- Chris Gehringer – mastering

== Charts ==
=== Weekly charts ===
Weekly chart performance for "Feather"
Chart (2023–2024)	Peak position
Australia (ARIA)	23
Canada Hot 100 (Billboard)	25
Canada AC (Billboard)	20
Canada CHR/Top 40 (Billboard)	2
Canada Hot AC (Billboard)	5
CIS Airplay (TopHit)	117
Global 200 (Billboard)	43
Honduras (Monitor Latino)	14
Ireland (IRMA)	25
Latvia Airplay (LaIPA)	16
Malaysia International (RIM)	18
Netherlands (Single Tip)	26
New Zealand (Recorded Music NZ)	40
Philippines Hot 100 (Billboard)	48
Portugal (AFP)	119
Singapore (RIAS)	14
UK Singles (Official Charts)	19
US Billboard Hot 100	21
US Adult Contemporary (Billboard)	15
US Adult Pop Airplay (Billboard)	4
US Dance Airplay (Billboard)	11
US Pop Airplay (Billboard)	1

=== Year-end charts ===
Year-end chart performance for "Feather"
Chart (2024)	Position
Australia (ARIA)	46
Canada (Canadian Hot 100)	42
Global 200 (Billboard)	81
Philippines (Philippines Hot 100)	62
UK Singles (OCC)	69
US Billboard Hot 100	25
US Adult Contemporary (Billboard)	32
US Adult Top 40 (Billboard)	15
US Mainstream Top 40 (Billboard)	9

== Certifications ==
Certifications for "Feather"
Region	Certification	Certified units/sales
Australia (ARIA)	4× Platinum	280,000^{‡}
Brazil (Pro-Música Brasil)	Diamond	160,000^{‡}
Canada (Music Canada)	4× Platinum	320,000^{‡}
Denmark (IFPI Danmark)	Gold	45,000^{‡}
France (SNEP)	Gold	100,000^{‡}
New Zealand (RMNZ)	2× Platinum	60,000^{‡}
Poland (ZPAV)	Gold	25,000^{‡}
Portugal (AFP)	Gold	5,000^{‡}
Spain (Promusicae)	Gold	30,000^{‡}
United Kingdom (BPI)	Platinum	600,000^{‡}
United States (RIAA)	2× Platinum	2,000,000^{‡}
Streaming
Central America (CFC)	Gold	3,500,000^{†}
Sweden (GLF)	Gold	6,000,000^{†}
^{‡} Sales+streaming figures based on certification alone.^{†} Streaming-only figures based on certification alone.

== Release history ==
Release date and format(s) for "Feather"
Region	Date	Format(s)	Version	Label	Ref.
Various	August 4, 2023	Digital download; streaming	Sped up	Island	
United States	September 12, 2023	Contemporary hit radio	Original	Island; Republic	
Various	October 31, 2023	7-inch	Original; sped up	Island	
Various	April 20, 2024	7-inch	Original; sped up	Island	
