= Fast Times (Sabrina Carpenter song) =

Single by Sabrina Carpenter

from the album Emails I Can't Send
- Released: February 18, 2022
- Recorded: Summer 2021
- Studio: Jungle City Studios (New York City)
- Genre: Pop; soft rock
- Length: 2:55
- Label: Island
- Songwriters: Sabrina Carpenter; John Ryan; Julia Michaels; JP Saxe
- Producer: John Ryan

Sabrina Carpenter singles chronology
"Skinny Dipping" (2021)	"Fast Times" (2022)	"Vicious" (2022)

Music video
- "Fast Times" on YouTube

"Fast Times" is a song recorded by American singer Sabrina Carpenter from her fifth studio album Emails I Can't Send (2022), included as the tenth track of the album. The track was written by Carpenter, Julia Michaels, JP Saxe and its producer John Ryan. The upbeat pop and soft rock song with bossa nova-tinged sounds was released by Island Records as the second single from the album on February 18, 2022. Lyrically, Carpenter sings of "running a relationship on fast-forward" and living in the present and not worrying about the consequences.

== Background and release ==
The song was written by Carpenter, Julia Michaels, JP Saxe and John Ryan in New York on Summer 2021. The first stage of the song's songwriting was sampling a Tequila bottle and playing percussion with pencils. The singer says "We weren't taking ourselves too seriously making it, which really reflects the energy of the song".

On January 1, Carpenter shared a snippet of the song's chorus, enticing new music. On The Tonight Show Starring Jimmy Fallon, Carpenter revealed the song's name. On February 3, Carpenter finally revealed the single's cover art and release date. The song was released on February 18, along with its music video.

== Composition and lyrical interpretation ==
Musically, "Fast Times" is a two minutes and fifty-five seconds pop and soft rock song with bossa nova-tinged sounds. In terms of music notation, "Fast Times" was composed using 4/4 common time in the key of C♯ minor, with the verses composed in D major, with a moderately fast tempo of 133 beats per minute. The song follows the chord progression of Em-Em6-Em7-Em6 on the verses and C♯m-B6-Amaj7-B6/A on the chorus. Carpenter's vocal range spans from the low note of G_{3} to the high note of A_{4}, giving the song one octave and one note of range. Productionwise, the song features "post-disco violins" and a "funky electric guitar solo" on the bridge.

== Music video ==
The official music video was released along with the song and was directed by Amber Park. The action music video is inspired by Charlie's Angels and Kill Bill.

== Live performances ==
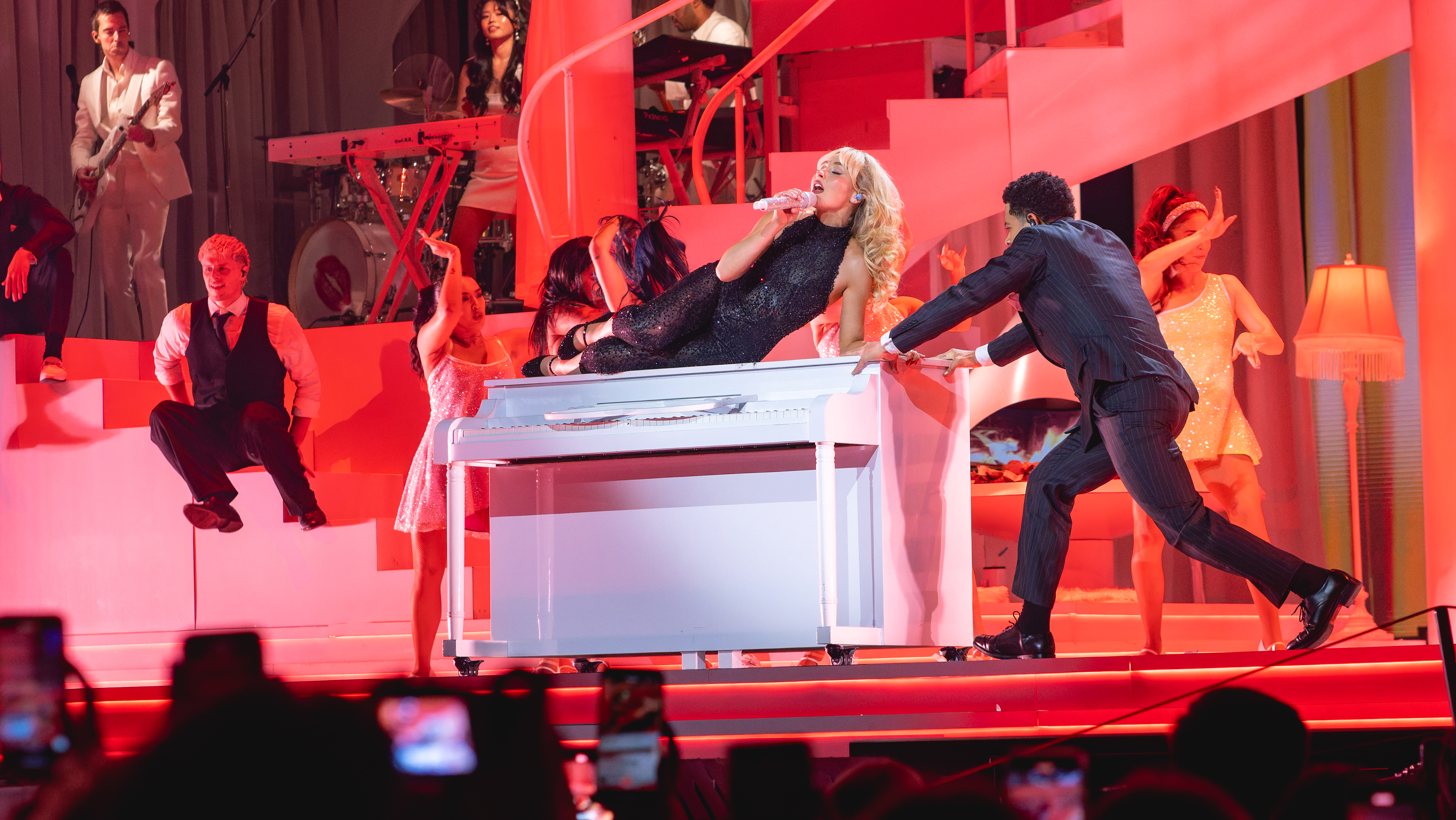
Carpenter performing "Fast Times" on the Short n' Sweet Tour in 2025

Carpenter included "Fast Times" on the setlists of the Emails I Can't Send Tour (2022-2023) and the Short n' Sweet Tour (2024-2025).

== Credits and personnel ==
Recording and management

- Recorded at Jungle City Studios (New York City)
- Mixed at MixStar Studios (Virginia Beach, Virginia)
- Mastered at Sterling Sound (Edgewater, New Jersey)
- Sabalicious Songs (BMI), Music of Big Family/Don Wyan Music (BMI), administered by Hipgnosis Songs Group, Good Deal Publishing (BMI), administered by Songs of Universal, Inc., Music By Work of Art (BMI)/Modern Arts Songs (BMI)/Songs of Starker Saxe (BMI)/Starkersaxesongs (SOCAN), administered by Sony/ATV Songs LLC (BMI)

Personnel

- Sabrina Carpenter – lead vocals, songwriting, backing vocals
- John Ryan – songwriting, production, recording, bass, guitar, drums, percussion, keyboards, backing vocals
- Julia Michaels – songwriting
- JP Saxe – songwriting
- Peter Lee Johnson - strings
- Serban Ghenea – mixing
- Bryce Bordone – assistant mix engineer
- Chris Gehringer – mastering

Credits adapted from Emails I Can't Send liner notes.

== Charts ==
Weekly chart performance
Chart (2022)	Peak position
New Zealand Hot Singles (RMNZ)	34

== Certifications ==
Region	Certification	Certified units/sales
Australia (ARIA)	Gold	35,000^{‡}
Brazil (Pro-Música Brasil)	Gold	20,000^{‡}
United States (RIAA)	Gold	500,000^{‡}
^{‡} Sales+streaming figures based on certification alone.

== Release history ==
Region	Date	Format	Label
Various	February 18, 2022	Digital download	Island
