= Because I Liked a Boy =

2022 single by Sabrina Carpenter

- Promotional poster

Single by Sabrina Carpenter

from the album Emails I Can't Send
- Written: 2021–2022
- Released: July 15, 2022
- Recorded: 2021–2022
- Studio: Jungle City Studios (New York City)
- Genre: Dark pop
- Length: 3:16
- Label: Island
- Songwriters: Sabrina Carpenter; Julia Michaels; John Ryan; JP Saxe
- Producer: John Ryan

Sabrina Carpenter singles chronology
"Vicious" (2022)	"Because I Liked a Boy" (2022)	"Nonsense" (2022)

Music video
- "Because I Liked a Boy" on YouTube

"Because I Liked a Boy" (stylized in all lowercase) is a song by American singer Sabrina Carpenter. It was released through Island Records on July 15, 2022, as the fourth single from Carpenter's fifth studio album Emails I Can't Send (2022). The song is a dark pop ballad which speaks about the emotional turmoil Carpenter experienced on social media platforms. She co-wrote the song with JP Saxe and Julia Michaels, along with producer John Ryan.

== Background and release ==
On January 22, 2021, Carpenter released the standalone single "Skin". As the song was released two weeks after Olivia Rodrigo's "Drivers License", which drew allegations of the lyric "that blonde girl" referring to Carpenter, many journalists interpreted "Skin" as a response to Rodrigo, despite Carpenter stating otherwise. This caused Carpenter to receive an onslaught of hate and become vilified on social media. She decided to co-write "Because I Liked a Boy" for her next album as a form of therapy. Speaking to Nylon in August 2022 about the song, Carpenter stated that not everyone gets to write songs so not everyone gets to have that voice to heal through, she continued saying that people who do not have that voice are able to hear these songs and hopefully move through it "because they're listening." She later said Emails I Can't Send did that for her and gave her back that voice.

Carpenter told Rolling Stone in July 2022:

It was very therapeutic to write that song from hindsight and being like, "Wow, one thing leads to another and things can really get out of hand." Just being able to own it at the end of the day, and not let it determine who you are. My favorite lyric in the song is "Tell me who I am, because I don't have a choice." It's obviously sarcastic, but in the way that people can't tell you who you are. Only if you allow them to, like really get under your skin. [Covers her face.] But truthfully, you know who you are.

She continued stating that she simply wanted people's perceptions of her to change. "So many people have dealt with being labeled something that they're not", she continued saying that whether or not she did not or did do something about it, people would still be upset.

== Composition and lyrics ==
"Because I Liked a Boy" is a dark pop ballad with soul-baring rhythms which starts as a mellow guitar. The lyrics allude to the controversy surrounding Rodrigo's "Drivers License" and the backlash Carpenter experienced on social media. Cosmopolitan's Kayleigh Roberts explained that "the song’s lyrics are all about a pretty innocent/casual relationship that ends up causing an avalanche of judgment, name-calling, cyberbullying, and general hate."

American Songwriter said Carpenter turns from being playfully reminiscent to spiteful and upset in the chorus and uses several lyrics such as "I got death threats filling up semi-trucks" to reference the onslaught of negative messages she received on social media."

== Critical reception ==
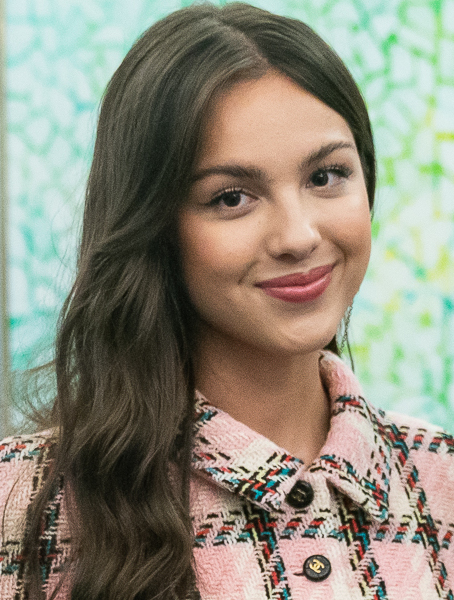
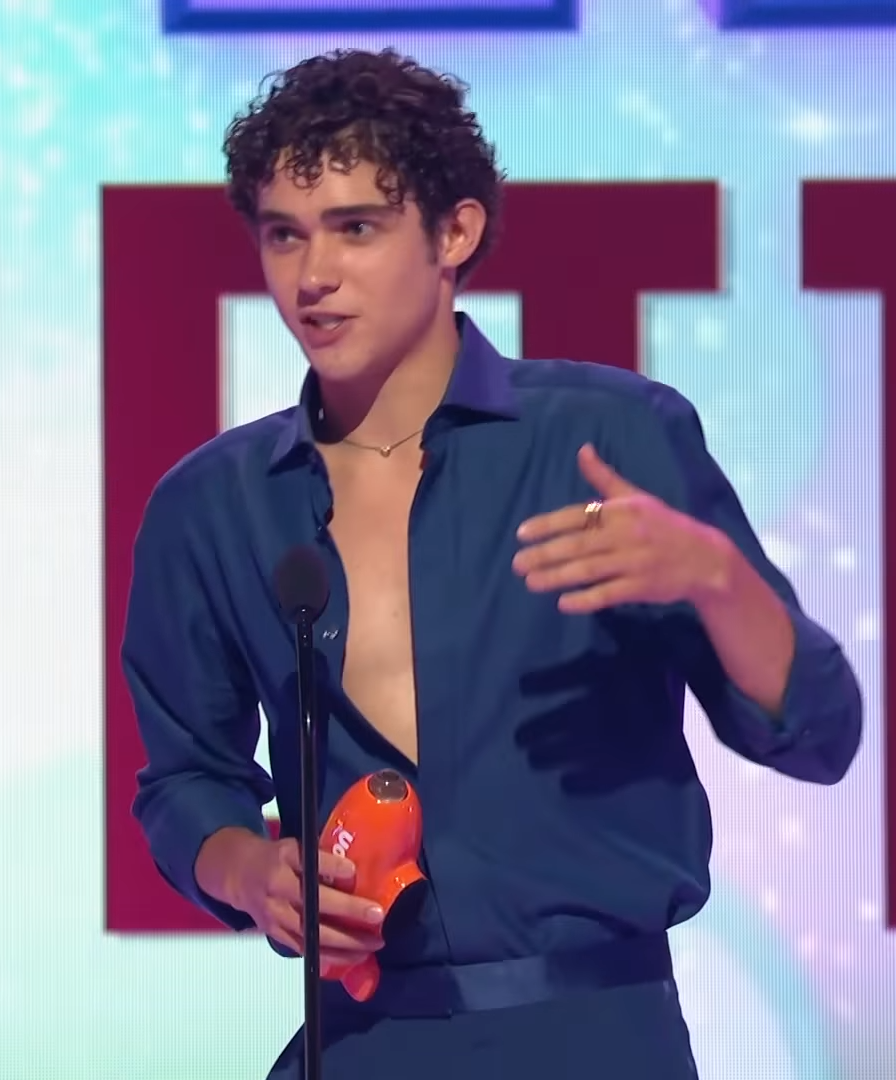
Several critics opined that the song was a response to online trolls who vilified Carpenter due to the controversy around her, Olivia Rodrigo (left), and Joshua Bassett (right).

Many critics picked "Because I Liked a Boy" as a standout track on "Emails I Can't Send". The Bulletin described it as "damn near perfect" whereas Billboard called it one of the most "viral-ready tracks" on the album, stating "this song sonically swells as a response to the fallout of Carpenter's alleged relationship with Joshua Bassett, shortly after his own alleged relationship with Olivia Rodrigo." Ilana Frost of Betches called it "The Adult, Mature, Actually Good Music Version of 'Skin'" where Carpenter targets the trolls on the internet rather than Rodrigo, she also complimented the lyricism. Hot Press called the track a "pièce de résistance", calling it a "must listen" for its transportive electric guitar and distinct forlorn beats.

== Music video ==
The music video was directed by Amber Park and released alongside both the single and its accompanying album. iHeart's Sarah Tate said that in the video "Carpenter takes center stage as the main event, surrounded by supportive friends as she sings about the beginnings of an innocent love. However, as the song continues, she laments about how the world began to vilify her, and she eventually becomes ostracized by the other performers who once showed her love."

== Credits and personnel ==
Recording and management

- Recorded at Jungle City Studios (New York City)
- Mixed at MixStar Studios (Virginia Beach, Virginia)
- Mastered at Sterling Sound (Edgewater, New Jersey)
- Sabalicious Songs (BMI), Music of Big Family/Don Wyan Music (BMI), administered by Hipgnosis Songs Group, Good Deal Publishing (BMI), administered by Songs of Universal, Inc., Music By Work of Art (BMI)/Modern Arts Songs (BMI)/Songs of Starker Saxe (BMI)/Starkersaxesongs (SOCAN), administered by Sony/ATV Songs LLC (BMI)

Personnel

- Sabrina Carpenter – lead vocals, songwriting
- John Ryan – songwriting, production, recording, programming
- Julia Michaels – songwriting
- JP Saxe – songwriting
- Serban Ghenea – mixing
- Bryce Bordone – assistant mix engineer
- Will Quinnell – mastering

Credits adapted from Emails I Can't Send liner notes.

== Charts ==
=== Weekly charts ===
2022 chart performance for "Because I Liked a Boy"
Chart (2022)	Peak position
New Zealand Hot Singles (RMNZ)	6

2024 chart performance for "Because I Liked a Boy"
Chart (2024)	Peak position
Ireland (IRMA)	86

== Certifications ==
Certifications for "Because I Liked a Boy"
Region	Certification	Certified units/sales
Australia (ARIA)	Platinum	70,000^{‡}
Brazil (Pro-Música Brasil)	Platinum	40,000^{‡}
Canada (Music Canada)	Platinum	80,000^{‡}
New Zealand (RMNZ)	Platinum	30,000^{‡}
United Kingdom (BPI)	Gold	400,000^{‡}
United States (RIAA)	Platinum	1,000,000^{‡}
^{‡} Sales+streaming figures based on certification alone.
