= That's Not How This Works =

2023 single by Charlie Puth featuring Dan + Shay

Single by Charlie Puth featuring Dan + Shay
- Released: March 31, 2023
- Recorded: April 2020
- Genre: Electropop
- Length: 2:46
- Label: Atlantic
- Songwriters: Charlie Puth; Dan Smyers; Jordan Reynolds
- Producer: Charlie Puth

Charlie Puth singles chronology
"Obsessed" (2022)	"That's Not How This Works" (2023)	"Angel Pt. 2" (2023)

Dan + Shay singles chronology
"You" (2022)	"That's Not How This Works" (2023)	"Save Me the Trouble" (2023)

Sabrina Carpenter singles chronology
"Nonsense" (2022)	"That's Not How This Works" (Sabrina's version) (2023)	"Feather" (2023)

Music video
- "That's Not How This Works" on YouTube

"That's Not How This Works" is a song by American singer-songwriter Charlie Puth, featuring vocals from American country pop music duo Dan + Shay. It was released through Atlantic Records as a single on March 31, 2023. The song was produced by Puth himself and additionally produced by Dan Smyers from Dan + Shay, and the two wrote it alongside Jordan Reynolds. It is also Dan + Shay's second time being featured on a song (they have previously been featured on RaeLynn's song "Say"). A duet version of the song, which also features fellow American singer Sabrina Carpenter, who stars in the official music video for the song, was released on April 14, 2023.

== Background ==
On the same day that "That's Not How This Works" was released, Puth elaborated on the creation of the song through social media:

Verified I wrote That's Not How This Works on zoom with @danandshay in April of 2020. I went through many changes musically in my life, but always kept this song in my back pocket because I knew how special it was. It was after all the song that propelled me into the next phase of my life. It was the song that healed me. With all of these feelings that I hadn't come face to face with before, I finally mustered up the courage to put a melody against them. When you listen to this song, I hope you feel what I felt when I wrote it- a sense of relief. Thank you @sabrinacarpenter for your brilliant portrayal of this character. You are so unbelievably multitalented. That's Not How This Works is out everywhere! Thank you.

== Composition and lyrics ==
"That's Not How This Works" is an electropop song that lyrically focuses on an ex-partner who is indecisive and confuses the other person, in which Puth and the duo members of Dan + Shay sing on the chorus at separate times: "You can't say you hate me, then call me when you're hurt / Baby, you know that's not how this works, no / That's not how this works / You can't walk away, then come back to what we were / Baby, you know that's not how this works, no / That's not how this works, no".

== Music video ==
The official music video for "That's Not How This Works", premiered alongside the release of the song on March 31, 2023. It stars both Puth and Sabrina Carpenter, who plays his love interest, in which they play the part of having a relationship and shows the good and bad moments before they break up. Puth shared a trailer video of the music video two days before its release, while the duo members of Dan + Shay do not appear in the video at all. It also includes clips of Puth creating the song in his home recording studio.

== Credits and personnel ==
- Charlie Puth – lead vocals, songwriting, production, mixing
- Dan + Shay
  - Dan Smyers – featured vocals, songwriting, additional production
  - Shay Mooney – featured vocals
- Jordan Reynolds – songwriting
- Aaron Sterling – drums
- Manny Marroquin – mixing
- Anthony Vilchis – mixing assistance
- Trey Station – mixing assistance
- Zach Pereyra – mixing assistance
- Emerson Mancini – mastering

== Charts ==
=== Weekly charts ===
Weekly chart performance for "That's Not How This Works"
Chart (2023)	Peak position
Australia Digital Tracks (ARIA)	34
Canada CHR/Top 40 (Billboard)	40
Canada Digital Song Sales (Billboard)	40
Japan Hot Overseas (Billboard Japan)	11
Lebanon (Lebanese Top 20)	12
New Zealand Hot Singles (RMNZ)	4
Singapore (RIAS)	24
South Korea (Circle)	58
UK Singles Downloads (OCC)	83
UK Singles Sales (OCC)	91
US Bubbling Under Hot 100 (Billboard)	20
US Adult Pop Airplay (Billboard)	20
US Digital Song Sales (Billboard)	42
US Pop Airplay (Billboard)	30
Vietnam (Vietnam Hot 100)	31

=== Monthly charts ===
Monthly chart performance for "That's Not How This Works"
Chart (2023)	Position
South Korea (Circle)	63

=== Year-end charts ===
Year-end chart performance for "That's Not How This Works"
Chart (2023)	Position
South Korea (Circle)	104

== Release history ==
Release dates and formats for "That's Not How This Works"
Region	Date	Formats	Label	Ref.
Various	March 31, 2023	Digital download; streaming	Atlantic	
United States	April 24, 2023	Adult contemporary radio	Atlantic	
United States	April 25, 2023	Contemporary hit radio	Atlantic	
