= Vicious (Sabrina Carpenter song) =

- An image used in the song's official lyric video

Single by Sabrina Carpenter

from the album Emails I Can't Send
- Released: July 1, 2022
- Recorded: March 2021
- Studio: Chumba Meadows (Tarzana, California)
- Genre: Pop; power pop
- Length: 2:30
- Label: Island
- Songwriters: Sabrina Carpenter; Jason Evigan; Amy Allen
- Producer: Jason Evigan

Sabrina Carpenter singles chronology
"Fast Times" (2022)	"Vicious" (2022)	"Because I Liked a Boy" (2022)

Lyric video
- "Vicious" on YouTube

"Vicious" is a song recorded by American singer Sabrina Carpenter from her fifth studio album Emails I Can't Send (2022), included as the second track of the album. The track was written by Carpenter, Amy Allen and its producer Jason Evigan. The pop and power pop song was released by Island Records as the third single of the album on July 1, 2022.

== Background and release ==
On June 15, Carpenter shared a TikTok video with a snippet of the song and its pre-save link. A follow up to "Fast Times," the single was released on July 1, 2022 to promote her then-upcoming fifth studio album. Carpenter performed the song at the NMPA & Billboard Grammy Week Showcase.

"Vicious" has been described as a pop and power pop song.

== Credits and personnel ==
Recording and management

- Recorded at Chumba Meadows (Tarzana, California)
- Mixed at Henson Recording Studios (Los Angeles, California)
- Mastered at Sterling Sound (Edgewater, New Jersey)
- Sabalicious Songs (BMI), Big Tall Guy Music (BMI), administered by Sony/ATV Songs LLC, Kenny + Betty Tunes/superreal Songs/Artist Publishing Group West (ASCAP), all rights administered by Kobalt Songs Music Publishing

Personnel

- Sabrina Carpenter – lead vocals, songwriting
- Jason Evigan – songwriting, production, vocal production, recording, programming, guitar, bass, synths
- Amy Allen – songwriting
- Jackson Rau – recording
- Josh Gudwin – mixing
- Heidi Wang – mix engineer
- Will Quinnell – mastering

Credits adapted from Emails I Can't Send liner notes.

== Charts ==
Chart performance
Chart (2022)	Peak position
New Zealand Hot Singles (RMNZ)	26

== Certifications ==
Region	Certification	Certified units/sales
Australia (ARIA)	Gold	35,000^{‡}
Brazil (Pro-Música Brasil)	Gold	20,000^{‡}
^{‡} Sales+streaming figures based on certification alone.

== Release history ==
Release history and formats
Region	Date	Format	Label
Various	July 1, 2022	Digital download; streaming	Island
