= Nonsense (song) =

2022 single by Sabrina Carpenter

Single by Sabrina Carpenter

from the album Emails I Can't Send
- B-side: "A Nonsense Christmas"
- Released: November 14, 2022
- Studio: Enemy Dojo (Malibu, California)
- Genre: Pop; R&B; bubblegum; pop rock
- Length: 2:43
- Label: Island
- Songwriters: Sabrina Carpenter; Julian Bunetta; Steph Jones
- Producer: Julian Bunetta

Sabrina Carpenter singles chronology
"Because I Liked a Boy" (2022)	"Nonsense" (2022)	"That's Not How This Works" (Sabrina's version) (2023)

Music video
- "Nonsense" on YouTube

"Nonsense" is a song by American singer Sabrina Carpenter from her fifth studio album, Emails I Can't Send (2022). Carpenter wrote the track with Steph Jones and Julian Bunetta; the latter also handled its production. Originally released alongside the album as its ninth track, "Nonsense" became the album's fifth single after gaining traction on the video-sharing app TikTok. It became known as one of Carpenter's signature songs along with 2024's "Espresso".

The song drew associations with Ariana Grande's style. An accompanying music video for "Nonsense" was released on November 10, 2022. Additionally, a sped-up version and a holiday remix, entitled "A Nonsense Christmas", were released. The song peaked at number 35 on the Billboard Global 200 chart and reached the top 10 in the Netherlands, the Philippines, and Singapore. A remix of the song with Coi Leray was released on March 23, 2023.

== Background and release ==
On June 30, 2022, Carpenter announced the release of her fifth studio album Emails I Can't Send and unveiled its tracklist on July 5 via her social media accounts, where "Nonsense" was to be the ninth track on the album. The song was released on July 15, 2022, alongside the rest of the album.

"Nonsense" has been described as a pop, R&B, bubblegum, and pop rock song with a sound reminiscent of Ariana Grande. Carpenter released a Christmas version of the song, where she put a "more festive, flirty spin" on various lyrics from the original.

During her Emails I Can't Send Tour and various other live appearances, such as Saturday Night Live, Jimmy Kimmel Live!, Dick Clark's New Year's Rockin' Eve and the 2023 MTV Video Music Awards, Carpenter began altering the song's outro after the original last lyrics "How quickly can you take your clothes off pop quiz?" to reference the city or the event where she was performing.

The various ad-libbed moments went viral on the video-sharing social media app TikTok. The song's virality, along with having become an immediate fan-favorite on Emails I Can't Send, led Carpenter to choose "Nonsense" as the album's next single.

The custom outros were retired when Carpenter performed the song during the Short n' Sweet Tour in 2024, with her mic "malfunctioning" as she was lowered from the stage and a satirical "Technical Difficulties" screen showing on the overhead screen.

== Accolades ==
Awards and nominations for "Nonsense"
Organization	Year	Category	Result	Ref.
iHeartRadio Music Awards	2024	Best Lyrics	Nominated	

== Commercial performance ==
"Nonsense" initially debuted at number 8 on the US Bubbling Under Hot 100 chart, an extension of the Billboard Hot 100, on the chart December 24, 2022, and spent 3 weeks on the chart. On the chart dated January 28, 2023, "Nonsense" debuted at number 75 on the Hot 100, becoming the album's first single to chart and earning Carpenter her second career entry after her 2021 single "Skin". The song debuted on the Mainstream Top 40 at number 35 on the chart January 28, 2023. It later entered the top 10 of the chart at number 10 on the week dated May 20, 2023, marking Carpenter's first top ten hit on the format. During the tracking week of its chart debut, the track received over 5.82 million on-demand streams in the United States alone, which was a 66% spike from its previous week in streaming data. Globally, "Nonsense" reached number 35 on the Global 200 chart.

"Nonsense" initially debuted at number 69 on the UK Singles Chart, on the chart January 26, 2023 (week ending), entering the top 40 a week later at number 32. This became Carpenter's second UK top 40 single following "Skin" which peaked at number 28 in February 2021.

== Music video ==
The music video for "Nonsense" was directed by Danica Kleinknecht and filmed on October 26, 2022. It premiered on Carpenter's Vevo channel via YouTube on November 10, 2022. The music video has Carpenter, as well as her friends, played by Paloma Sandoval and Whitney Peak, going to a party. There they meet a trio of boys, which are played by the actresses themselves. Carpenter is shown flirting with her male counterpart, who is wearing a "dipshit" hat.

== Track listing ==
- Digital single – sped up version
1. "Nonsense" – 2:43
2. "Nonsense" (sped up version) – 2:17
- "A Nonsense Christmas" digital single
1. "A Nonsense Christmas" – 2:33
2. "Nonsense" – 2:43
- 7-inch vinyl
1. "Nonsense" – 2:43
2. "A Nonsense Christmas" – 2:33

== Credits and personnel ==
Credits adapted from Emails I Can't Send and single's 7" vinyl liner notes.

Recording and management

- Recorded at Enemy Dojo (Malibu, California)
- Mixed at Henson Recording Studios (Los Angeles, California)
- Mastered at Sterling Sound (Edgewater, New Jersey)
- Sabalicious Songs (BMI), Music of Big Family/Dragon Bunny Music (BMI) administered by Hipgnosis Songs Group, Vistaville Music (ASCAP) obo itself and Steph Jones Who Music (ASCAP) and Hipgnosis Hits (ASCAP)

Personnel

- Sabrina Carpenter – lead vocals, songwriting
- Julian Bunetta – songwriting, production, recording, programming
- Steph Jones – songwriting, backing vocals
- Josh Gudwin – mixing
- Heidi Wang – mix engineer
- Will Quinnell – mastering

== Charts ==
=== Weekly charts ===
Weekly chart performance for "Nonsense"
Chart (2022–2025)	Peak position
Australia (ARIA)	22
Canada Hot 100 (Billboard)	37
Canada CHR/Top 40 (Billboard)	26
Global 200 (Billboard)	35
Greece (IFPI)	48
Ireland (IRMA)	20
Japan Hot Overseas (Billboard Japan)	8
Lithuania (AGATA)	43
Malaysia (Billboard)	11
Malaysia International (RIM)	7
Netherlands (Single Tip)	3
New Zealand (Recorded Music NZ)	31
Philippines (Billboard)	6
Philippines Hot 100 (Billboard Philippines)	16
Portugal (AFP)	124
Singapore (RIAS)	6
Sweden Heatseeker (Sverigetopplistan)	2
UK Singles (Official Charts)	32
US Billboard Hot 100	56
US Adult Pop Airplay (Billboard)	39
US Dance Airplay (Billboard)	37
US Pop Airplay (Billboard)	10
Vietnam Hot 100 (Billboard)	62

Weekly chart performance for "A Nonsense Christmas"
Chart (2022–2026)	Peak position
Australia (ARIA)	23
Global 200 (Billboard)	70
Greece International (IFPI)	39
Ireland (IRMA)	9
Lithuania (AGATA)	45
Netherlands (Single Top 100)	66
New Zealand Hot Singles (Recorded Music NZ)	39
Poland (Polish Streaming Top 100)	82
Portugal (AFP)	87
Sweden Heatseeker (Sverigetopplistan)	4
Switzerland (Schweizer Hitparade)	64
UK Singles (Official Charts)	16
US Holiday 100 (Billboard)	79

=== Year-end charts ===
2023 year-end chart performance for "Nonsense"
Chart (2023)	Position
Global 200 (Billboard)	180
US Mainstream Top 40 (Billboard)	32

2024 year-end chart performance for "Nonsense"
Chart (2024)	Position
Australia (ARIA)	97
Global 200 (Billboard)	112
Philippines (Philippines Hot 100)	43

== Certifications ==
Certifications for "Nonsense"
Region	Certification	Certified units/sales
Australia (ARIA)	4× Platinum	280,000^{‡}
Brazil (Pro-Música Brasil)	Diamond	160,000^{‡}
Canada (Music Canada)	5× Platinum	400,000^{‡}
Denmark (IFPI Danmark)	Gold	45,000^{‡}
France (SNEP)	Gold	100,000^{‡}
New Zealand (RMNZ)	3× Platinum	90,000^{‡}
Poland (ZPAV)	Gold	25,000^{‡}
Spain (Promusicae)	Gold	30,000^{‡}
United Kingdom (BPI)	Platinum	600,000^{‡}
United States (RIAA)	4× Platinum	4,000,000^{‡}
Streaming
Central America (CFC)	Platinum	7,000,000^{†}
Japan (RIAJ)	Gold	50,000,000^{†}
Sweden (GLF)	Gold	6,000,000^{†}
^{‡} Sales+streaming figures based on certification alone.^{†} Streaming-only figures based on certification alone.

== Release history ==
Release dates and formats for "Nonsense"
Region	Date	Format	Version	Label(s)	Ref.
Various	November 14, 2022	Digital download; streaming	Sped-up	Island	
Various	December 7, 2022	Digital download; streaming	Christmas remix	Island	
Various	March 23, 2023	Digital download; streaming	Coi Leray remix	Island	
United States	December 19, 2022	Contemporary hit radio	Original	Island; Republic	
Various	November 18, 2023	7-inch single	Original; Christmas remix	Island	
Italy	December 13, 2024	Radio airplay	Christmas remix	Island	
