= Skinny Dipping (song) =

Single by Sabrina Carpenter

from the album Emails I Can't Send
- Released: September 9, 2021
- Recorded: Summer 2021
- Studio: Jungle City (New York City)
- Genre: Pop
- Length: 2:58
- Label: Island
- Songwriters: Sabrina Carpenter; Leroy Clampitt; Julia Michaels; JP Saxe
- Producer: Leroy Clampitt

Sabrina Carpenter singles chronology
| "Skin" (2021) | "Skinny Dipping" (2021) | "Fast Times" (2022) |

Music video
- "Skinny Dipping" on YouTube

"Skinny Dipping" (stylized in all lowercase) is a song recorded by American singer Sabrina Carpenter from her fifth studio album Emails I Can't Send (2022), included as the eleventh track of the album. The track was written by Carpenter, Julia Michaels, JP Saxe and its producer Leroy Clampitt. The song was released by Island Records as the lead single of the album on September 9, 2021.

== Background and release ==
On August 18, Carpenter shared a post with several clues from the song, including the mention of the first verse, "it'll be a Wednesday", in the post’s description, the lines "if we could take it all off and just exist?" and "water under the bridge". On August 23, Carpenter sent an email to her fans with the song’s codified title on a message and, later, posted a snippet of the song with the title revealed. On August 30, Carpenter finally revealed the single's cover art and release date. The song was released on September 9, along with its music video. It was written by Carpenter, Julia Michaels, JP Saxe and Leroy Clampitt in New York during the summer of 2021.

== Composition and lyrical interpretation ==
Musically, "Skinny Dipping" is a two minutes and fifty-eight seconds acoustic guitar-driven midtempo pop song. In terms of music notation, "Skinny Dipping" was composed using 4/4 common time in the key of E major, with a moderate tempo of 92 beats per minute. The song follows the chord progression of E–B-Amaj7-B. Carpenter's vocal performance on the verses in sung on a speaking style and her range spans, approximately, from the low note of E_{3} to the high note of E_{5}, giving the song two octaves of range.

== Music video ==
The official music video was released along with the song and was directed by Amber Park. In the music video, Carpenter writes letters to herself and puts them in a box labeled "this too shall pass" and, at the end, after dancing barefoot in a green dress on the streets of New York, she throws the letters into the air. The letters put in the box allude to the emails Carpenter wrote for herself, from which the inspiration for the songs on her album came. There are easter eggs to the follow-up single, "Fast Times", including the end of the music video where a different version of Carpenter riding a motorcycle appears, providing a snippet and a clue to the song's music video.

== Live performances ==
On October 29, 2021, Carpenter performed the song on The Tonight Show Starring Jimmy Fallon wearing a black and white gingham sequin dress, playing a Nord Electro 6D, and surrounded by band.

== Track listing ==
Digital download
| No. | Title | Length |
|---|---|---|
| 1. | "Skinny Dipping" | 2:58 |

Digital download – acoustic version
| No. | Title | Length |
|---|---|---|
| 1. | "Skinny Dipping" (acoustic) | 3:13 |

== Credits and personnel ==
Recording and management

- Recorded at Jungle City Studios (New York City)
- Mastered at Sterling Sound (Edgewater, New Jersey)
- Sabalicious Songs (BMI), Avant-Garde LOL/Honua c/o Kobalt (ASCAP), Good Deal Publishing (BMI), administered by Songs of Universal, Inc., Music By Work of Art (BMI)/Modern Arts Songs (BMI)/Songs of Starker Saxe (BMI)/Starkersaxesongs (SOCAN), administered by Sony/ATV Songs LLC (BMI)

Personnel

- Sabrina Carpenter – lead vocals, songwriting, backing vocals
- Leroy Clampitt – songwriting, production, recording, programming, bass, guitar, drums, keyboards, percussion
- Julia Michaels – songwriting
- JP Saxe – songwriting, guitar
- Josh Gudwin – mixing
- Alida Garpestad Peck – backing vocals
- Noah Conrad - trumpet
- Yi-Mei Templeman - cello
- Chris Gehringer – mastering

Credits adapted from Emails I Can't Send liner notes.

== Release history ==
Release history and formats
| Region | Date | Format | Label |
|---|---|---|---|
| Various | September 9, 2021 | Digital download; streaming | Island |
