= Skin (Sabrina Carpenter song) =

2021 single by Sabrina Carpenter

Single by Sabrina Carpenter
- Released: January 22, 2021
- Recorded: 2020
- Genre: Synth-pop
- Length: 2:58
- Label: Island
- Songwriters: Sabrina Carpenter; Tia Scola; Ryan McMahon
- Producer: Ryan McMahon

Sabrina Carpenter singles chronology
"Wow" (remix) (2020)	"Skin" (2021)	"Skinny Dipping" (2021)

Music video
- "Skin" on YouTube

"Skin" is a song by American singer Sabrina Carpenter. It was released through Island Records on January 22, 2021. The song marks her first release with Island after previously being signed to Hollywood Records since 2014. It was written by Carpenter, Tia Scola and its producer Ryan McMahon. "Skin" is a synth-pop ballad.

== Composition ==
"Skin" is a synth-pop ballad with a length of two minutes and fifty eight seconds. It was written by Carpenter, Tia Scola and Ryan McMahon. McMahon also handled the song's production. "Skin" is composed in the key of G major, and has a tempo of 106 BPM. It uses compound time 12/8 in verses and common time 4/4 everywhere else with a chord progression of Em-D-G-B-C-D.

Several publications suggested the lyrics are centered around the highly publicized "love triangle" between Carpenter, Olivia Rodrigo and Joshua Bassett, posing as a response to Rodrigo's single "Drivers License", as the track was released only two weeks after Rodrigo's single had come out. Carpenter has since denied the claim that the song is a diss track, explaining that it isn't "calling out one single person". Carpenter has stated that,

"People will make a narrative out of something always [...] and I think this was like a really interesting song for people to kind of misinterpret and make into something that it wasn’t really supposed to be in the first place."

== Commercial performance ==
The week of its release, "Skin" debuted at 48 on the Billboard Hot 100 making it the highest debut on the chart for the week. The song also marked Carpenter's first Hot 100 entry with her previous singles "Thumbs" and "Why" charting on the Bubbling Under Hot 100 at numbers 1 and 21 respectively. Furthermore, the song reached number 12 in Ireland and the top 30 in the United Kingdom.

== Music video ==
The music video for "Skin" was directed by Jason Lester and released on February 1, 2021. The 3-minute long music video features an appearance by Gavin Leatherwood, who plays Carpenter's love interest.

== Live performances ==
Carpenter performed the song live on The Late Late Show with James Corden. She also performed the song at the 2021 GLAAD Media Awards. During this performance, Carpenter sang in front of a montage of videos with transgender youth appearing behind her, "sending a powerful message of love and acceptance to the trans community". On May 11, 2023, Carpenter performed the song during the second night in New York of leg two of the Emails I Can't Send Tour.

== Credits and personnel ==
Credits adapted from Tidal.

- Sabrina Carpenter – lead vocals, songwriting, background vocals
- Ryan McMahon – production, songwriting, programming, record engineering
- Tia Scola – songwriting
- Kevin Reeves – masterer
- George Seara – mixer

== Charts ==
Chart performance
Chart (2021)	Peak position
Australia (ARIA)	61
Austria (Ö3 Austria Top 40)	62
Belgium (Ultratip Bubbling Under Flanders)	41
Canada Hot 100 (Billboard)	36
Dominican Republic Anglo (Monitor Latino)	20
Global 200 (Billboard)	33
Greece (IFPI)	73
Ireland (IRMA)	12
Netherlands (Dutch Top 40 Tipparade)	19
Netherlands (Single Top 100)	78
New Zealand Hot Singles (RMNZ)	1
Portugal (AFP)	66
Singapore (RIAS)	21
Switzerland (Schweizer Hitparade)	99
UK Singles (OCC)	28
US Billboard Hot 100	48
US Pop Airplay (Billboard)	30

== Certifications ==
Certifications
Region	Certification	Certified units/sales
Australia (ARIA)	Gold	35,000^{‡}
Brazil (Pro-Música Brasil)	Platinum	40,000^{‡}
New Zealand (RMNZ)	Gold	15,000^{‡}
United Kingdom (BPI)	Silver	200,000^{‡}
United States (RIAA)	Gold	500,000^{‡}
^{‡} Sales+streaming figures based on certification alone.

== Release history ==
Release dates and formats
Region	Date	Format	Label	Ref.
Various	January 22, 2021	Digital download; streaming	Island	
United States	January 26, 2021	Contemporary hit radio	Island; Republic	
