= Clouds (soundtrack) =

2020 soundtrack album

Clouds (Music from the Disney+ Original Movie)

Soundtrack album by Various artists
- Released: October 16, 2020
- Genre: Film soundtrack
- Length: 52:50
- Label: Walt Disney; Interscope
- Producer: Brian Tyler; Zach Sobiech; Nicholai Baxter; Jamey Heath; Jeff Hazin; Samantha Brown; John Nathaniel; Brent Kutzle

Singles from Clouds (Music from the Disney+ Original Movie)
- 1. "Wild Life" Released: September 25, 2020; 2. "Clouds" Released: October 9, 2020; 3. "afterthoughts" Released: October 15, 2020

Clouds (Music from the Disney+ Original Movie) is the soundtrack album to the 2020 film Clouds. Based on the life of late American singer/songwriter Zach Sobiech from the memoir Fly a Little Higher: How God Answered a Mom's Small Prayer in a Big Way by Laura Sobiech, it is directed by Justin Baldoni and featured musical score composed by Brian Tyler. The soundtrack featured incorporated songs by the lead actors Fin Argus and Sabrina Carpenter, Sobiech's dissolved band A Firm Handshake, Renforshort and OneRepublic. It was released by the record labels Interscope and Walt Disney on October 16, 2020. Prior to the soundtrack release, OneRepublic's original song "Wild Life" was released as the lead single on September 25. The titular track "Clouds", which was Sobiech's own song, altered and composed by Tyler and performed by the lead cast, was released as the second single on October 9, and the third song "afterthoughts" performed by Renforshort was released as a single on October 15, accompanied by a music video.

== Development ==
The film marked Tyler's second collaboration with Baldoni after Five Feet Apart (2019). As Tyler, liked writing for melodious and melancholic songs, he agreed for scoring for the film, which was based on the life of late musician. He formally consulted, Sobiech's family and described about the film and its musical approach. He further bought Sobiech's mixtapes for the musical approach, he demanded as he had to create something that fit with and responded to the folk-pop vibe of Sobiech's tunes. Tyler believed that "he wanted to celebrate Sobiech's legacy through his score, which also reflected the type of musician he would have grown into". The film incorporates Sobiech's songs, which Tyler "altered the way he had approached". He played several instruments while recording the score, including piano, harp, glockenspiel, guitar, while also provided backing vocals for few tracks.

== Promotion ==
As a part of the promotional activities, Clouds: A Musical Celebration, a virtual concert dedicated to Sobeich was streamed live through the official Facebook page of Disney+ on October 24, 2020, and was later published to YouTube. Apart from the lead actors, Fin Argus and Sabrina Carpenter, performing the songs, the concert featured musical performances from OneRepublic, renforshort, Sobiech's bandmate Samantha "Sammy" Brown, and additional performances by Jason Mraz and DCappella, while director Justin Baldoni, and few of the supporting cast members, appeared in the concert.

== Track listing ==
No.	Title	Writer(s)	Performer(s)	Length
1.	"Galaxies"	Claire Wineland; Isabella Richardson; Jamey Heath	Isabella Richardson	04:27
2.	"Sexy and I Know It"	Stefan Kendal Gordy; Skyler Gordy; GoonRock; Erin Beck; George M. Robertson; Kenneth Oliver	Fin Argus	03:23
3.	"Blueberries"	Samantha Brown; Zach Sobiech	Sabrina Carpenter	02:22
4.	"Clouds"	Sobiech	Argus; Carpenter	03:05
5.	"afterthoughts"	David Charles Fischer; Jeff Hazin; Renforshort	Renforshort	02:55
6.	"Fix Me Up"	Brown; Sobiech	Argus; Carpenter	04:37
7.	"My Little Dancer"	Sobiech; Argus	Argus	03:08
8.	"How to Go to Confession"	Brown; Sobiech	Carpenter	03:06
9.	"Clouds Score Suite"		Brian Tyler	09:19
10.	"Purple Pink"	Brown	Brown	02:36
11.	"Star Hopping"	Brown; Sobiech	A Firm Handshake	02:54
12.	"Ames"	Brown; Sobiech	A Firm Handshake	02:52
13.	"Sandcastles"	Brown; Sobiech	A Firm Handshake	03:31
14.	"Wild Life"	Brent Kutzle; John Nathaniel; Ryan Tedder	OneRepublic	04:27
Total length:				52:50

== Reception ==
Filmtracks.com wrote "The movie required its original music to exist amongst a number of source-like placements of music that Sobiech performed and penned, with Tyler serving to help produce some of these insertions. The score, therefore, fits in between these obvious feel-good placements of song material and drives a comparatively conservative emotional mood that is not meant to guide the personality of the film so much as augment its ambience. The score on album loses some of its muster due to its intended redundancy, but that won't deter enthusiasts of the concept from loving every moment of its soft rock reverence. It's a score with undeniable heart from Tyler, but one that packs its best punch in a shorter presentation."

== Charts ==
Chart performance for Clouds (Music from the Disney+ Original Movie)
Chart (2021)	Peak position
US Soundtrack Albums (Billboard)	56

== Accolades ==
Award	Date of ceremony	Category	Recipient(s)	Result	Ref.
Hollywood Music in Media Awards	January 27, 2021	Best Original Score in a Television/Streaming Film	Brian Tyler	Nominated	

== Clouds (Original Score) ==
Clouds (Original Score)

Film score by Brian Tyler
- Released: November 6, 2020
- Genre: Film score
- Length: 59:11
- Label: Walt Disney
- Producer: Brian Tyler

Brian Tyler chronology
Charlie's Angels: Original Motion Picture Soundtrack (2019)	Clouds (2020)	Those Who Wish Me Dead (2021)

Clouds (Original Score) is the score album, featuring 20-tracks composed by Brian Tyler. It was released by Walt Disney Records on November 6, 2020.

No.	Title	Length
1.	"Clouds Theme"	9:16
2.	"Hope Eternal"	2:30
3.	"Expectations"	2:47
4.	"Everyday"	2:39
5.	"Future Days"	2:06
6.	"Progression"	1:50
7.	"Upward"	3:45
8.	"Metro"	1:58
9.	"What Matters Most"	1:52
10.	"All That We Hope"	1:42
11.	"Inspiration Amid the Clouds"	2:32
12.	"Driven"	2:06
13.	"Playing the Metro"	1:48
14.	"Embrace"	2:17
15.	"Basking in Our Joy"	2:16
16.	"Looking Skyward"	2:42
17.	"Yours"	3:51
18.	"Your Name in Lights"	3:01
19.	"Moments Fade"	2:42
20.	"Clouds Main Title"	5:21
