= Children's Cancer Research Fund =

US nonprofit organization

- Founded: 1981
- Location: Minneapolis, Minneapolis
- Key people: Elizabeth Crippen Allen, chief executive officer
- Website: childrenscancer.org

Children's Cancer Research Fund is a not-for-profit organization focused on raising money to fund research for childhood cancer. In addition to funding research, they also provide support programs for families affected by cancer.

== History ==
Children's Cancer Research Fund was founded by Diana and Norm Hageboeck in 1981 after their daughter died of leukemia. The organization officially registered as a 501(c)(3) charitable non-profit in February 1998.

In 2013, the Zach Sobiech Osteosarcoma Fund was established to designate funding specifically for osteosarcoma research. It's administered by the Children's Cancer Research Fund and donations fund research at the University of Minnesota. The fund honors Zach Sobiech, a musician who died of osteosarcoma in May 2013 at age 18.

In 2023, Elizabeth Crippen Allen was hired as the chief executive officer, replacing former CEO Daniel Gumnit.

== Events ==
The first fundraising event, "Dawn of a Dream", honored the Hageboeck's daughter, Katie, who died of leukemia. Since 1981, the Dawn of a Dream fundraiser has raised over $22 million for Children's Cancer Research Fund.

In December 2013, 5,000 people gathered in the rotunda at Mall of America in Bloomington, Minnesota, as part of the first "Clouds Choir", an annual event that raises money for the Zach Sobiech Osteosarcoma Research Fund. During the event, participants pay tribute to Zach Sobiech while singing his hit song "Clouds". In 2019, 6,000 people attended the event, along with celebrities from the film Clouds: Justin Baldoni, Neve Campbell, Tom Everett Scott, Sabrina Carpenter, Madison Iseman and Fin Argus.

In 2015, Great Cycle Challenge USA was launched to support Children's Cancer Research Fund. The event encourages participants to set a goal for riding their bike over the course of a month and to ask their family and friends to support them as they ride their bikes to raise awareness for cancer research. Over the history of Great Cycle Challenge USA, more than 230,000 people have participated from all 50 states, raising more than $24 million for Children's Cancer Research Fund.

== Research ==
Since its inception, the Children's Cancer Research Fund has invested over $186 million to research and support programs. In 2014, money raised through the Zach Sobiech Osteosarcoma Fund helped support breakthrough research. With funding support from Children's Cancer Research Fund, the osteosarcoma research team at the University of Minnesota discovered Semaphorin-4D (SEMA4D), a gene associated with the cause of osteosarcoma.
