= Dear Amelia =

Studio album by Renforshort
- Released: July 8, 2022
- Genres: Pop rock; alt-pop
- Length: 35:51
- Label: Interscope
- Producers: Afterhrs; Travis Barker; Jeff Hazin; Nick Long; Pom Pom; John Ryan; Andy Seltzer; Y2K

Renforshort chronology
Off Saint Dominique (2021)	Dear Amelia (2022)	Clean Hands Dirty Water (2024)

Singles from Dear Amelia
- 1. "Moshpit" Released: January 28, 2022; 2. "Made for You" Released: March 31, 2022; 3. "We'll Make This OK" Released: May 12, 2022; 4. "I Miss Myself" Released: June 23, 2022; 5. "Julian, King of Manhattan" Released: July 1, 2022

Dear Amelia is the debut studio album by the Canadian singer-songwriter Renforshort. It was released by Interscope Records on July 8, 2022. After releasing two extended plays with Interscope, working and performing with high-profile musicians, and contributing to the soundtrack of the 2020 film Clouds, Renforshort began working on her debut album. The album contains appearances from the drummer Travis Barker and the singer-songwriter Jake Bugg; Bugg is one Renforshort's favorite all-time musicians.

Dear Amelia is a pop rock and alt-pop album that explores themes of unhealthy relationships, mental illness, and suicide. The album was also written about challenges faced by young women. Renforshort prioritized on writing songs that were sincere, honest, and resonated with young women. The album was mainly produced by her longtime collaborator Jeff Hazin, alongside a variety of record producers including Travis Barker, Nick Long, John Ryan, and Y2K. The album's story revolves around its titular character Amelia, whom was based on real people in Renforshort's life and the feeling of wanting to share her feelings but unsure of how to. The album was promoted with five singles, a tour across North America, Europe, and Australia, and the "Letters to Amelia" initiative. Critics enjoyed Renforshort's songwriting and gave the album positive reviews, though its production received criticism from Clash.

== Background ==
Since Renforshort was a child, she wanted to be a singer. Her brothers are also musicians, as her parents wanted their children to be musicians. When she was in ninth or tenth grade, she would often attend open mic nights with her friend; though some nights she had to perform solo. When she performed solo, she would sing and play the guitar onstage at the same time, making her realize she could become a performer. When she was 13, she began posting covers of songs to YouTube. In 2016, she met the producer Jeff Hazin, who has become a frequent collaborator since. She began releasing music as an independent artist and signed with Interscope Records in 2020, after receiving critical acclaim. Her debut extended play Teenage Angst was released by Interscope in 2020, which was followed by Off Saint Dominique in 2021. She has also worked with Mike Shinoda, Travis Barker, and Machine Gun Kelly, went on tour with Yungblud, and contributed to the soundtrack of the 2020 Disney+ film Clouds.

== Writing and production ==
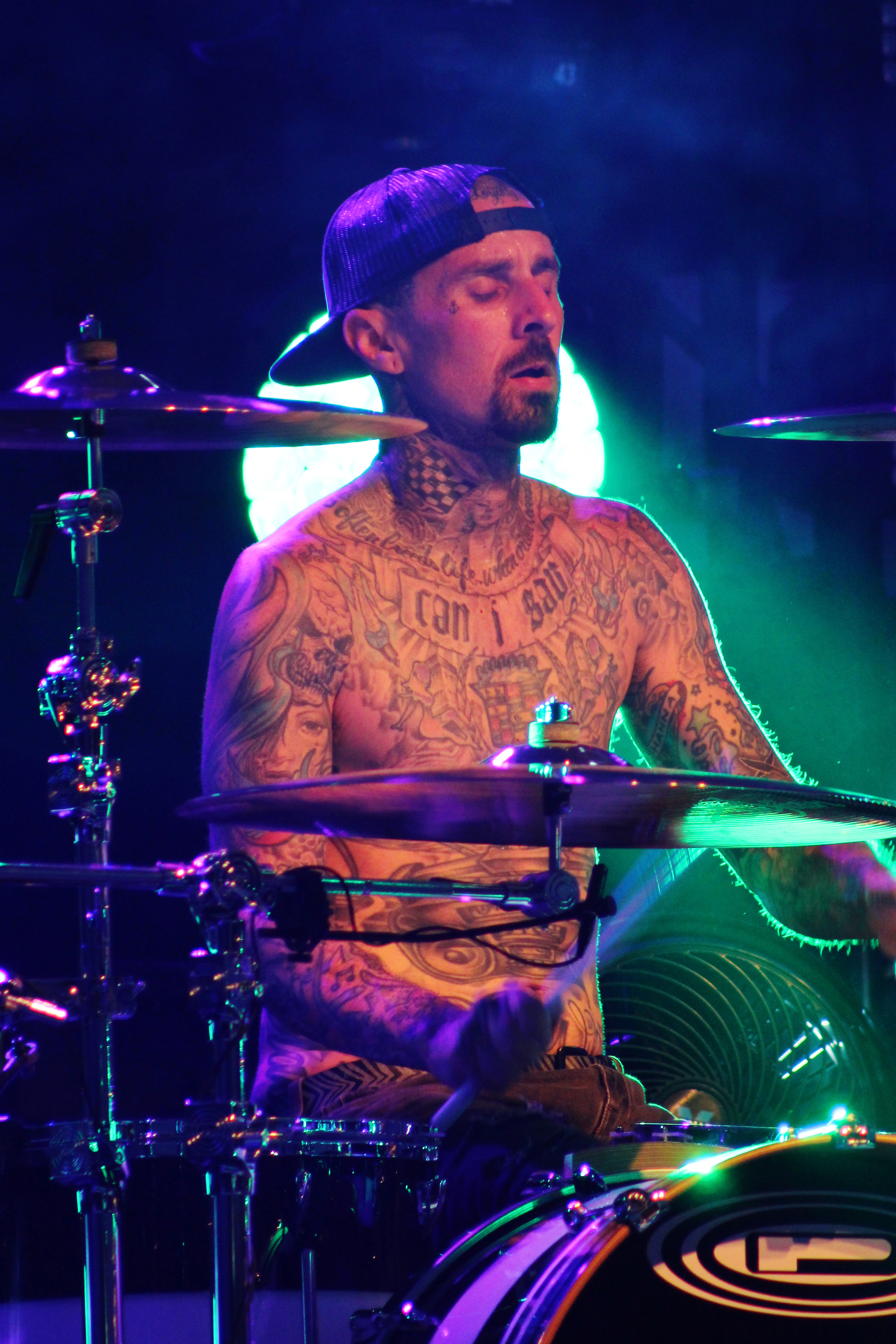
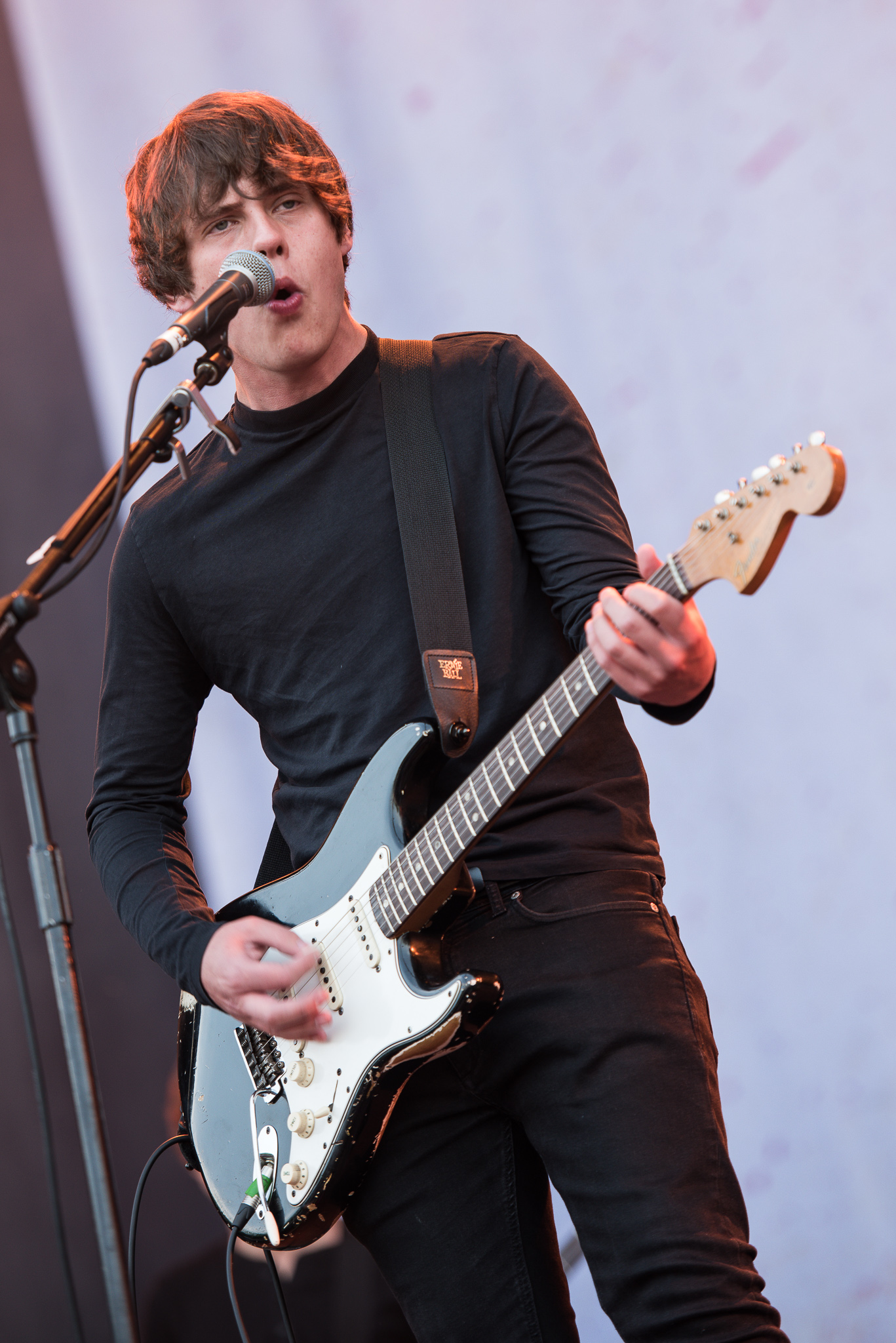
Dear Amelia contains guest appearances from Travis Barker (left) and Jake Bugg (right).

When writing Dear Amelia, Renforshort prioritized on writing songs that were sincere and resonated with young women. When she was growing up, she believed that the latter was lacking, telling NME "This album is the honesty I needed to hear growing up as a young woman". Talking with the Alternative Press, she explained how she did not feel "heard or seen in the media while growing up," and wanted to give others what she never had. Writing songs makes her "more honest" as a person and insists that the writing in her music is honest. Because Renforshort would often listen to hyperpop while creating the album, the song "We'll Make This OK" was originally a "full-on hyperpop song" before Barker contributed to it. "Let You Down" was written with Jake Bugg in mind, as he is one of Renforshort's favorite musicians of all time. She did not write a second verse for the song because she was intent on him appearing on it. Months after writing it, her manager sent her a new version of the song that featured vocals from Bugg. Dear Amelia was produced by her longtime collaborator Jeff Hazin, alongside Andy Seltzer, Nick Long, John Ryan, Y2K, Afterhrs, Pom Pom, and Barker.

Dear Amelia is written about the album's titular character, Amelia. Renforshort described the character as "a lot of people" and "the personification of parts of [her] brain". She is also based on people in her life that have committed suicide, and the inspiration behind the character was the feeling of "wanting to open up but not knowing how". Renforshort has further stated: "You can make Amelia anyone". She has also explained that the album "flows like a story". On Renforshort's social media, there were a collection of letters addressed to Amelia; the character "receives regular and somewhat cryptic updates on [Renforshort's] troubles and triumphs".

== Composition ==
=== Music and lyrics ===
Dear Amelia is primarily a pop rock and alt-pop album, and has also been described as hyperpop, alternative rock, and emo pop by select music publications. The album explores themes of unhealthy relationships, mental illness, and suicide. The album was also written about challenges faced by young women, such as mental health, unhealthy relationships, and problems with identity. Oshen Douglas-McCormick from Clash believed the album "takes a dive into [Renforshort's] brain" and reads like a "lovesick diary in a tearjerker romance movie". They further wrote the album tells a story about the ups and downs of love and "self image in a time when youth has become a painfully self-aware experience". Neive McCarthy of Dork called the album a love letter to the complexity of feelings and said that Renforshort "navigates growing up in all its different hues". For The Line of Best Fit, Ims Taylor said Renforshort "takes us on a winding journey through her coming-of-age psyche, mixing genres and pulling from unexpected places to put the narrative of Dear Amelia together".

With the songs "I Miss Myself", "Hate the Way You Love Me", and "I Thot You Were Cool", the story of Dear Amelia begins as "starting off light" and builds up to the song "Julian, King of Manhattan". Renforshort described the song as "the halfway point where the story starts falling over". The latter part of the album's storyline takes a darker turn. Renforshort described the songs' subject matter changing from "surface-level relationship troubles" to "I just want somebody to tell me that I'm OK because I don't know if I am. I don't know anything about myself anymore". The album closes with Amelia "crack[ing] under it all and disappear[ing]".

=== Songs ===
The opening track of Dear Amelia is "I Miss Myself", which contains simple guitar strumming, a soft piano, and emotional vocals. With lyrics compared to Avril Lavigne, the song is about Renforshort losing herself in a messy relationship. "Made for You" is a soft pop and alt-pop track about changing who you are to match someone else's standards. Greta Brereton of NME wrote that while it is "filled with bright melodies and sweet vocals" and a "bubbly track" on the surface, "the lyrics convey a darker story". The guitar riffs in "Moshpit" were compared to that of Beabadoobee, and is a "sunny, mellow cut" according to Taylor. The alt-pop track is about being treated poorly in a bad relationship and wanting to leave, but also not wanting to hurt the other person's feelings. Its title is a metaphor for the havoc of a bad relationship. The pop rock "Hate the Way You Love Me" is about a "boyfriend who is nice to everyone but her" according to DIY's Cordelia Lam. The indie pop "We'll Make This OK" is a collaboration with Barker and blends guitar riffs with "video game synths" according to Taylor. The track reflects on the feelings of a breakup. The alt-pop "I Thot You Were Cool" has an energy that is more intense.

"Don't Come Back" is an emo pop song that has a "sprawling backdrop and gorgeous, ethereal melodies" and was compared to the 1975 and Muna by Taylor. She also called it the "biggest moment" on the album, "emphasising the best bits of both introverted songwriting and stratospheric delivery". The sad and slow ballad "Let You Down" features Bugg and has lyrics that were compared to Olivia Rodrigo by Taylor. "Better Off" is more relaxed in magnitude compared to "Don't Come Back", and "saturated in laidback catharsis". Taylor called it "dark and bubbly". A love letter to the Strokes' frontman Julian Casablancas, "Julian, King of Manhattan" is about Renforshort escaping into a fantasy world because her real life is a mess. Renforshort called it the happiest song on the album. Taylor wrote that the song contains playful hints of the Strokes' sound and leaves "us off with a smile before going into the real closers". She also wrote that the penultimate soft pop track "Not My Friend" and the final track "Amelia" are "a devastating bookend to the album". The latter is a piano ballad with distorted vocals and is "subtly imbued with emotional intensity".

== Release and marketing ==
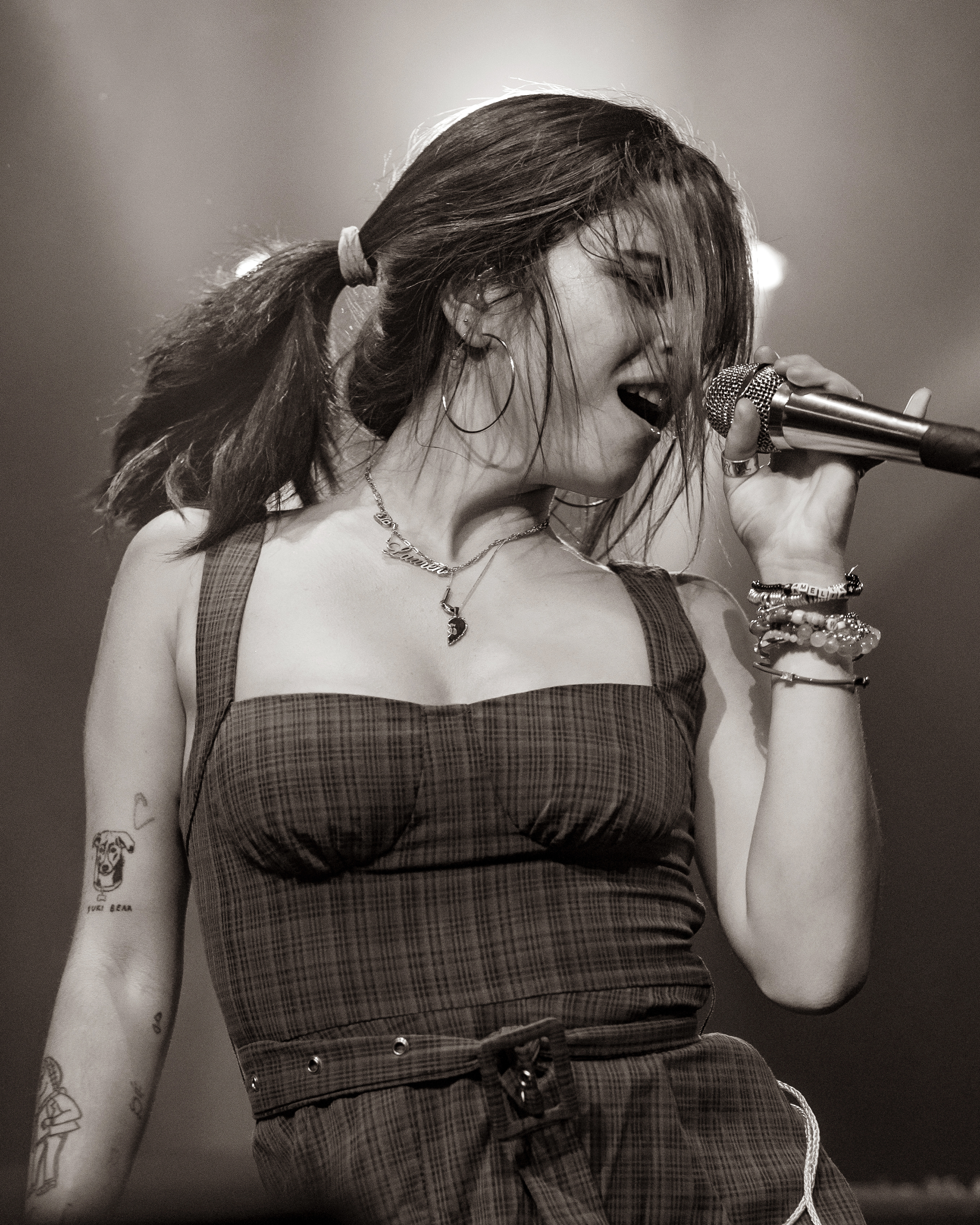
Renforshort performing in Los Angeles during the Dear Amelia Tour (2022)

Dear Amelia's lead single "Moshpit" was released alongside its music video on January 28, 2022. It was followed by "Made for You" and its visualizer on March 31, 2022. Renforshort announced the album, album cover, and track list alongside the single "We'll Make This OK" with Barker and its music video on May 12, 2022. On June 23, 2022, she announced the Dear Amelia Tour across North America, Europe, and Australia along with the single "I Miss Myself". The North American leg took place throughout September and October 2022, with Joey Valence & Brae as a supporting act. Valencia Grace supported the Europe leg, which took place during November 2022. The Australian leg of the tour was supported by Hauskey during July 2023. Renforshort released the fifth and final single "Julian, King of Manhattan" on July 1, 2022. Dear Amelia was released by Interscope Records on July 8, 2022, through digital download, streaming, LP, and CD formats. She also hosted the "Letters to Amelia" initiative, which allowed people to write something they wanted to get off of their chest and mail it to Amelia. The letters would remain anonymous and get discarded after being sent in. Renforshort described it as a "warm-up for therapy and talking about your issues".

== Critical reception ==
Professional ratings
Review scores
Source	Rating
Clash	7/10
DIY	3.5/5 stars
Dork	4/5 stars
The Line of Best Fit	7/10

Dear Amelia received positive reviews from publications. For The Line of Best Fit, Taylor called it the beginning of the next era for Renforshort. Writing for Dork, McCarthy called it a "formidable debut album" and contains a "wealth of intelligent takeaways". Douglas-McCormick from Clash believed "Renforshort makes herself heard" with the album she also "creates things that are important to her; inevitably they'll become important to many others". Taylor, also writing for DIY, wrote that the album has a "distinct, youthful honesty".

Critics enjoyed Renforshort's songwriting in Dear Amelia. Douglas-McCormick wrote that the opening track "I Miss Myself" sets the stage for her unique and touching lyrics. They also believed that none of the songs lack "impressive" emotional depth. McCarthy wrote: "From nursing a friend through hard times to dealing with toxic relationships, each topic is handled with sage wisdom". Taylor thought that Renforshort's "lyricism shines the brightest through the dreamy emo-pop haze she's built in her music". She also believed that the album's best songs are when Renforshort "reins it in". When writing about the album's production, Douglas-McCormick commented that it fell flat on the track "Not My Friend" and both the aforementioned track and "Made for You" sonically "lack the punch of some others on the album".

== Track listing ==
Dear Amelia track listing
No.	Title	Writer(s)	Producer(s)	Length
1.	"I Miss Myself"	Lauren Isenberg; Jeff Hazin; David Pramik	Hazin; Pramik^{[a]}	3:42
2.	"Made for You"	Isenberg; Ian Franzino; Andrew Haas; John Ryan	Afterhrs; Ryan	2:53
3.	"Moshpit"	Isenberg; Alexander Glantz; Hazin	Alexander 23^{[a]}; Hazin^{[a]}	3:39
4.	"Hate the Way You Love Me"	Isenberg; Nick Long; Andy Seltzer	Long; Seltzer	2:53
5.	"We'll Make This OK" (with Travis Barker)	Isenberg; Barker; Hazin; Alden Robinson	Barker; Hazin; Aldn^{[b]}	2:40
6.	"I Thot You Were Cool"	Isenberg; Hazin; Mason Sacks	Hazin; Sacks^{[b]}	2:51
7.	"Don't Come Back"	Isenberg; Long; Tia Scola; Seltzer	Long; Seltzer	2:21
8.	"Let You Down" (featuring Jake Bugg)	Isenberg; Bugg; Jesse Fink; David Charles Fischer; Hazin; Kellen Pomeranz	Hazin; Pom Pom	3:28
9.	"Better Off"	Isenberg; Franzino; Haas; Steph Jones	Afterhrs	3:05
10.	"Julian, King of Manhattan"	Isenberg; Fink; Fischer; Hazin; Pomeranz	Hazin; Pom Pom	2:09
11.	"Not My Friend"	Isenberg; Ari Starace	Y2K	2:47
12.	"Amelia"	Isenberg; Hazin; Pramik	Hazin; Renforshort^{[a]}	3:30
Total length:				35:51

Notes

- ^a signifies a co-producer
- ^b signifies an additional producer
- All tracks are stylized in lower case.

== Personnel ==
Credits adapted from Tidal.

Musicians

- Renforshort – vocals
- Jeff Hazin – drums (3), guitar (3, 5), piano (3), synthesizer (3, 5), bass (5), programming (5)
- Andrew Haas – background vocals (2), drums (2), guitar (2), keyboards (2), programming (2)
- Alexander 23 – background vocals (3), bass (3), drums (3), guitar (3), keyboards (3)
- John Ryan – background vocals (2), bass (2), guitar (2), keyboards (2)
- Aldn – drum programming (5), synthesizer (5)
- Ian Franzino – programming (2)
- Mason Sacks – guitar (6)
- Drew Jurecka – strings (8)
- Y2K – guitar (11)

Technical

- Jeff Hazin – mixing (1, 3, 5, 6, 8, 10–12), engineering (3)
- Mitch McCarthy – mixing (2, 9)
- Michael Freeman – mixing (4, 7)
- Jeff Gunnell – assistant recording engineer (2)
- Andrew Haas – engineering (2)
- Ian Franzino – engineering (2)
- Prash "Engine-Earz" Mistry – engineering (2, 3)
- Kevin Brunhober – vocal engineering (3)
