= Riehle =

Riehle is a surname. Notable people with the surname include:

- Ben A. Riehle (1897–1967), American politician
- Friedemann Riehle (born 1959), German conductor
- Helen Riehle (born 1950), American politician
- Richard Riehle (born 1948), American actor
