= The Sixsters =

Ukrainian rock band from Ukraine

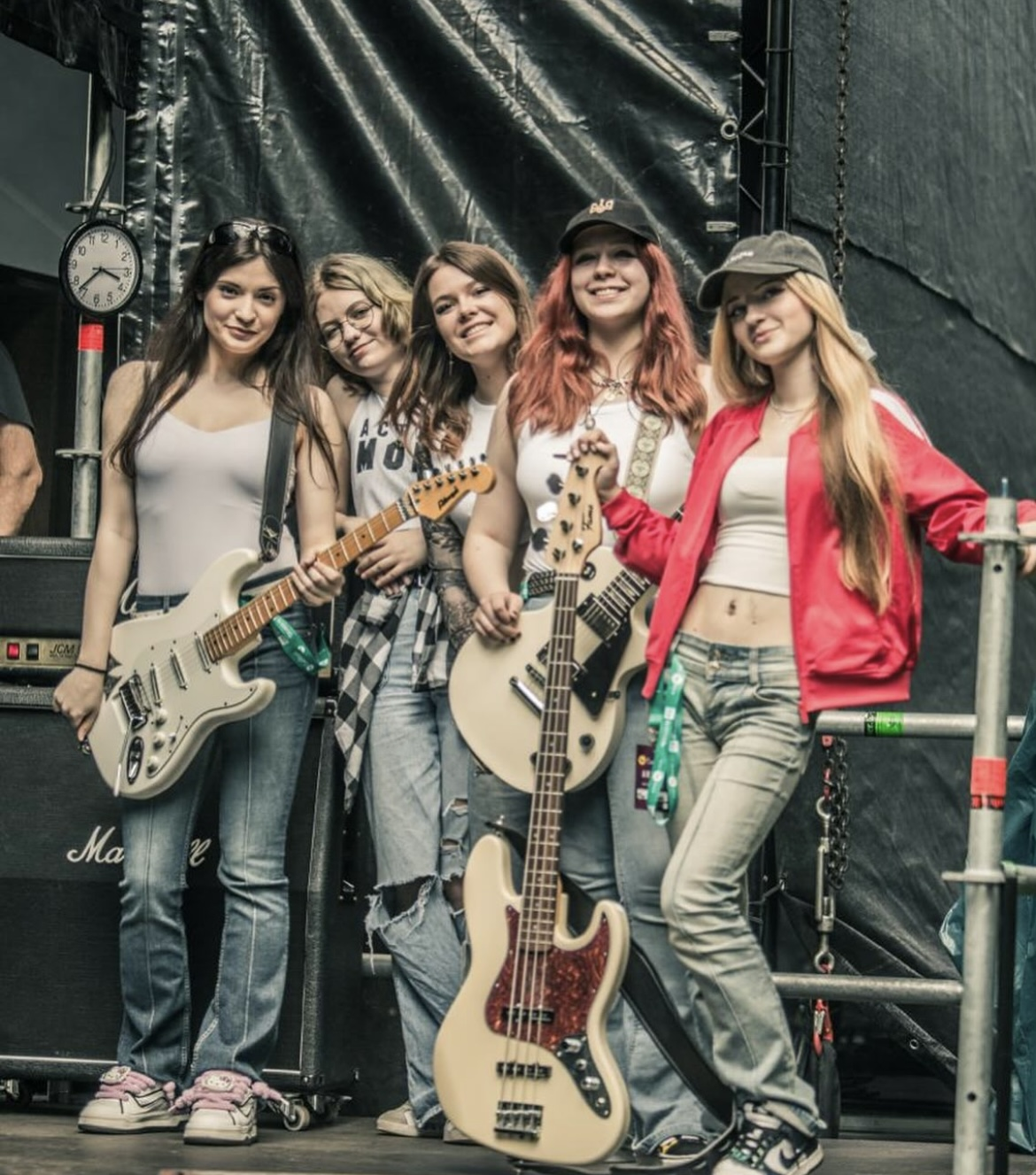

Background information
- Origin: Kyiv, Ukraine
- Genres: Rock; pop rock; art rock
- Years active: 2018–Present
- Label: The Sixsters Family
- Members: Maria Krutsenko; Anna Voloshyna; Katya Kuzyakina; Polina Zagnoi; Sofiia Chernova-Kurlykina
- Website: the-sixsters.com

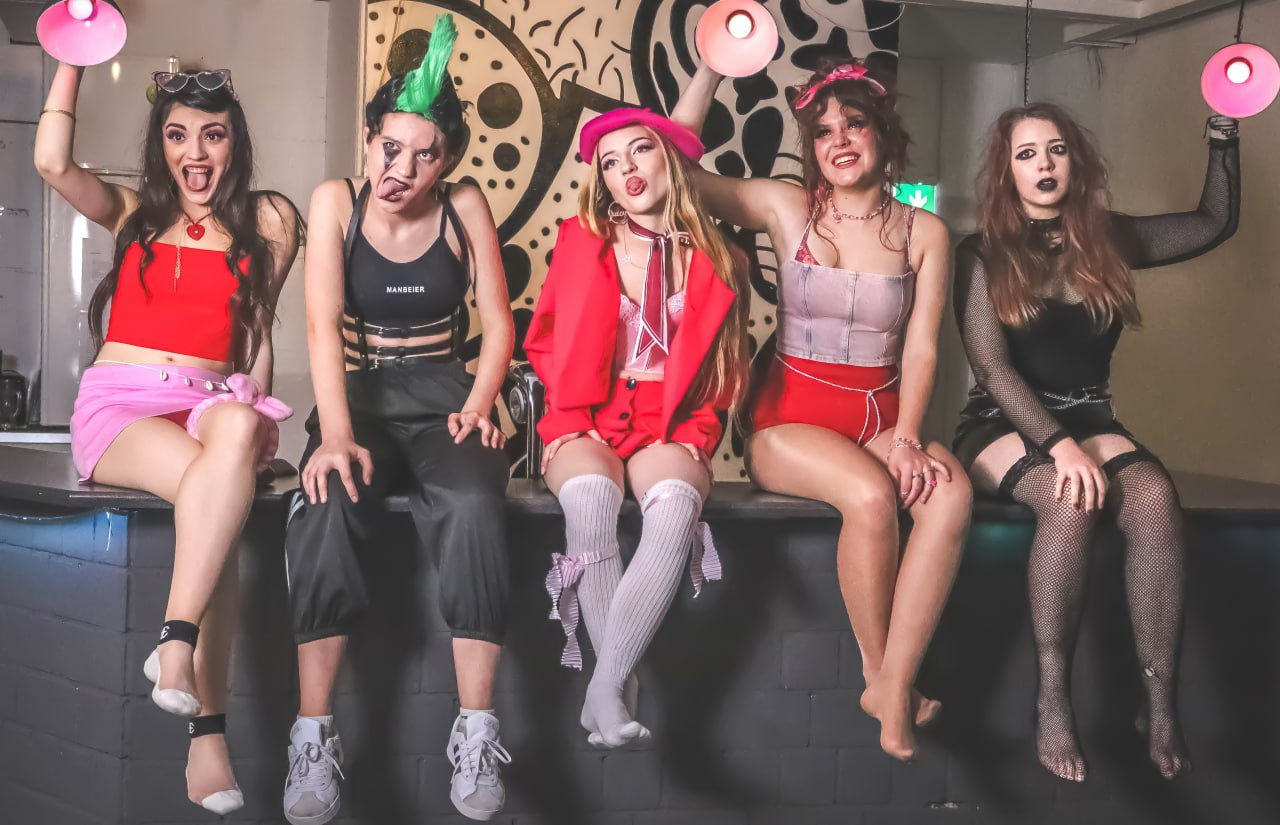
The Sixsters Rock Band

The Sixsters is a rock band founded in 2018 by drummer Kateryna (Kate) Kuziakina in a town near Kyiv. Kate began playing drums at the age of six. Noticing her strong motivation and passion for music, her father, Oleksandr Kuziakin, encouraged the idea of forming a band with other girls who shared a similar enthusiasm. This concept led to the formation of The Sixsters, with Oleksandr later taking on the role of the band's producer and creative lead, supporting the group’s artistic development and direction.

Over a period of four years, the band participated in the Ukrainian rock scene, singing primarily in Ukrainian, but with some English-language songs. The band's name, The Sixsters, originally came from them being an all-female 6-piece, but is now described as "a testament to the close bond shared among the five members" on their website.

In 2022, the Russian invasion of Ukraine significantly affected the band members' lives. Some members left the country early on, while others sought refuge in bomb shelters amidst the conflict. The band members found themselves dispersed across different countries. Despite the uncertainty of the situation, each member held onto the hope of reuniting with the band.

Later in 2022, the members of The Sixsters managed to reunite in Essen, Germany. The band has stated their intent to use their music to raise awareness about the situation in their homeland, including efforts towards providing temporary housing for displaced Ukrainians.

== Musical journey ==
The Sixsters, a rock band, was formed by a group of girls with a shared interest in music. Each member contributed their individual musical style, leading to the creation of songs that combine lyrics with punk melodies. Initially, The Sixsters' music focused on themes of self-discovery and adolescence. However, with the onset of the war, their music evolved to include songs of protest and societal critique. The band describes their music as a mix of rock genres, with elements of narrative and youthful themes. The Sixsters' music often carries themes of resilience and self-expression, particularly in response to challenging times.

== History ==
=== 2018–2021 ===
At the outset, all band members resided in different cities, but they were united by a shared passion for rock music. Their musical journey began in the spring of 2018 when the girls, aged 7 to 10 at the time, convened for their first rehearsal. The band was founded by then 9-year old Katya Kuziakina, a child drummer already known in Ukraine from talent and drumming competitions, with the help of Ukrainian guitarist Pavlo Gudimov and her father. The band dedicated time to familiarize themselves with each other, rehearse extensively, and develop their unique writing and composing style. They played their first live gig in July 2018 at Chornomorski Ihry festival in Skadovsk.

They also achieved a significant milestone when they won a competition organized by Ukrainian band Antytila. This victory opened up new opportunities and broadened their horizons. A stadium tour with Antytila was initially planned for June 2022, but the war led to a change in these plans.

=== 2022 ===
In February 2022, The Sixsters' plans were disrupted by the Russian invasion of Ukraine. Some band members left the country immediately, while others sought shelter from the conflict. Despite the uncertainty, each member held onto the hope of reuniting.

On February 28, 2022, The Sixsters released an anti-war track titled "Правда" ("Truth"). The song, which includes the phrase "Stop Putin Stop War," was intended to raise awareness about the war and express solidarity with the people of Ukraine. The track was recorded during their last rehearsal before the conflict began on February 24.

By June 2022, after five months of war and displacement across Europe, The Sixsters were able to regroup in Essen, Germany. Peter Peterson, a supporter of the band and affiliated with Future Campus Ruhr in Essen, provided a studio for the band to rehearse. During their first rehearsal in Essen, they composed and recorded a new song titled “Happiness,” expressing their desire for the conflict to end and their wish to return home.

The Sixsters have participated in live stream concerts to aid Ukrainian children affected by the war. These live streams have facilitated the raising of donations and the provision of humanitarian aid to Ukraine. A notable collaboration occurred between Kateryna Kuziakina, the band's drummer, and Sina-Drums, during which they performed "Fever" by The Sixsters on drums, with the aim of raising funds for Ukrainian children. In August 2022, The Sixsters participated in the Open Flair Festival in Eschwege, Germany. Concurrently, they released a single titled “Hold” on August 10, 2022.

On December 15, 2022, The Sixsters launched their first English-language studio album, "I'm Gonna Be" recorded at Future Campus Ruhr. The music video for the title track depicts the band members as dolls in a dollhouse setting. The song's lyrics convey a message of self-determination and resilience. The band performed songs from this album at a fundraising concert for Ukrainian children at Zeche Carl in Essen, Germany, on December 17, 2022.

=== 2023 ===
In January 2023, The Sixsters began the construction of their own music studio. Upon its completion, they recorded their single "Same Kid," which was released on April 25, 2023.

On March 15, 2023, The Sixsters released a new Ukrainian song, "Біжи з вовками" ("Run with the Wolves"). The accompanying music video was filmed in their newly constructed studio. The song is a tribute to Voldymr Bulba, a defender of Ukraine. The song contains themes of resilience and courage. The song and its music video have been well received by their fan base.

The Sixsters have been recognized by the German musical instrument company, "Fame Instruments," which selected them as endorsers. This endorsement is an acknowledgment of their skills and their standing within the music industry. The band has also been featured in an issue of Gitarre & Bass magazine, under the headline: "The Sixsters: Ukrainian Riot Girls!" Later in 2024, The Sixsters reached #18 on the German Metal Rock Charts (MRC), reflecting their growing recognition within the German rock and alternative scenes.

In June 2023, The Sixsters reached a major milestone in their international presence by performing at the Glastonbury Festival in the United Kingdom. As one of the most well-known music festivals in the world, Glastonbury brought together artists from across genres and countries. The Sixsters shared the lineup with established acts such as Måneskin, Foo Fighters, Elton John and Slowdive, presenting their material to a diverse and global audience. Their appearance at Glastonbury marked not only a step forward in their touring experience, but also introduced the band to new listeners outside of Eastern Europe. Performing their English-language material in front of an international festival crowd allowed them to further develop their live presence and strengthen their connection with audiences beyond their home country. That same month, The Sixsters also took part in the Come Together Festival in London, continuing their engagement with UK-based music events.

=== Since 2024 ===
In February 2024, The Sixsters released their single "Feels". On 22 February the band released another single "I stare at you..." Two singles are included in their new album To be continued... which was released on 1 March 2024.

In 2024, The Sixsters were selected as Fair Play Ambassadors by Jeunesses Musicales International (JMI), joining a global network of young artists committed to using music as a tool for social change. As part of this role, the band has participated in several international initiatives and forums aimed at promoting fairness, anti-corruption, and youth empowerment through the arts. Their involvement included appearances at the International Anti-Corruption Conference (IACC), the Break Free Festival of Activism, Music and Cinema, and two major youth events in 2025: the EYE2025 (European Youth Event) at the European Parliament in Strasbourg, and the JMI EQ Youth Training and Global Conference in Debrecen, Hungary. A particularly symbolic moment took place during their performance at the Break Free Festival of Activism, Music and Cinema in Lukiškės Prison, Lithuania, where the band played in a decommissioned prison space—turning a place once associated with confinement into a platform for artistic freedom and dialogue. The Sixsters see their ambassador role not only as a recognition, but as a responsibility to advocate through their music. They actively use their performances and platforms to spread awareness about justice, freedom of expression, and youth empowerment, believing that music is a powerful way to connect with and inspire people across borders.

In autumn 2024, The Sixsters performed as the support act for Beatsteaks in Munich and Vienna, playing in front of more than 7,000 people at each show. This marked a major step forward in the band’s live performance experience and allowed them to reach new audiences in Europe.

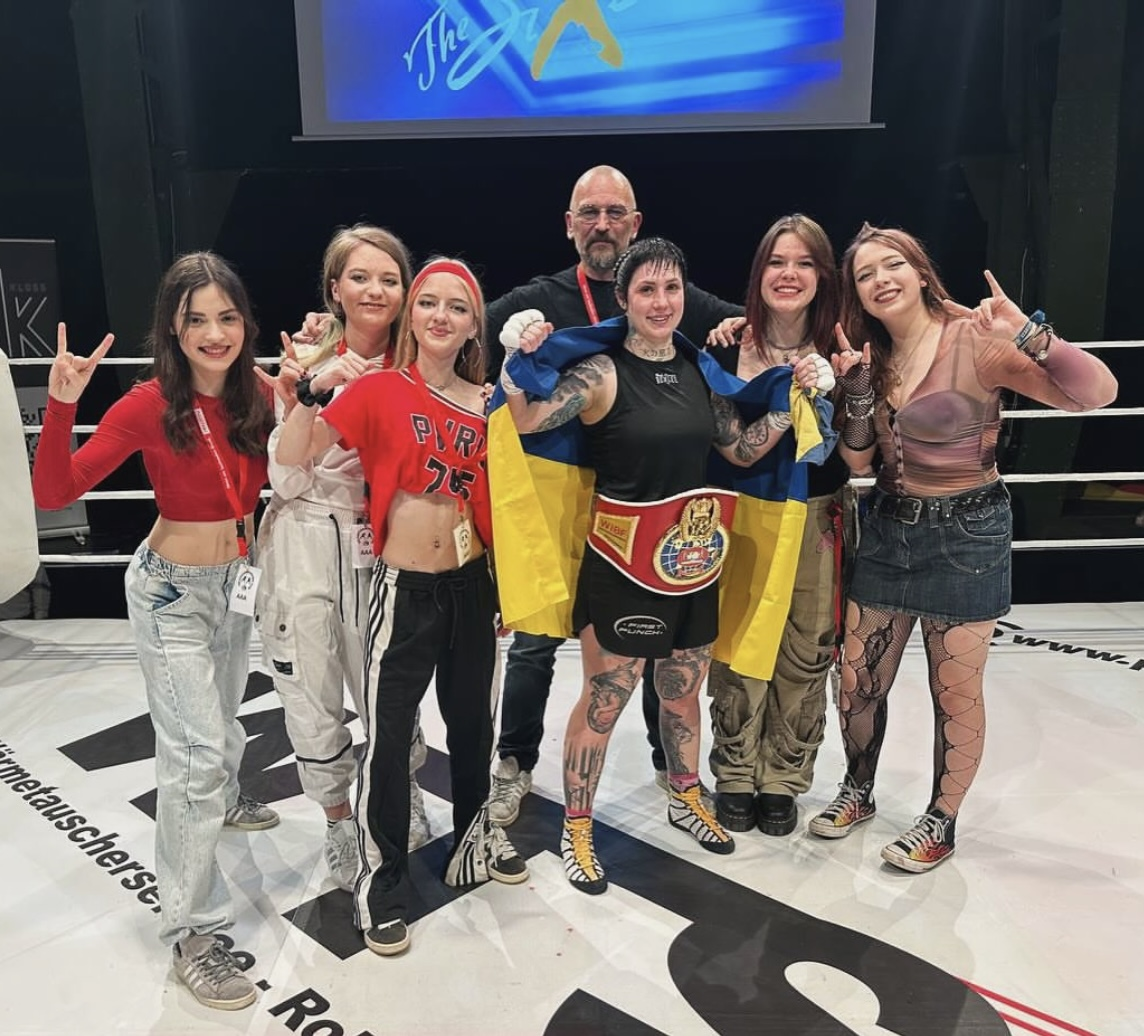
The Sixsters, Oleksandr Kuziakin and Maryna Malovana at Box Gala in Essen, Weststadthalle 2024

In October 2024, The Sixsters expanded their creative reach by stepping into the world of professional boxing. The band wrote and premiered a new anthem, One Way, for a special charity box gala held on 25 October 2024 at the Weststadthalle in Essen, Germany. The event featured Ukraine’s multi-time boxing champion Maryna Malovana, known by her ring name “Dark Angel.” For her entrance to the ring, Malovana chose The Sixsters’ earlier single Evening Fire, whose powerful energy set the tone for her victorious performance. The collaboration marked a distinctive fusion of music and sport, celebrating Ukrainian talent and strength in both arenas. The band’s specially written song, One Way, was described as a bold, driving anthem that embodies resilience and determination — values shared by both The Sixsters and Malovana.

== Musical style and influences ==
The Sixsters incorporates elements of punk, pop rock, alternative rock, and indie rock into their music. Their genre is characterized by a blend of energetic and melodic sounds, with a focus on driving guitar riffs, punchy drum beats, and memorable choruses. The band's music is a fusion of various styles, contributing to their distinctive sound. All band members are well versed on their instruments considering their young ages.

== Band members ==
- Mariia Krutsenko: lead vocals, rhythm guitar (born in Kyiv, Ukraine)
- Anna Voloshyna: lead guitar, backing vocals (born in Poltava, Ukraine)
- Sofiia Chernova-Kurkykina: keyboards, backing vocals (born in Kharkiv, Ukraine)
- Kateryna Kuziakina: drums, backing vocals (born in Simferopol, Ukraine)
- Polina Zagnoi: bass guitar, backing vocals (born in Luhansk, Ukraine)

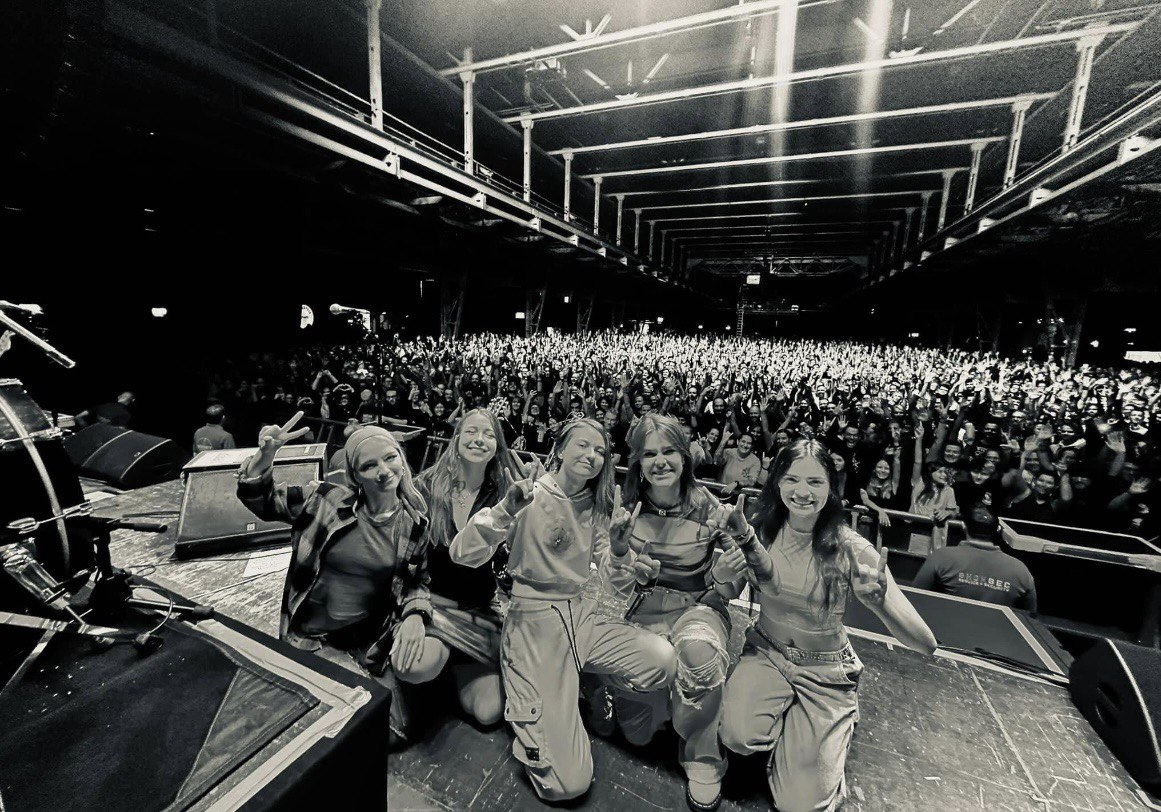
The Sixsters Munich Performance

== Discography ==
The Sixsters have independently released five albums. Their debut album, 'Svit' (translated as 'World' in English), was released in 2020 and includes six tracks, one of which is 'Volcanoes, I Vote.' Their second album, 'Etudy' (translated as 'Etude' in English), was released in 2021. In 2022, they released their first English-language studio album, 'I'm Gonna Be,' which includes the single 'Hold'. In the same year, they also released a single titled 'Правда' ('Truth'), which carries an anti-war message. Their second English-language studio album, "To be continued..." was released on 1 March in 2024, which includes singles "Feels" and "I stare at you...". In April 2026, marking the band’s 8th birthday, The Sixsters released their 5th album “Ghost”, which included the two songs “Plastic She” and “Fame”, that had already been released many months before the album.

=== Albums ===
- "Svit" (January, 2021)
- "Etudy" (November, 2021)
- "I'm Gonna Be" (December, 2022)
- "To be continued..." (March, 2024)
- "Ghost" (April, 2026)

=== Singles ===
- "Правда" ("Truth")(February, 2022)
- “Hold” (August, 2022)
- "Same Kid" (April, 2023)
- "Feels" (February, 2024)
- "I stare at you..." (February, 2024)
- "Everything I owned" (2024)
- "One Way" (October, 2024)
- "Evening Fire" (October, 2024)
- "Plastic She" ( 2024)
- "My Christmas Story" ( 2024)
- "Underground" (June, 2025)
- "No Standards" (July, 2025)
- “Fame” (August, 2025)
- “Half The World” (December, 2025)
- “Alone” (May, 2026)

=== Music Videos ===
| Song | Year | Producer | Link |
|---|---|---|---|
| "I'm Voting" | 2019 | Oleksandr Kuziakin | 1 |
| "Трампліни" | 2020 | Oleksandr Kuziakin | 2 |
| "Вулкани" | 2020 | Pavlo Hudimov, Oleksandr Kuziakin | 3 |
| "Крила" | 2020 | Oleksandr Kuziakin | 4 |
| "Зараз чи ніколи" | 2020 | Oleksandr Kuziakin | 5 |
| "Психоделіка" | 2020 | | 6 |
| "Fever" | 2021 | The Sixsters Family video production | 7 |
| "Media Minion" | 2021 | Oleksandr Kuziakin | 8 |
| "На каву" | 2021 | Oleksandr Kuziakin | 9 |
| "Hold" | 2022 | Oleksandr Kuziakin | 10 |
| "I'm gonna be" | 2022 | Oleksandr Kuziakin | 11 |
| "City" | 2023 | Oleksandr Kuziakin | 12 |
| "Run with the Wolves" | 2023 | Oleksandr Kuziakin | 13 |
| "Happiness" | 2023 | Oleksandr Kuziakin | 14 |
| "Same Kid" | 2024 | Oleksandr Kuziakin | 15 |
| "Everything I owned" | 2024 | Oleksandr Kuziakin | 16 |
| "Plastic She" | 2024 | Oleksandr Kuziakin | 17 |
| "Underground" | 2025 | Oleksandr Kuziakin | 18 |
| "No Standards" | 2025 | Oleksandr Kuziakin | 19 |
| "Fame" | 2025 | Oleksandr Kuziakin | 20 |
| "Half The World" | 2026 | Oleksandr Kuziakin | 21 |
| "Alone" | 2026 | Oleksandr Kuziakin | 22 |
| "Wings" | 2026 | Oleksandr Kuziakin | 23 |

=== Radio ===
- Indie Radio
- Radio Roks
- Ukrainian Radios: Radio Roks, GFM.
- Polish: Radio Poland
- Music Mafia Radio
- UK Radio: Wigwam Radio
- Music Control
- Collegeradio
- Radio BOB
- Classic Rock Radio
- Tide. Radio
- Radio Diabolus
- Dragonland Radio
- Querfunk
- Radio MusicStar
- Rautemusik.fm
- Rockradio.de

=== Live performances ===
- July 29, 2018 – 16th Festival "Chornomorski Ihry" in Skadovsk
- September 23, 2018 – Cover Rock Fest in Kyiv
- December 25, 2018 – Grand Christmas concert at Kontraktova Square in Kyiv
- January 2, 2019 – New Year concert at Sofiivska Square in Kyiv
- June 22, 2019 – Stihl Cup in Khmelnytskyi
- July 27, 2019 – Faine Misto Festival in Ternopil
- August 18, 2019 – Zaxidfest
- July 17, 2021 – Taras Bulba Fest
- August 31, 2021 – Koktebel Jazz Festival: Arabatka 2021
- August 2022 – Open Flair in Eschwege, DE
- December 17, 2022 – Essen DE, Fundraiser For Ukraine, Zeche Carl
- January 7, 2023 – Wetzlar Stadthalle, DE
- May 12, 2023 – Essen Original Festival, DE
- May 17, 2023 – Bielefeld Festival, DE
- June 23, 2023 – Glastonbury Festival 2023
- June 21, 2024 – Lukiskes Prison, Vilnius Lithuania, Break Free Festival of Activism, Music and Cinema.
- September 25, 2024 – w/ Beatsteaks Arena Wien, Austria
- September 26, 2024 – w/ Beatsteaks Zenith Munich, DE
- March 8, 2025 - Berchtesgaden DE, Kuckucksnest
- April 24, 2025 - Essen DE, Chopper Schuppen
- May 3, 2025 - Friedrichshafen DE, Kulturhaus Caserne, Seekult Festival
- May 30, 2025 - Wesel DE, EselRock Festival
- June 7, 2025 - Cologne DE, Groove Bar, Battle Of The Bands
- June 14, 2025 - Strasbourg FR, EYE2025 (European Youth Event) at the European Parliament
- June 28, 2025 - Remscheid DE, Jugendkulturfestival (Open Air)
- July 12, 2025 - Debrecen HU, JMI EQ Youth Training and Global Conference
- July 26, 2025 - Thoronet FR, Les Nuits Blanches Open Air
- August 2, 2025 - Leonberg DE, Warmbronner Open Air
- August 23, 2025 - Seth DE, Ackerbrand Open Air
- August 31, 2025 - Greven DE, Benefiz For Ukraine
- September 12, 2025 - Cologne DE, Groove Bar, w/ Soap Girls
- September 13, 2025 - Witten DE, Feel:leicht Festival (Open Air)
- September 28, 2025 - Cologne DE, Chocolate Museum, Day For Ukraine Fest
- November 28, 2025 - Piding DE, Baamhakke
- November 29, 2025 - Uebersee DE, Freiraum
- December 3, 2025 - Dortmund DE, Westfalenhalle, Damen Handball WM
- December 29, 2025 - Olpe DE, Between The Days Festival
- January 23, 2026 - Wuppertal DE, Die Boerse
