= Clouds (Zach Sobiech song) =

Single by Zach Sobiech
- Released: December 14, 2012
- Recorded: 2012
- Length: 2:59
- Label: Rock the Cause
- Songwriter: Zach Sobiech
- Producer: Karl Demer

Audio sample
- file; help

Music video
- "Clouds" on YouTube

"Clouds" is a song by American singer-songwriter Zach Sobiech. It was his debut and only single released as a solo artist, released digitally on December 14, 2012, and later included on his debut EP, Fix Me Up (released under his band name, A Firm Handshake).

Proceeds from the sale of "Clouds" go to the Zach Sobiech Osteosarcoma Fund, which is a branch of the Children's Cancer Research Fund.

In the United States, "Clouds" sold 25,000 units before Sobiech's death, and an additional 30,000 units on his death date. In total, he had sold 156,000 copies of "Clouds" upon his Hot 100 entry, and has since accumulated 20 million views on YouTube. The single charted in the US, the UK, Canada, France and Belgium.

== Background ==
At age 14, Sobiech was diagnosed with osteosarcoma, a bone cancer that mostly affects children. In May 2012, Sobiech's doctors informed him that he had up to a year to live. Sobiech recorded the song "Clouds" about his battle with cancer.

== Release and promotion ==
Sobiech released it as a YouTube video in December 2012. It went viral, surpassing 3 million views at the time of his death in May 2013. Views had reached 11.8 million by end of November 2013.

Around 30 stars had begun releasing tribute versions of the song. One version was released on SoulPancake, featuring Bryan Cranston, Rainn Wilson, Ashley Tisdale, Colbie Caillat, Anna Faris, Chris Pratt, Jason Mraz, Sara Bareilles, Jenna Fischer, Rachel Bilson, Sarah Silverman, Jason Derulo, Kina Grannis, Paul McDonald, and Phillip Phillips among other celebrities and Sobiech's family and friends lip-synching to "Clouds". This video of artists was assembled by Rainn Wilson, and directed by Justin Baldoni who had also directed a short documentary about Sobiech, titled My Last Days. At the end of the video, Jason Mraz is shown saying, "Thank you Zach. You've written a great song, dude. It's a real pleasure to sing it, and sing it with you. Thank you."

== Legacy ==
=== Clouds ===
On October 16, 2020, Disney+ released the movie Clouds, a musical drama film based upon the memoir Fly a Little Higher: How God Answered a Mom's Small Prayer in a Big Way by Laura Sobiech. The film stars Fin Argus, Sabrina Carpenter, Madison Iseman, Neve Campbell, Tom Everett Scott and Lil Rel Howery.

After the release of the film, the song "Clouds" topped the iTunes song chart at the No. 1 spot a second time, seven years after Zach Sobiech's death. Clouds: A Musical Celebration, a virtual concert was held as a musical tribute on October 24, 2020, with OneRepublic, Fin Argus, Sabrina Carpenter and various members of the Clouds cast participating.

== Credits and personnel ==
Single

- Zach Sobiech: guitar and lead vocals
- Karl Demer: producer/mix engineer – Atomic K Records & Productions
- Merritt Benton: tracking engineer
- John Lynn: piano
- Zach Miller: drums
- Sean O'Hea: bass
- Matt Vannelli: guitar

Music video

- Video and editing: Mike Rominski – Wooly Rhino Productions

== Charts ==
=== Weekly charts ===
Weekly chart performance for "Clouds"
Chart (2013)	Peak position
Belgium (Ultratop 50 Wallonia)	29
Canada (Canadian Hot 100)	14
France (SNEP)	26
Switzerland (Schweizer Hitparade)	73
UK Singles (Official Charts)	50
UK Independent (Official Charts)	8
US Billboard Hot 100	26
US Hot Rock Songs (Billboard)	3

=== Year-end charts ===
Year-end chart performance for "Clouds"
Chart (2013)	Position
US Hot Rock Songs (Billboard)	59

== Awards and nominations ==
- Upper Midwest Emmy Nomination for Best Music Composition/Arrangement
