= F9 (soundtrack) =

2021 soundtrack album by various artists

F9: The Fast Saga (Original Motion Picture Soundtrack)

Soundtrack album by various artists
- Released: June 17, 2021
- Length: 39:12
- Label: Atlantic
- Producers: Liam Howlett; Andrew Cedar; De'Jour Thomas; Taz Taylor; DJ Chose; AG; Linkon; Tobias Wincorn; FKi 1st; Tariq Beats; Humby; Ricky Luna; Ism; Cxdy; Go Grizzly; Pearl Lion; Invincible; OkTanner; PopNick; JaeGreen; Pyroman; Happy Colors; Nicael; Grady; Rvssian; MJNichols; Karloff Gaitan; The Roommates; Rhondofromjersey; Murci

Singles from F9: The Fast Saga: Original Motion Picture Soundtrack
- 1. "I Won" Released: June 4, 2021; 2. "Fast Lane" Released: June 11, 2021; 3. "Bussin Bussin" Released: June 18, 2021

F9: The Fast Saga (Original Motion Picture Soundtrack) is the soundtrack album to the 2021 film, F9. The soundtrack was released by Atlantic Records on June 17, 2021, eight days before the film's theatrical release. To promote the soundtrack, two singles were released for it; the first one was "I Won" and the second one, "Bussin Bussin". It was then followed by four promotional singles.

== Singles ==
The first single for the album, "I Won", was released on June 4, 2021. The single is performed by Ty Dolla Sign, Jack Harlow and 24kGoldn. The second single, "Fast Lane", was released on June 11, 2021, performed by Don Toliver, Lil Durk, and Latto. The third single, "Bussin Bussin" by Lil Tecca, was released on June 18, 2021. Four promotional singles were released on the same day the second single was released; "Furiosa", performed by Anitta, "Bushido" by Good Gas and JP the Wavy, "Mala" by Jarina de Marco and "Exotic Race" by Murci featuring Sean Paul and Dixson Waz.

== Track listing ==
F9 track listing
No.	Title	Writer(s)	Producer(s)	Length
1.	"Fast Lane" (Don Toliver, Lil Durk and Latto)	Caleb Zackery Toliver; Bryan Williams; Norman Payne; Byron Thomas; Ivory Scott; Altariq Crapps; Alyssa Stephens; Jordan Douglas; Tyshane Thompson; Durk Banks; Jocelyn Donald	PopNick; DJ Chose; Tariq Beats	2:52
2.	"Lane Switcha" (Skepta and Pop Smoke featuring ASAP Rocky, Juicy J and Project Pat)	John Mitchell; Cody Rounds; Danny Snodgrass Jr.; Jim Lavigne; Patrick Earl Houston; Jordan Houston; Tanner Katich; Joseph Adenuga; Maxwell James Nichols; Bashar Barakah Jackson; Rakim Athelaston Mayers	Taz Taylor; Cxdy; OkTanner; MJNichols	2:48
3.	"Hit Em Hard" (Offset, Trippie Redd, Kevin Gates, Lil Durk and King Von)	Kevin Gates; Kiari Cephus; Andrew Cedar; Michael White; Ishmael Sadiq Montague; Kevin Gates; Brian Collins; Durk Banks	Cedar; ISM	2:43
4.	"I Won" (Ty Dolla Sign, Jack Harlow and 24kGoldn)	Dazmiere Jones; Golden Landis Von Jones; Gradon Lee; Jackman Thomas Harlow; Jake Troth; Tyrone William Griffin Jr.; Vince Watson	Grady; Invincible	2:55
5.	"Rapido" (Amenazzy, Farruko, Myke Towers and Rochy RD)	Aderli Oviedo; Humberto Viana; José Daniel Betances; Nicael Arroyo; Ronal Toro; Jose E. Luna; Edgar Machuca; Jose Mazo; Carlos Reyes-Rosado; Michael Torres; Edgar Machuca; Gilbert Rodriguez; Lincoln Castañeda; Jose Nicael Arroyo	Humby; Nicael; Ricky Luna; Linkon	2:33
6.	"Breathe (Liam H and René LaVice Re-Amp)" (The Prodigy featuring RZA)	Keith Palmer; Robert Diggs; René LaVice; Keith Flint; Liam Howlett	Howlett	2:29
7.	"Real" (Justin Quiles, Dalex and Konshens)	Garfield Spence; Pedro David Daleccio; Hector Mendoza; Justin Quiles; Karloff Gaitan	Happy Colors; Karloff Gaitan	3:47
8.	"Bussin Bussin" (Lil Tecca)	Nicolas Zita; Tyler-Justin Anthony Sharpe; Rodolfo Argueta; Tarik Johnston	Rvssian; Pyroman	2:20
9.	"Furiosa" (Anitta)	Ale Alberti; Jon Wienner; Tobias Wincorn; Blue Gaillard; Gregory Hein; Sam Homaee	The Roommates; Wincorn	2:33
10.	"Ride da Night" (Kevin Gates, Polo G and Teejay3k)	Jacob Greenspan; Kevin Gates; Taurus Bartlett; Jared Scharff; Kevin Andre Price; Timothy Williams; Jaucquez Lowe	Pearl Lion; Go Grizzly; JaeGreen	2:48
11.	"Bushido" (Good Gas and JP the Wavy)	Braxton Olita; Nvmbrtwntynice; Rhondo Robinson; Michael De'Jour Thomas; Sentaro Irizato; Braxton Olita; Troncon Markous Roberts, Jr.; JP the Wavy	De'Jour Thomas; RhondofromJersey; FKi 1st	3:13
12.	"Speed It Up" (NLE Choppa featuring Rico Nasty)	Maria Kelly; Bryson Potts; Kevin Andre Price	Go Grizzly	2:23
13.	"Mala" (Jarina De Marco)	Jarina De Marco; Adrianne Gonzalez	AG	2:20
14.	"Exotic Race" (Murci featuring Sean Paul and Dixson Waz)	Sean Paul Henriques; Nyann News Lodge; Jason Henriques; Murci; Wascar Moya	Murci	3:21
Total length:				39:12

=== Japanese bonus tracks ===
No.	Title	Length
15.	"One Shot" (YoungBoy Never Broke Again featuring Lil Baby)
16.	"Convertible Burt" (Tory Lanez and Kevin Gates)
17.	"Phantom" (Allen Mock and Chow Chow)
Total length:		47:57

== Charts ==
Chart performance for F9 soundtrack
Chart (2021)	Peak position
Australian Albums (ARIA)	29
Japanese Albums (Oricon)	11
Swiss Albums (Schweizer Hitparade)	90
UK R&B Albums (Official Charts)	12

== F9: The Fast Saga (Original Motion Picture Score) ==
F9: The Fast Saga (Original Motion Picture Score)

Film score by Brian Tyler
- Released: July 2, 2021
- Length: 114:16
- Label: Back Lot Music
- Producer: Brian Tyler

Brian Tyler chronology
Those Who Wish Me Dead (2021)	F9: The Fast Saga (Original Motion Picture Score) (2021)	Escape Room: Tournament of Champions (2021)

F9: The Fast Saga (Original Motion Picture Score) is the film score album of the 2021 film of the same name. The score was released by Back Lot Music on July 2, 2021, with a total of 44 tracks, and 114 minutes and 16 seconds of music. The score was written and composed by Brian Tyler, who also wrote and composed the musical score for the third, fourth, fifth, seventh and eight installments.

=== Track listing ===
All music composed by Brian Tyler.

No.	Title	Length
1.	"Fast 9"	2:48
2.	"Fallen"	2:24
3.	"Visions of the Past"	3:50
4.	"Upward Movement"	2:44
5.	"Tracking Nobody"	2:53
6.	"Enjoying the Moment"	3:30
7.	"Reconciliation"	2:23
8.	"Diamonds and Emeralds"	2:42
9.	"Awakened"	2:26
10.	"The Race"	2:43
11.	"Innuendo of Character"	2:07
12.	"Pelegrín Minas"	5:36
13.	"Tracking a Ghost"	4:00
14.	"Faith"	1:47
15.	"Broken Allegiance"	3:53
16.	"Brother"	1:46
17.	"Transitions"	2:41
18.	"Plans Within Plans Within Plans"	4:12
19.	"The Next Chapter"	5:18
20.	"Peace In the Chaos"	1:52
21.	"Turning the Screws"	3:12
22.	"Twinkie, Ding Dong, And Snowball"	1:27
23.	"This Is My World"	3:24
24.	"Car vs. Jet"	1:00
25.	"Security Breach"	3:53
26.	"Risk"	1:15
27.	"I Got Next"	1:54
28.	"Minions"	0:56
29.	"Student Driver"	2:43
30.	"Hope For the Future"	2:49
31.	"Simple Words"	2:33
32.	"Seeking Jakob"	1:10
33.	"Double Crossed"	2:28
34.	"Reunion"	1:20
35.	"Numbers Don't Lie"	3:02
36.	"Belly Up"	2:54
37.	"Promises"	0:51
38.	"Math and Science"	0:48
39.	"Connections"	2:48
40.	"Punching Bag"	1:10
41.	"Magneticism"	3:02
42.	"Project Aries"	2:22
43.	"Dom vs. Cipher"	3:25
44.	"Toretto"	2:14
Total length:		1:54:16
