= Those Who Wish Me Dead (soundtrack) =

Those Who Wish Me Dead (Original Motion Picture Soundtrack)

Film score by Brian Tyler
- Released: May 7, 2021
- Recorded: 2020–2021
- Genre: Film score
- Length: 62:11
- Label: WaterTower Music
- Producer: Brian Tyler

Brian Tyler chronology
Clouds (2020)	Those Who Wish Me Dead (2021)	F9 (2021)

Those Who Wish Me Dead (Original Motion Picture Soundtrack) is the soundtrack to the 2021 film of the same name directed by Taylor Sheridan. Featuring musical score composed by Brian Tyler, the soundtrack was released by WaterTower Music on May 7, 2021.

== Development ==
"We had this challenge of doing something that was very emotional but has a lot of heartache in it. There is aspiration and regret and melancholy and danger and love and loss and all these things within the score that's really this triangulated suspense movie. But it's really the story of this boy and this woman that both have all these regrets and loss in their life, that they now are fighting against, not only man and like the evils of man, but also the indifference of nature and fire."

— Brian Tyler

Tyler has previously worked with Sheridan on the Paramount Network television series Yellowstone. Sheridan claimed that "Brian has done many big films—really massive set-piece movies [...] With this film, we wanted the score, the sound design, and the sounds of fire to blend together and leave the audience unsure whether it was being guided by a designed sound, by the sounds of the forest or by the score." Tyler discussed on how the two main characters are lost souls searching for deliverance, where "Hannah is a prisoner of her own guilt and memory, while Connor is battling a tragic loss. But this is also a story of human versus nature, as well as the evils of mankind."

In order to channel an array of thematic tones, Tyler recorded the sounds of burning cello set ablaze with a lighter fluid and played the strings until it burned to a point where it made no sound. The recording of the burning cello recurs as a sonic presence throughout the entire score. He further recorded the orchestral sections in different meters, where he would set the bar of woodwinds to 7/8 and the strings to 4/4 but on the same piece, so that it had an asymmetrical rhythmic tempo to it.

Tyler further performed piano solos where the reverb would be out of tune or purposefully detuned from its original sound reminiscent of how the "memories are not actually correct versions of what happened". The piano theme is a melancholic, emotional and heartfelt melody for the two main characters, where instead of having that piano tune, the sustain would be out of tune with itself, with the audience thinking that "this is ugly".

== Track listing ==
No.	Title	Length
1.	"Those Who Wish Me Dead (Main Theme)"	4:05
2.	"Elegy for a Soul"	2:20
3.	"Opus"	5:11
4.	"Lament"	2:36
5.	"Embers"	4:16
6.	"The Beauty of Time"	2:21
7.	"Glimmer of Hope"	1:18
8.	"The Love of a Father"	2:06
9.	"Shadow Mechanics"	7:07
10.	"Presence"	2:35
11.	"Mind Heart Conflation"	3:29
12.	"Lightning Strikes"	5:08
13.	"A Burning Cello"	2:44
14.	"Zero Sum Game"	4:23
15.	"The Calm Inside the Storm"	1:05
16.	"Ultimatum"	7:21
17.	"Those Who Wish Me Dead Finale"	4:06
Total length:		62:11

== Reception ==
Music critic Jonathan Broxton wrote "Those Who Wish Me Dead is a decent score. The intellectual and conceptual ideas behind the score – the interrelated themes and the way Tyler tried to capture the nature of fire itself – are impressive and clearly show him to be a composer very much in tune with his film and what his director needs. The end result, however, doesn't really bear fruit in the same way. The main theme is good, and the action is exciting, but a little too much of it gets lost in the same sort of abstract groaning and electronic sound design that has infected too many of Hans Zimmer's prominent action and sci-fi works of late, to the extent that it doesn't really stand out from the crowd in the way that many of Tyler's earlier scores did." Zanobard Reviews gave 7/10 to the score, summarizing "Brian Tyler's score for Those Who Wish Me Dead is a surprisingly quiet, pensive and richly atmospheric album for the most part, though it doesn't shy away from the composer's well-known epic orchestral talents where they're called upon." David Rooney of The Hollywood Reporter complimented it as "muscular orchestral". Sandy Schaefer of Comic Book Resources wrote "Brian Tyler, working again with Sheridan after their collaboration on Yellowstone, delivers a propulsive, ominous score that further underscores the sense of urgency in Those Who Wish Me Dead."

== Credits ==
Credits adapted from CD liner notes:

- Composer – Brian Tyler
- Producer – Brian Tyler, Joe Lisanti
- Recording – Greg Hayes, Tim Lauber
- Arrangements – Gregory Reveret, John Carey, Josh Zimmerman, Max Lombardo, Nathan Alexander, Sarah Trevino
- Mixing – Brian Tyler, Frank Wolf, Larry Mah
- Music editor – Kyle Clausen
- Supervising music editor – Joe Lisanti
- Technician – Stacey Robinson
- Score co-ordinator – Stephanie Bryant
- Soundtrack co-ordinator – Jen O'Malley
- Music preparation – Eric Stonerook Music
- Art direction – Sandeep Sriram
- Executive in charge of music (New Line Cinema) – Erin Scully
- Executive in charge of music (WaterTower Music) – Jason Linn
- Music business affairs – Ari Taitz

Orchestra

- Orchestra – Brian Tyler, The Hollywood Studio Symphony
- Orchestration – Brad Warnaar, Dana Niu, Robert Elhai
- Conductor – Brian Tyler
- Contractor – Peter Rotter
- Concertmaster – Bruce Dukov
- Stage manager – Damon Tedesco, Hoss Yekband
- Stage engineer – Erin Rettig

Instruments

- Bass – Geoffrey Osika, Michael Valerio, Stephen Dress, Nico Abondolo
- Cello – Armen Ksajikian, Dennis Karmazyn, Eric Byers, Jacob Braun, Paula Hochhalter, Timothy Loo, Vanessa Freebairn-Smith, Steve Erdody
- Clarinet – Stuart Clark
- Flute – Heather Clark, Julie Burkert, Sara Andon
- French Horn – Dylan Hart, Katelyn Faraudo, Laura Brenes, Steven Becknell, Teag Reaves, David Everson
- Trombone – Craig Gosnell, Phillip Keen, Steven Holtman, Alex Iles
- Viola – Alma Fernandez, Andrew Duckles, David Walther, Zach Dellinger, Jonathan Moerschel, Shawn Mann, Victor De Almeida, Robert Brophy
- Violin – Andrew Bulbrook, Benjamin Jacobson, Charlie Bisharat, Eun-Mee Ahn, Helen Nightengale, Josefina Vergara, Lorand Lokuszta, Luanne Homzy, Mark Robertson, Maya Magub, Molly Goldbaum, Natalie Leggett, Phillip Levy, Sara Parkins, Songa Lee, Stephanie Matthews, Tamara Hatwan, Tereza Stanislav, Alyssa Park
