= Sina-Drums =

German drummer living in the United Kingdom

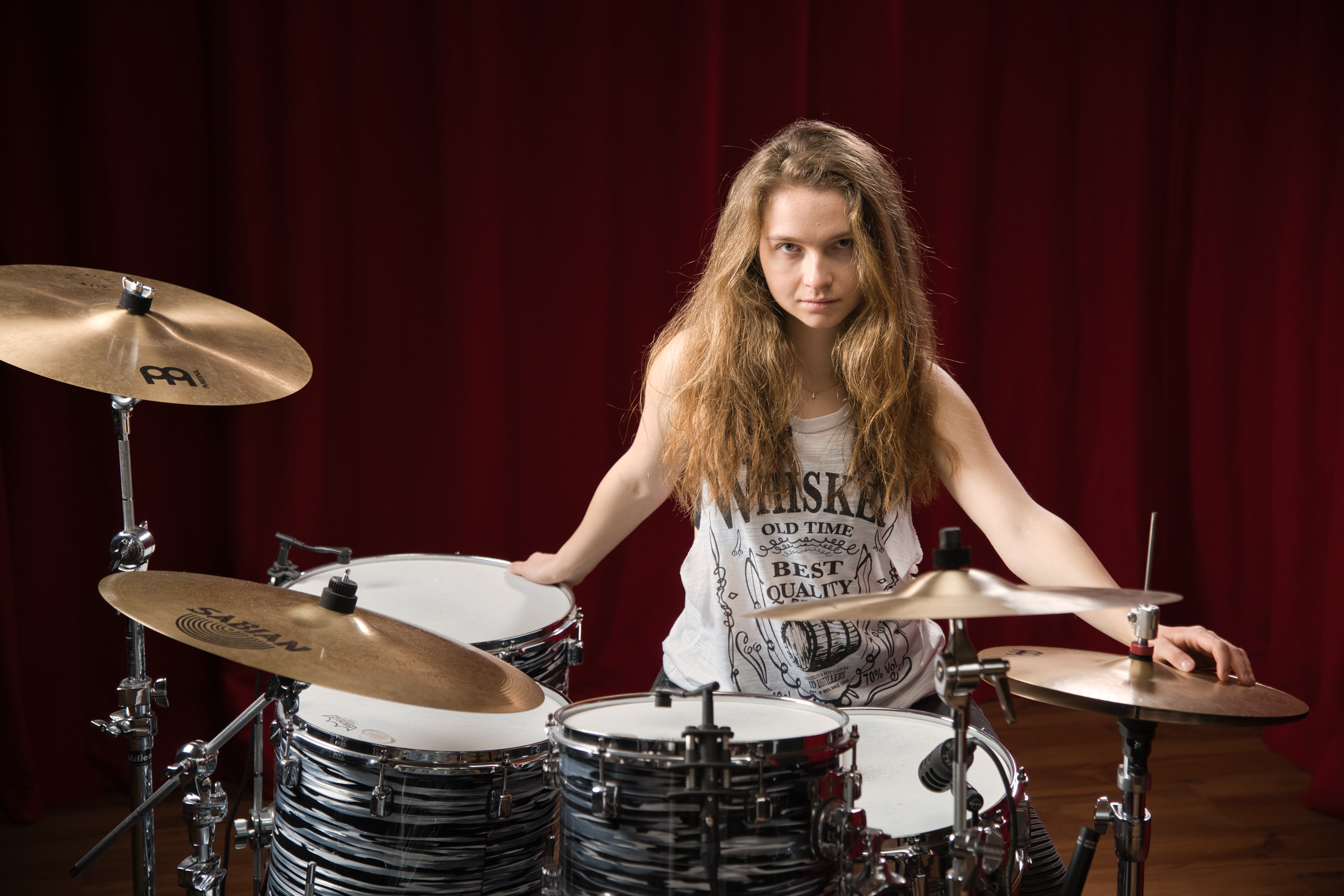
- Sina at her drumset in 2024

Background information
- Also known as: Sina-Drums
- Born: Sina Doering; 6 May 1999 (age 27); Marburg, Germany
- Genres: Rock; hard rock; heavy metal; blues rock; progressive rock; pop; jazz
- Occupations: Drummer; record producer
- Instrument: Drums
- Years active: 2013-present
- Website: www.sinadrums.com

Sina Doering ([ˈziːna ˈdøːʁɪŋ], also written as Sina Döring) is a German drummer known professionally as Sina-Drums. Sina was born on 6 May 1999 in Marburg, Hesse (Germany), and currently lives in London, United Kingdom. In addition to her success as a YouTuber with over 1.93 million subscribers, Sina plays on several albums and has collaborated with internationally known musicians.

== Life and career ==
Sina was born into a musical family in Marburg, Germany. Sina's father, Michael Doering, works as both a live and studio musician and a songwriter and producer under the stage name Mike Wilbury. At the age of two, Sina accompanied her father for the first time on the tour of his Beatles tribute band, The Silver Beatles. When Sina was six years old, her father recorded the children's musical A Toy Soldier in Love, in which she appeared for the first time as an actress in an advertising trailer. Sina began playing drums in 2009 and took regular lessons at the Drummers' Inspiration drum school in Krefeld, Germany between 2009 and 2016.

In 2013, Michael launched Sina's YouTube channel and on the same day uploaded her first drum cover video, in which she drummed to "Metropolis Pt. 1" by Dream Theater. As of 19 July 2024, her YouTube channel, Sina-Drums, had 613 videos, more than 1.8 million subscribers, and over 767 million total views. With the channel, Sina attracted both German and international musical interest. In a 2017 interview, founding member of Chicago Daniel Seraphine described Sina-Drums as "awesome" in reference to her drum cover of Chicago's "25 or 6 to 4".

In 2015, after presenting more drum covers on her channel for a few years, Sina began work on her own album project, which brought together young musicians from all over the world. Lauren Isenberg, who is now known as Renforshort, was involved, among others. In 2016, Sina released the album, titled Chi Might, via Rockwerk Records (a label cooperative of the German Rock & Pop Musicians' Association).

From 2017 to March 2021, Sina was part of hard rock band The Gäs, which played as the opening act for Glenn Hughes and Manfred Mann's Earth Band, among other groups. She also performed on The Gäs's 2017 album Savage.

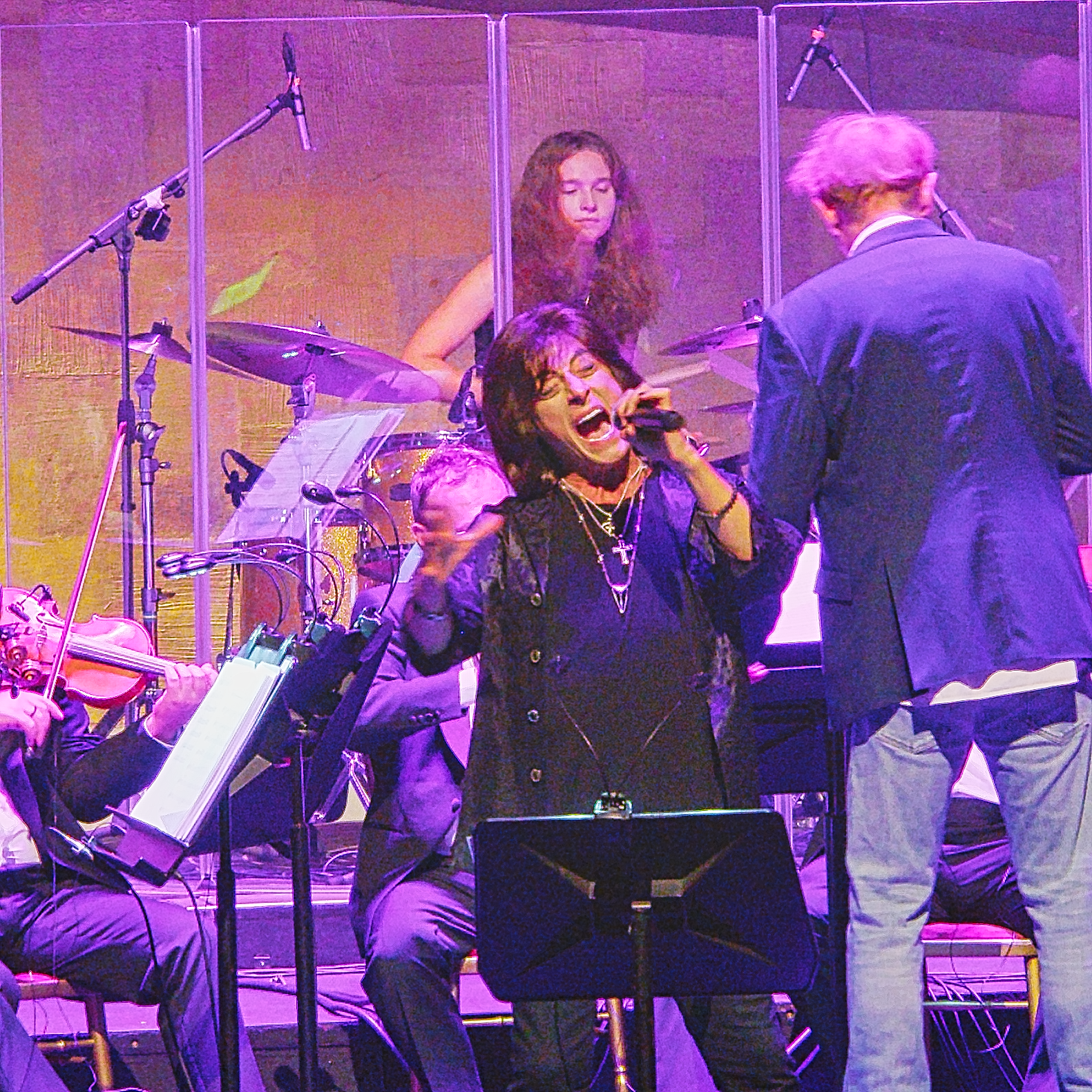
Sina-Drums 2022 with Joe Lynn Turner at Rock the Opera in the Vienna State Opera

Over time, Sina developed a broader reputation as a respected musician and played with well-known musical greats. She was seen on German television in ZDF's Gottschalks große 68er Show with Thomas Gottschalk, where she drummed for the Scottish musician Donovan's performance of his "Hurdy Gurdy Man."

From 2017 to 2018, Sina completed an additional full-time intensive drum course at the Drummers Institute in Krefeld. At the same time, she worked on her second Chi Might album, which she again released on Rockwerk Records.

In 2019, Donovan (with whom Sina had performed on Gottschalks große 68er Show) produced a tribute album to Rolling Stones founding member Brian Jones. That album, titled Joolz Jones & The Jukes, featured Joolz Jones (Brian Jones' grandson) as a singer and Sina as a drummer. The COVID-19 pandemic followed and public appearances were rarely allowed, so Sina used this time to produce her third album Chi Might III, which she self-published in 2020.

In September 2020, Sina began studying jazz and pop at ArtEZ in Arnhem (the Netherlands), where she graduated with a Bachelor's Degree in Jazz & Pop Drums on 10 June 2024. In 2020, Sina drummed for Der Ole's song "Durch die Zeit" on the album of the same name. Ian Paice, British drummer and founding member of the music group Deep Purple, discovered Sina-Drums in 2020, commenting on Sina's drum cover version of Deep Purple's Burn in his own YouTube video channel. In 2021, Paice produced a video with Sina and the Japanese drummer Yoyoka Soma.

Also in 2021, Sina was invited by Jim Peterik of Survivor to play the drums on his song "Dear Life" for the album Tigress: Women Who Rock the World. That year and the year following, Sina was part of Rock the Opera's European tour, where, among other performances, she appeared with Joe Lynn Turner at the Vienna State Opera.

After graduating from ArtEZ in 2024, Sina moved to London.

Since 2025, Sina has been co-directing Boom Studios in Porto, Portugal, alongside Gabriel Suarez and Nils Neumann.

== Discography ==
=== Studio albums ===
- 2016: Chi Might (Rockwerk Records)
- 2019: Chi Might II (Rockwerk Records)
- 2020: Chi Might III (self-published)

=== Featured on ===
- 2019: Joolz Jones & The Jukes (Brian Jones tribute album; produced by Donovan)
- 2017: Savage by The Gäs
- 2020: "Durch die Zeit" on Durch die Zeit by Der Ole
- 2021: Witchdoctor by Sticky Hickey
- 2021: "Dear Life" on Tigress: Women Who Rock the World by Jim Peterik
