= Oleksandr Kuziakin =

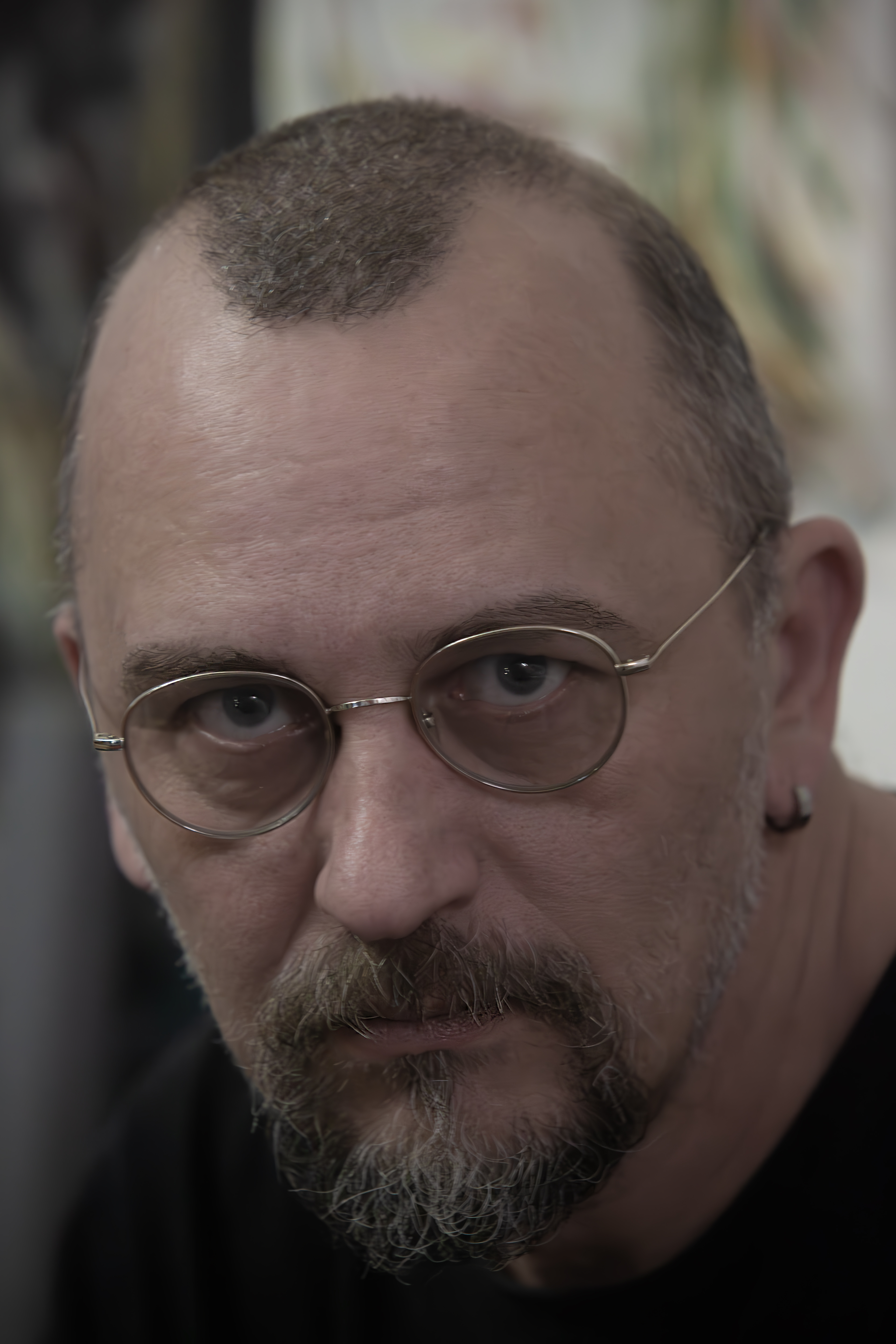
- Oleksandr Kuziakin in his studio, 2024

Background information
- Born: September 12, 1976 (age 49); Kryvyi Rih, Ukraine
- Genres: Rock, hard rock, indie rock, punk rock, alternative rock
- Occupations: producer, engineer, arranger, film director
- Years active: 2000–present
- Website: thesixsters.com

Oleksandr Kuziakin (also known as Alex; born September 12, 1976) is a Ukrainian music producer and film director known for his work across rock music, independent cinema, mostly by working with The Sixsters band. He is the founder of The Sixsters Family label.

== Biography ==
=== Early life and education ===
Oleksandr Kuziakin was born on September 12, 1976, in Kryvyi Rih, Ukraine, into a working-class family. His mother worked as a cook, and his father was a coal miner. He grew up with a younger sister in a family of two children. He studied at Secondary School No. 45 in Kryvyi Rih and later enrolled at the Kryvyi Rih Mining and Economic College, where he specialized in Food Preparation Technology. As a teenager, he began working at a children's summer camp as a youth counselor, a position he held for four years. This experience gave him early exposure to working with children and managing creative projects. From an early age, Alex showed a strong interest in music. He played the guitar and spent hours practicing, often drawing complaints from neighbors who called him "the loud boy upstairs." One of his most vivid childhood memories was listening to music drifting from a neighbor’s balcony — a moment that sparked a deep emotional connection to sound. He was particularly drawn to genres such as rock, punk, alternative rock, and hard rock.

=== Career beginnings ===
In the early 2000s, Alex joined the musical band Aeroplan. According to him, this was the best period of his youth — a time of creative freedom, artistic collaboration, and stage energy. The group eventually disbanded.

Afterward, he began exploring sound engineering, developing a strong interest in the technical side of music production. He later worked at a Center for Children’s Creativity as a group leader for five years, helping children organize events and musical projects. Simultaneously, he performed as an actor in the Youth Theater of Miniatures led by Halyna Kostenko. He also completed military service and later signed a contract to serve in a United Nations peacekeeping mission.

=== Transition to production ===
After completing his military service, Alex moved to Crimea, where he made the final decision to dedicate his life to music and video production. There, he reconnected with former members of Aeroplan and directed a music video for them, which led to his employment at the Ukrainian TV channel STB (Svit TeleBachennia) as a video editor and director. He later founded his own video production company but eventually closed it to focus entirely on a new project involving his daughter.

=== Formation of The Sixsters ===
In 2008, Alex's daughter, Kateryna Kuziakina, was born shortly after the family moved from Crimea to Kyiv. At the age of six, she developed an interest in playing drums and began actively practicing. One of her videos quickly went viral after it was shared by Shirley Manson, lead singer of the band Garbage.

Inspired not only by the unexpected viral attention but also by the spark of passion he saw in his daughter’s eyes, Oleksandr Kuziakin felt compelled to support her growing love for music. Recognizing her dedication and desire to perform, he envisioned a rock band composed of girls who shared that same fire and determination. This led to the creation of The Sixsters, with Alex taking on the role of producer, mentor, and creative lead, committed to guiding the band from its earliest stages.

One of the first people to support the project was Max Ardelyan, chief director of the Tavriyski Ihry music festival. Alex also received technical support from sound engineer Valeriy Likhachov, who helped the band record its early songs in his studio. Another key supporter was Pavlo Hudimov, former guitarist of the band Okean Elzy, who attended early rehearsals, offered guidance, and helped the girls develop their sound. The group also drew praise from drummer Max Malyshchev, who became a fan of Kateryna’s playing.

=== Emigration and life in Germany ===
In 2022, following the outbreak of full-scale war in Ukraine, Oleksandr Kuziakin and his wife, along with their three daughters, first relocated to western Ukraine before being forced to leave the country entirely.

After a long and uncertain journey, the family eventually settled in the industrial city of Essen, Germany. Initially, Kuziakin had planned to move the family to the United Kingdom, but after a conversation with a fan of The Sixsters, he was encouraged to contact a friend named Peter in Germany. Peter not only hosted the family but also offered them access to his recording studio, Future Campus Ruhr, where the band would later record its debut English-language album, "I'm Gonna Be".

One day, Kateryna approached her father and asked, “Dad, is The Sixsters over?” Motivated by her question, Kuziakin set out across Europe to reconnect with each of the band’s members — located in Spain, Switzerland, and Germany — to reunite them for their first rehearsal at Peter’s studio in Essen.

A year later, Oleksandr Kuziakin opened his own professional recording studio in Essen, where he continued to work with The Sixsters and launched new musical projects. It was in this studio that he produced and recorded the band's second full-length studio album, "To Be Continued...", which was then released in 2024.

=== Support and mentorship for young talent ===
Oleksandr Kuziakin actively supports young musicians. He became a jury member for a youth band battle organized by the Kyiv Rock School, the same platform where The Sixsters performed five years earlier.

He has assisted two emerging bands by producing their debut singles and music videos, while also acting as a mentor by sharing his experience in the music industry. One of the bands even traveled to his studio in Germany, where Kuziakin conducted a full recording session and gave them a hands-on workshop in music production.

== Style and influences ==
As a producer and creative director, Alex is known for blending the raw energy of punk rock with the melodic sensibilities of indie and alternative rock. His work with The Sixsters reflects a balance between youthful rebellion and emotional depth, often characterized by driving guitar riffs, fast-paced rhythms, and introspective lyrics. Alex draws inspiration from classic rock acts as well as modern alternative scenes, shaping a sound that is both accessible and authentic. He places strong emphasis on live instrumentation, honest storytelling, and empowering female voices within the traditionally male-dominated rock genre.

== Filmography ==
| Title | Artist | Year | Producer | Video Link |
|---|---|---|---|---|
| I'm gonna be | The Sixsters | 2022 | Oleksandr Kuziakin | 1 |
| For us... For me... | The Sixsters | 2023 | Oleksandr Kuziakin | 2 |
| Same Kid | The Sixsters | 2024 | Oleksandr Kuziakin | 3 |
| My Christmas Story | The Sixsters | 2024 | Oleksandr Kuziakin | 4 |
| Plastic She | The Sixsters | 2024 | Oleksandr Kuziakin | 5 |
| Everything I owned | The Sixsters | 2024 | Oleksandr Kuziakin | 6 |
| I Stare at you | The Sixsters | 2024 | Oleksandr Kuziakin | 7 |
| Feels | The Sixsters | 2025 | Oleksandr Kuziakin | 8 |
| Psychedelic II | The Sixsters | 2025 | Oleksandr Kuziakin | 9 |
| Hurricane in my Soul | The Sixsters | 2024 | Oleksandr Kuziakin | 10 |
| No Standards | The Sixsters | 2025 | Oleksandr Kuziakin | 11 |
| Fallschirmvertrauen | KUULT | 2025 | Oleksandr Kuziakin | 12 |
| Rock 'N' Roll Lifestyle | KUULT | 2025 | Oleksandr Kuziakin | 13 |

== Discography ==
Oleksandr also produced two full-length rock albums by the Ukrainian band The Sixsters — I'm Gonna Be (2022) and To be Continued... (2024), both of which contributed to the group’s rising popularity in the alternative rock scene.

=== Albums Produced ===
| Title | Artist | Year | Role | Notes |
|---|---|---|---|---|
| I'm Gonna Be | The Sixsters | 2022 | Producer, Arranger | Debut English Studio Album |
| To be Continued... | The Sixsters | 2024 | Producer, Arranger | Second English Studio Album |

In addition to full-length albums, Alex also produced a number of singles for The Sixsters, contributing to the band’s growing discography and recognition in the worldwide rock scene.

=== Singles Produced ===
| Title | Artist | Year | Role |
|---|---|---|---|
| Hold | The Sixsters | 2022 | Producer, Arranger |
| Same Kid | The Sixsters | 2023 | Producer, Arranger |
| Seem to Dance | The Sixsters | 2023 | Producer, Arranger |
| For Us, For Me | The Sixsters | 2023 | Producer, Arranger |
| Коля Мажор | The Sixsters | 2023 | Producer, Arranger |
| Feels | The Sixsters | 2024 | Producer, Arranger |
| Hurricane in My Soul | The Sixsters | 2024 | Producer, Arranger |
| Everything I Owned | The Sixsters | 2024 | Producer, Arranger |
| One Way | The Sixsters | 2024 | Producer, Arranger |
| Evening Fire | The Sixsters | 2024 | Producer, Arranger |
| Plastic She | The Sixsters | 2024 | Producer, Arranger |
| My Christmas Story | The Sixsters | 2024 | Producer, Arranger |
| Underground | The Sixsters | 2025 | Producer, Arranger |
| No Standards | The Sixsters | 2025 | Producer, Arranger |
