= Renforshort =

Canadian singer

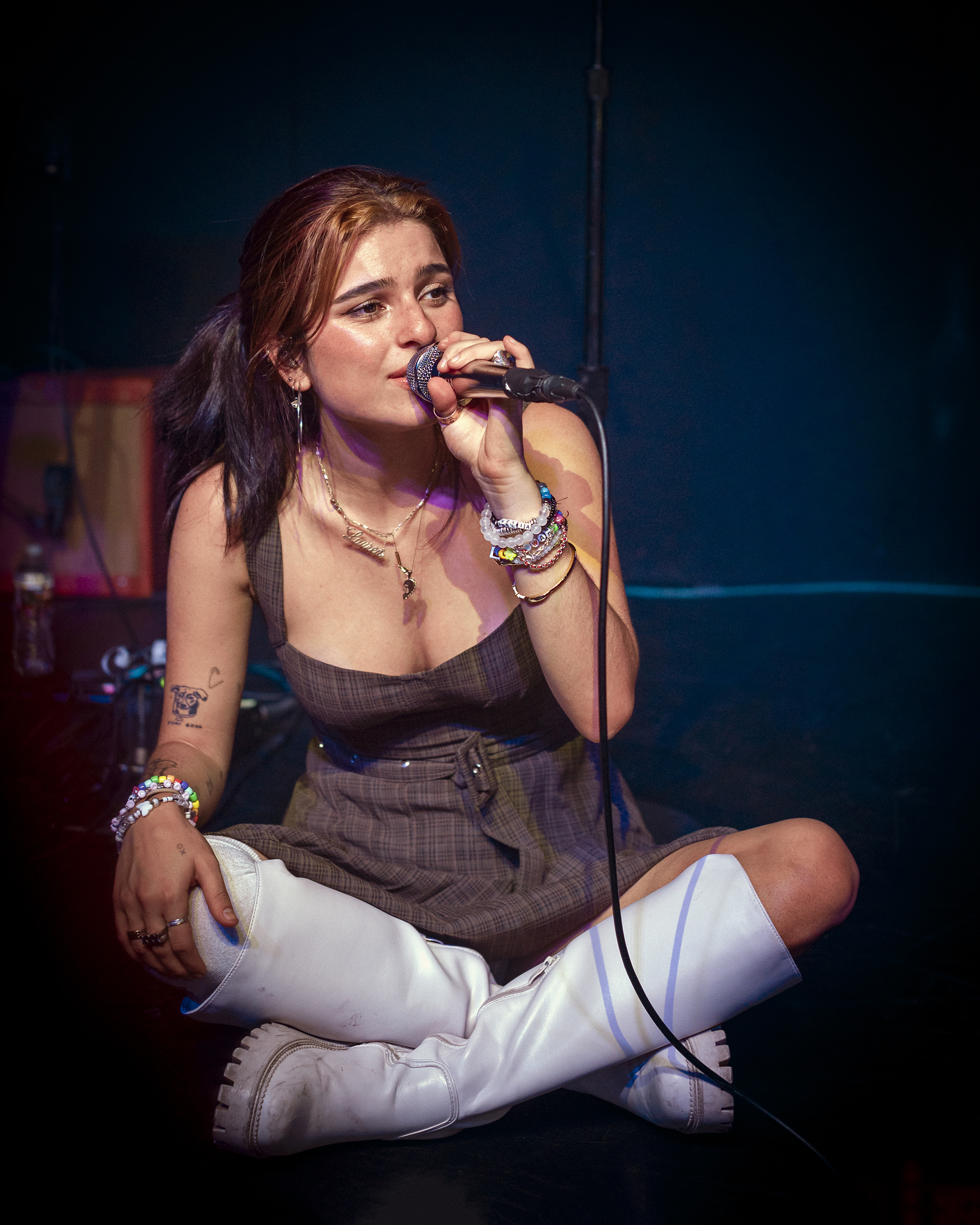
- renforshort performing at Moroccan Lounge, 2022

Background information
- Born: Lauren Isenberg; May 7, 2002 (age 24); Toronto, Ontario, Canada
- Genres: Alternative pop; bedroom pop
- Occupations: Singer; songwriter
- Instruments: Vocals, bass, guitar
- Years active: 2016–present
- Labels: Geffen; Interscope
- Website: www.renforshort.com

Lauren Isenberg (born May 7, 2002), known professionally as Renforshort (stylized as renforshort) is a Canadian singer and songwriter from Toronto. Debuting independently in 2019 with the singles "Waves" and "Mind Games", Isenberg released her debut extended play, the Teenage Angst EP, in March 2020.

== Life and career ==
=== Early life ===
Lauren Isenberg was born in Toronto. Her parents' taste of music influenced her at an early age, and she was exposed to musicians such as Billy Joel, The Velvet Underground and Nirvana. As a child, she won a Chinese language competition for performing the folk song "Mo Li Hua". Isenberg wrote her first song at 13 years old called "Hopeless Town", which was produced by Nathan Ferraro of the Canadian band The Midway State, and worked on several songs in Los Angeles with producer Justin Gray, however decided that none of these songs showed off her full personality. She began posting covers of songs to YouTube and SoundCloud in 2015, starting with a cover of Labrinth's "Jealous". At 14, Isenberg decided that singing was her passion after performing at an open mic night.

Isenberg met Canadian producer Jeff Hazin in 2016, who became her long-time collaborator (Isenberg has continued to work with the same co-writers since 2016). In the same year, she collaborated with German drummer and YouTuber Sina-Drums on her album Chi Might.

=== Debut ===
Under the moniker Ren, Isenberg released her debut single "Waves" in February 2019. Music executives from Geffen Records took notice of her due to the song's popularity, and organized a meeting with her only a month after its release. Isenberg's second single "Mind Games" became a viral hit, and by November the two tracks had amassed five million streams across platforms. "Mind Games" was later nominated for the 2019 SOCAN Songwriting Prize.

Isenberg's first single with Geffen Records was released in November, entitled "IDC". On March 13, 2020, Isenberg released her debut extended play, the Teenage Angst EP, and changed her stage name to Renforshort. The leading single from the release, "I Drive Me Mad", was inspired by Isenberg's experiences with anxiety and panic attacks. Promotion for the EP was difficult, as scheduled showcases in Toronto, New York and Los Angeles were delayed in an effort to flatten the curve against the COVID-19 pandemic. She is a support act on Yungblud's Life on Mars tour.

=== Later works ===
In 2021 Ren released another EP titled Off Saint Dominique EP which was released through Interscope Records on June 4. It was met with positive reviews from critics with NME describing it as " A celebration of ever changing emotion" and publication Dork called the EP as having a "striking take on lyricism that continues to impress with a refreshing level of self-reflection" As of January 2022 the EP has surpassed 15 million streams on Spotify. On the July 8, 2022, she released her debut studio album Dear Amelia which was followed by a tour of North America and the UK/EU shortly afterwards. In this album she dedicated a song to American singer Julian Casablancas, "Julian, King of Manhattan".

== Artistry ==
Renforshort's music is inspired by acts such as Bob Dylan and Amy Winehouse, and from films such as Coraline and Call Me by Your Name.

== Personal life ==
Isenberg's mother is a real-estate agent. She has three brothers.

== Discography ==
=== Studio albums ===
List of studio albums, with selected details
Title	Details
Dear Amelia	Released: July 8, 2022; Label: Interscope; Formats: Digital download, streaming

=== Extended plays ===
List of extended plays, with selected details
Title	Details
Teenage Angst EP	Released: March 13, 2020; Label: Geffen, Renwasn’there Inc, Interscope; Formats: Digital download, streaming
Off Saint Dominique EP	Released: June 4, 2021; Label: Interscope; Formats: Digital download, streaming
Clean Hands Dirty Water EP	Released: May 17, 2024; Label: Renwasn’there Inc, Nettwerk; Formats: Digital download, streaming
Renforshort (Audiotree Live)	Released: February 5, 2025; Label: Audiotree; Formats: Digital download, streaming
A Girl's Experience EP	Released: June 6, 2025; Label: Renwasn’there Inc, Nettwerk; Formats: Digital download, streaming

=== Singles ===
List of singles, showing year released, album name and selected chart positions
Title	Year	Peak positions		Album
Title	Year	CAN CHR	CAN HAC	Album
"Waves"	2019	—	—	Non-album singles
"Mind Games"	2019	—	—	Non-album singles
"IDC"	2019	—	—	Teenage Angst EP
"New Way"	2020	—	—	Teenage Angst EP
"I Drive Me Mad"	2020	—	—	Teenage Angst EP
"Fuck, I Luv My Friends"	2020	—	—	Non-album singles
"Nostalgic (Luvsick)"	2020	—	—	Non-album singles
"AfterThoughts"	2020	—	—	Clouds (Music from the Disney+ Original Movie)
"Feel Good Inc." (featuring Mateus Asato)	2020	—	—	Non-album single
"Virtual Reality"	2021	—	—	Off Saint Dominique EP
"Exception"	2021	—	—	Off Saint Dominique EP
"Fall Apart" (featuring Glaive)	2021	—	—	Off Saint Dominique EP
"Moshpit"	2022	—	—	Dear Amelia
"Made for You"	2022	—	—	Dear Amelia
"Bebe"	2023	—	—	Non-album single
"Serpentine"	2024	—	—	Clean Hands Dirty Water EP
"Hurt Like It Should"	2024	—	—	Clean Hands Dirty Water EP
"Buried Alive" (with PJ Harding)	2024	—	—	Clean Hands Dirty Water EP
"Buried Alive, Again" (with Wrabel)	2024	—	—	Non-album single
"On My Way!"	2024	16	24	A Girl's Experience EP
"Pretend to Like Me"	2025	—	—	A Girl's Experience EP
"Feeling Good"	2025	13	37	A Girl's Experience EP

=== Guest appearances ===
List of guest appearances, with other performing artists, showing year released and album name
Title	Year	Other artists	Album
"Doing the Wrong Thing the Right Way"	2016	Sina-Drums	Chi Might
"While My Guitar Gently Weeps"	2017	Sina-Drums	YourSongBook
"Superstition"	2018	Sina-Drums	Your Songbook II
"Dog Eat Dog"	2021	Aldn	Greenhouse
"Box in a Heart"	2022	The Maine	—N/a

== Tours ==
=== Supporting ===
- The Between Albums Tour (2023) - selected European dates
