= Rock the Opera =

Czech rock orchestra

- Rock orchestra
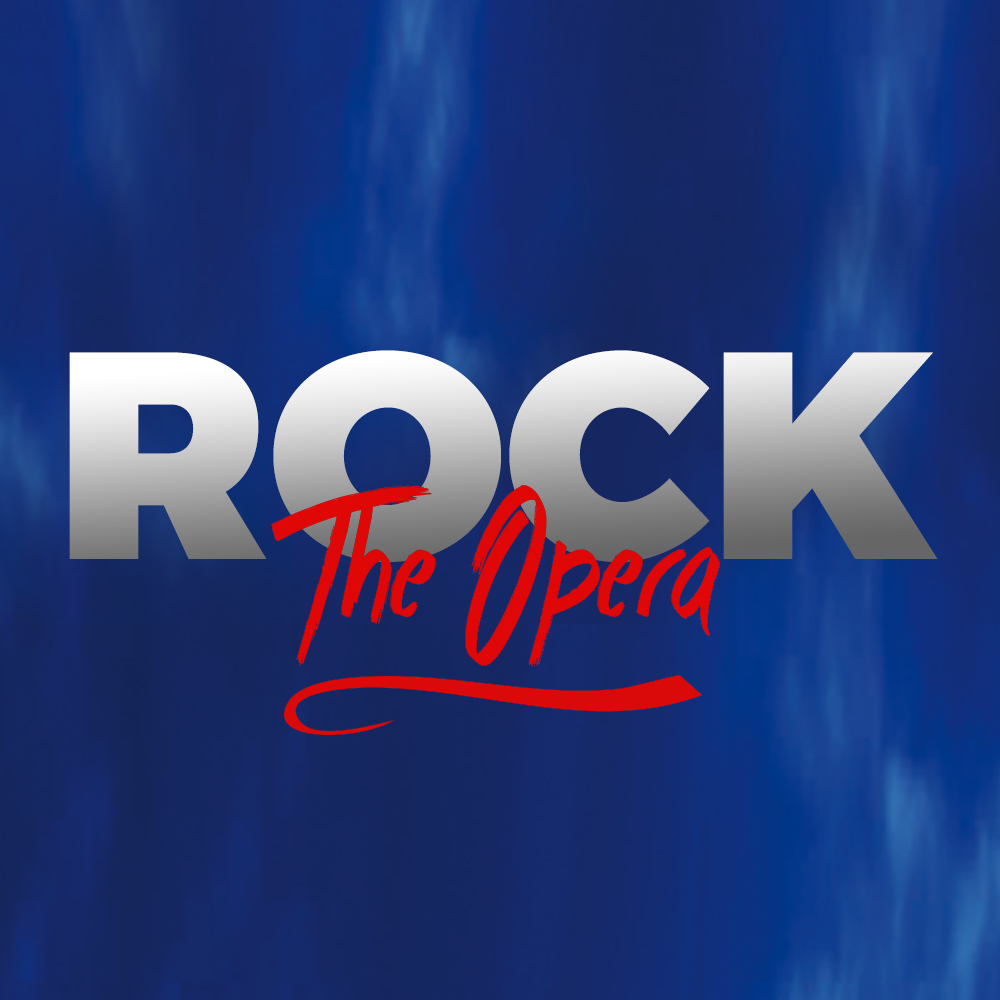
- Rock the Opera Logo
- Founded: 2015
- Location: Prague, Czech Republic
- Principal conductor: Friedemann Riehle
- Website: www.rocktheopera.com

Rock the Opera is a rock orchestra from Prague, Czech Republic. It was established in 2015 by the German conductor Friedemann Riehle.

Rock the Opera performs rock songs from artists such as Queen, U2, Pink Floyd, Led Zeppelin or AC/DC along with a symphony orchestra, usually Prague Philharmonic Orchestra.
