= Fix Me Up =

EP by A Firm Handshake
- Released: February 15, 2013
- Length: 24:01
- Label: Rock the Cause

Fix Me Up is the debut EP and only release by the American band A Firm Handshake. It was released on February 15, 2013, on the independent label Rock the Cause.

== Singles ==
"Clouds" taken from the EP and credited to Zach Sobiech was an international hit, charting in the US, the UK, Canada, France and Belgium.

== Track listing ==
1. "Star Hopping" (featuring Zach Sobiech & Sammy Brown) – 2:55
2. "Ames" (featuring Zach Sobiech & Sammy Brown) – 2:53
3. "Fix Me Up" (featuring Zach Sobiech & Sammy Brown) – 4:57
4. "Sandcastles" (featuring Zach Sobiech & Sammy Brown) – 3:29
5. "Coffee Cup" (featuring Zach Sobiech & Sammy Brown) – 4:44
6. "Blueberries" (featuring Zach Sobiech & Sammy Brown) – 2:04
7. "Clouds" (featuring Zach Sobiech) – 2:59

== Charts ==
Chart performance for Fix Me Up
Chart (2013)	Peak position
Canadian Albums (Billboard)	22
UK Albums (OCC)	121
UK Independent Albums (OCC)	24
US Billboard 200	20
US Folk Albums (Billboard)	1
