= Prague Philharmonic Orchestra =

Symphony orchestra in Prague, Czech Republic

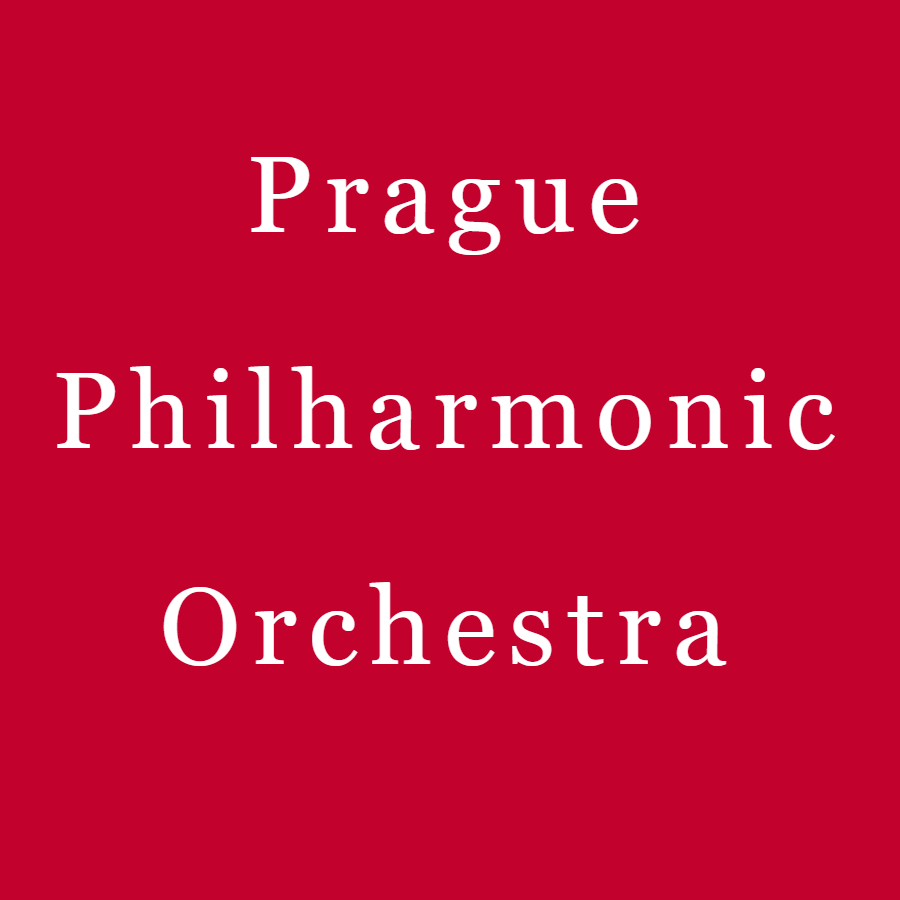
Logo of the Prague Philharmonic Orchestra

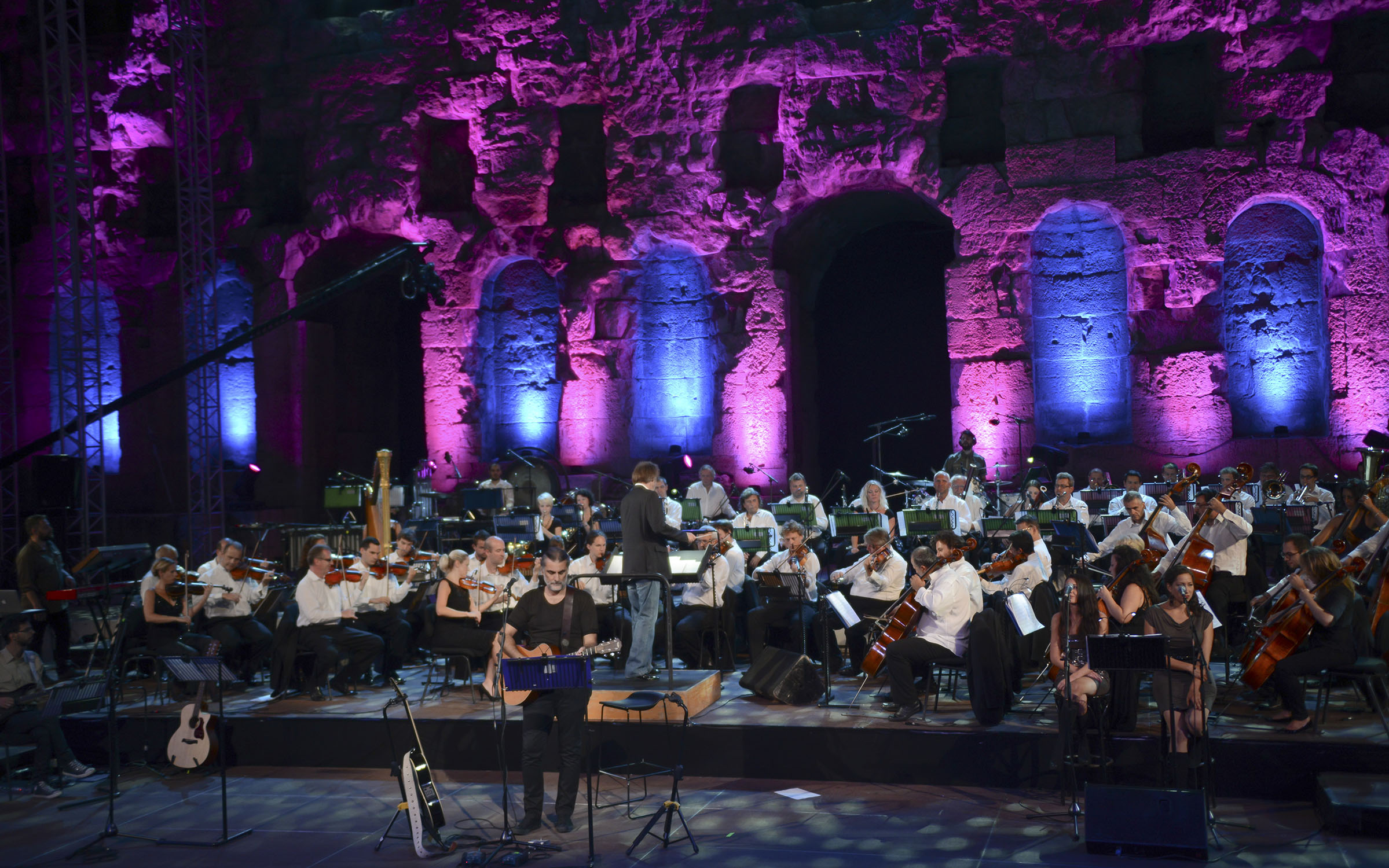
Prague Philharmonic Orchestra with Filippos Pliatsikas in Athens

The Prague Philharmonic Orchestra (Czech: Pražský Filharmonický Orchestr) was established in 1995, under the German conductor Friedemann Riehle. The orchestra has since produced many classical and film music recordings, working with labels such as Decca, EMI, Sony BMG and various international film studios. Internationally renowned soloists such as tenor Jonas Kaufmann or cellist Sol Gabetta have recorded CDs with the orchestra.

The orchestra performs New Year's Eve Concerts, conducted by Riehle, and has also performed concerts at the Vienna State Opera, all major German concert halls, the Royal Concertgebouw in Amsterdam, and a special concert broadcast internationally from the Burj Khalifa in Dubai. The orchestra has also performed with Paul Terracini as a guest conductor.

== Discography ==
- Symphonic Hymns of the Forefathers; ABC Classics ABC472 189-2 -- Arranger/Conductor: Paul Terracini (2002); with Ars Nova Copenhagen.
- CD with tenor Jonas Kaufmann bei decca
- CD with cellist Sol Gabetta bei RCA
- CD with singer Filippos Pliatsikas
