= Friedemann Riehle =

German conductor (born 1959)

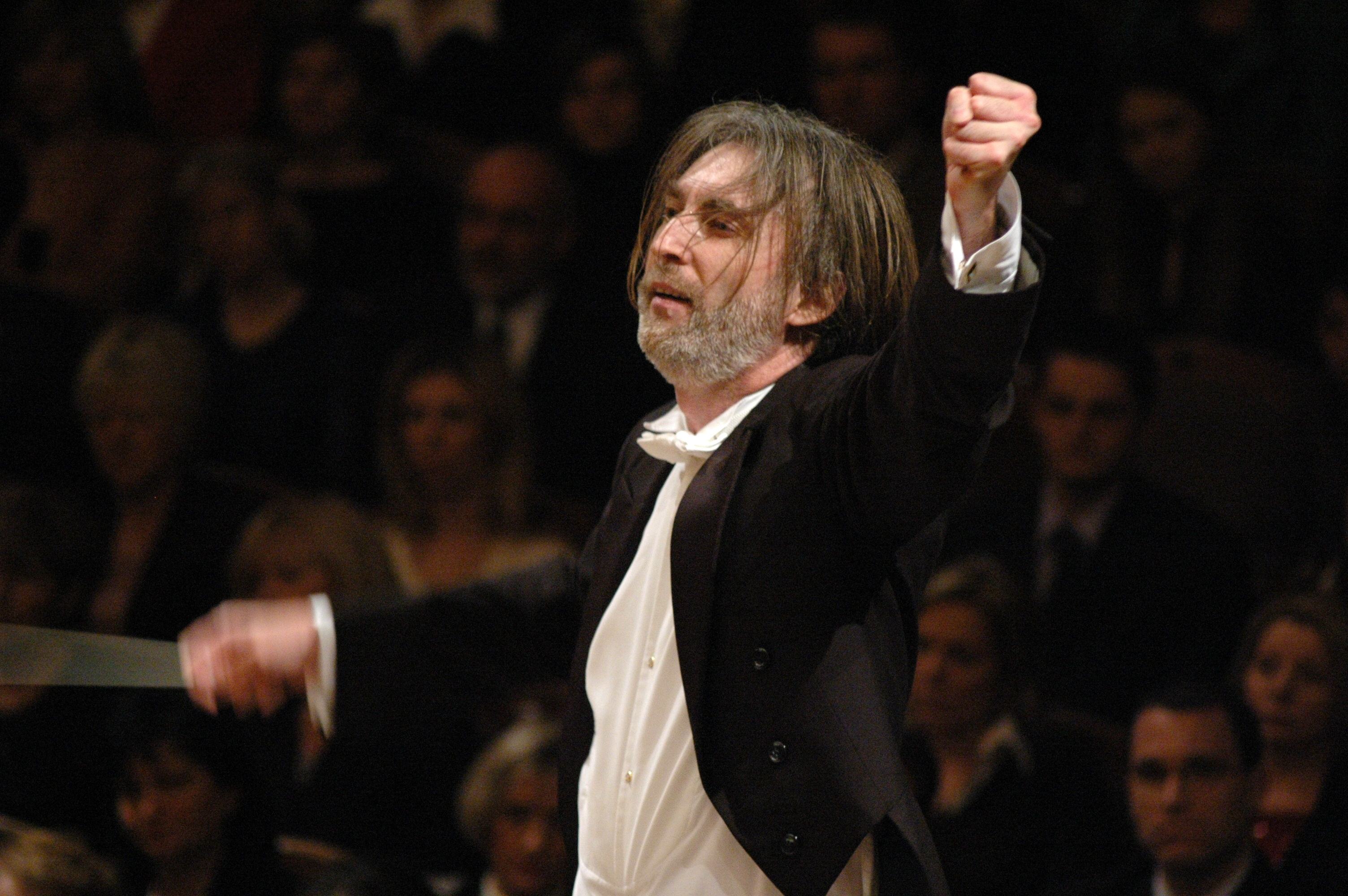
- Friedemann Riehle conducting the Symphony Orchestra of Czech Radio in the Dvořák Hall of the Prague Rudolfinum
- Born: Friedemann Karl Riehle; May 30, 1959 (age 67); Stuttgart, Germany
- Education: Meistersinger Academy (Nuremberg), Hochschule für Musik und Darstellende Kunst (Vienna)
- Occupation: Conductor
- Known for: Co-founder of the Prague Philharmonic Orchestra, founder of Rock the Opera

Friedemann Karl Riehle (born 30 May 1959) is a German conductor.

Riehle was born in Stuttgart. After violin lessons at a young age he studied classical guitar in Stuttgart as well as orchestra conducting at the Meistersinger Academy in Nuremberg and in Vienna at the Hochschule für Musik und Darstellende Kunst (now Universität für Musik und Darstellende Kunst Wien). Already as a student he conducted his first opera night with Carl Maria von Weber's opera "Oberon". In 1995, Riehle was one of the people who founded the Prague Philharmonic Orchestra. With this orchestra Riehle cooperates frequently for recordings, for the Prague New Year’s Concert as well as for concerts abroad. In order to make symphonic music easily accessible for a wider audience and especially for young people, Riehle started in 1997 to cut down long symphonic movements by Anton Bruckner and Gustav Mahler to pieces of a duration of about 7 minutes. This idea inspired many conductors years later.

Also, in order to incorporate epoch-making music of the 20th century into the classical repertoire, Riehle frequently conducts concerts with classical rock music by Deep Purple, Pink Floyd, Led Zeppelin and Queen. Riehle has worked with Ian Gillan of Deep Purple on eleven symphony in rock performances. In August 2015 and 2016 Riehle conducted a rock-concert with the Prague Philharmonic Orchestra in the Vienna State Opera house, called Rock the Opera.

From 1992 to 1995 and from 2009 to 2010, Friedemann Riehle was managing director of the Prague Opera Ball for the Prague State Opera. The Prague Opera Ball is the most famous charity event in the Czech Republic.
