= Zach Sobiech =

American singer-songwriter

Background information
- Born: Zachary David Sobiech; May 3, 1995; Saint Paul, Minnesota, U.S.
- Died: May 20, 2013 (aged 18) Lakeland, Minnesota, U.S.
- Genres: Folk rock; indie folk; indie pop
- Occupations: Singer; songwriter; musician
- Instruments: Vocals; guitar; piano
- Years active: 2009–2013

Zachary David Sobiech (May 3, 1995 – May 20, 2013) was an American singer-songwriter and musician, best known for his single "Clouds", which gained extensive media attention on YouTube, prior to Sobiech's death from cancer in May 2013. It charted on the Billboard Hot 100, eventually becoming a hit also in the UK, Canada and France.

== Life and career ==
Sobiech attended St. Croix Catholic School in Stillwater, Minnesota. He later attended Stillwater Area High School. At age 14, Sobiech was diagnosed with osteosarcoma, a bone cancer that mostly affects children. CBS reported that during his treatment he underwent 10 surgeries and 24 rounds of chemotherapy. He started writing music after his diagnosis.

In May of 2012, his doctors informed him that he had up to a year to live. Sobiech recorded the song "Clouds" about his battle with cancer, and released it as a YouTube video in December 2012. It went viral, surpassing 3 million views at the time of his death. It currently has more than 23 million views as of August 2026.

Prior to his death, Sobiech formed the band A Firm Handshake with Samantha "Sammy" Brown and Reed Redmond. A Firm Handshake's first EP and only release, Fix Me Up, was released digitally in early 2013, charting in the US, the UK and Canada. The debut single by A Firm Handshake is "How to Go to Confession" featuring Sammy Brown.

== Death ==
Sobiech died on May 20, 2013, of complications from osteosarcoma, at his home in Lakeland, an eastern suburb of Saint Paul, Minnesota. His funeral was held at the Catholic Church of St. Michael and he was later buried in St. Michael's Cemetery.

== Tributes ==
Rainn Wilson's YouTube channel SoulPancake released a documentary about Sobiech, directed by director-actor Justin Baldoni, a part of its online reality series, My Last Days. The 22-minute episode of My Last Days: Meet Zach Sobiech has been watched more than 15.6 million times on the main SoulPancake YouTube channel. A further episode entitled My Last Days: Zach Sobiech, One Year Later was created to follow up with Sobiech's family and friends after his death.

Artists have released many tributes, including many cover versions of "Clouds"—with a prominent version of "Clouds" released on SoulPancake, featuring director Rainn Wilson himself, along with Bryan Cranston, Ashley Tisdale, Jason Mraz, Sara Bareilles, Colbie Caillat, Phillip Phillips, Passenger, The Lumineers and many others. The music video on SoulPancake presented in collaboration with Wayfarer Entertainment was directed by Justin Baldoni, produced by Baldoni and Ahmed Kolacek, with Fouad Elgohari as associate producer and Nick Pezzillo as editor. The video has been viewed over 5 million times on the SoulPancake YouTube channel.

On December 5, 2013, a choir of an estimated 5,000 sang Sobiech's hit song "Clouds" at the Mall of America. The event was organized by the KS95 Kids Radiothon in collaboration with the Children's Cancer Research Fund and Gillette Children's Specialty Healthcare. The 12th annual iteration of the event was held on December 6, 2024.

== Legacy ==
Sobiech's family established the Zach Sobiech Osteosarcoma Fund at Children's Cancer Research Fund. In September 2015, the fund reached $2 million.

Zach's mother Laura Sobiech wrote a memoir about his life, Fly a Little Higher: How God Answered a Mom's Small Prayer in a Big Way.

In early 2016, it was announced that Warner Bros. was developing a film based on Laura Sobiech's book. The film Clouds was released on Disney+ on October 16, 2020. Production started on October 19, 2019, in Montreal, and was directed by Justin Baldoni. The film stars Fin Argus as Zach and Sabrina Carpenter as Sammy.

== Discography ==
=== Extended plays ===
Title	Album details	Peak chart positions							
Title	Album details	US	US Dig.	US Heat.	US Indie	US Rock	CAN	UK	UK Indie
Fix Me Up (Among A Firm Handshake)	Released: February 15, 2013; Label: Rock the Cause; Format: Digital download	20	9	27	4	6	22	121	24

=== Singles ===
Single	Year	Peak positions								Album
Single	Year	US	US Rock	BEL (Wa)	CAN	FR	SWI	UK	UK Indie	Album
"Clouds"	2013	26	3	29	14	26	73	50	8	Fix Me Up
