= Fin Argus =

American actor and musician

- Born: Steffan Fin Argus; Des Plaines, Illinois, U.S.
- Education: Berklee College of Music
- Occupations: Actor; musician
- Years active: 2011−present

Steffan Fin Argus is an American actor, musician, and model.

== Early life and education ==
Argus is from Des Plaines, Illinois. They were a self-described "theatre kid" growing up and learned to play several instruments. "I picked up the Spanish guitar in third grade... Then the piano. Then the French horn. Then the cello. Then the ukulele, mandolin, and banjo. Then the bass guitar." They attended Maine West High School and then studied at Berklee College of Music in Boston.

== Career ==
Argus began acting in local theatre productions at a young age and was a member of Kidz Bop. They are signed with Ford Models and modeled the Yves Saint Laurent 2016 Spring / Summer Line for Barneys New York. They released an EP in 2017 titled Lost at Sea.

They starred in the web series The Commute. Argus was cast in the lead role as Zach Sobiech in the Disney+ musical drama Clouds. They appeared on Agents of S.H.I.E.L.D. as a younger version of Gordon, previously played by Jamie Harris.

== Personal life ==
Argus is genderqueer.

== Filmography ==
=== Film ===
Year	Title	Role	Notes
2011	Requiem	Little Boy	Short film
2011	Life Lessons	Dancing Boy	Short film; Uncredited
2012	Harvest	Charlie	Short film
2012	Stitches	Sam	Short film
2016	Virtual High	Julian	Short film
2017	Perception	Charlie	Short film
2017	Leaked Wedding	Testimonial 2	Short film
2017	Carma	Sexy Guy	Short film
2017	The Regulars	Elvis	Short film
2018	Summer '03	Josh	Uncredited
2020	Clouds	Zach Sobiech	
2022	Stay Awake	Derek	

=== Television ===
Year	Title	Role	Notes
2017	The Gifted	Jack	Episode: "eXposed"
2020	Agents of S.H.I.E.L.D.	Young Gordon	2 episodes
2022	Queer as Folk	Mingus	Main cast
2023	The Other Two	Lucas	Recurring role, 4 episodes

=== Web ===
Year	Title	Role	Notes
2016−2017	The Commute	Hansen	Main cast
2018−2019	Total Eclipse	Julian	Recurring (seasons 2−3)

== Discography ==
- Make Me Cry (2016)
- Lost at Sea (2017)
- Exposure (2022)
- Playboy 1973 (2025)
- Front Door (2025)
