= Clouds (2020 film) =

2020 film by Justin Baldoni

- Promotional poster
- Directed by: Justin Baldoni
- Screenplay by: Kara Holden
- Story by: Patrick Kopka; Casey La Scala; Kara Holden
- Based on: Fly a Little Higher: How God Answered a Mom's Small Prayer in a Big Way by Laura Sobiech
- Produced by: Justin Baldoni; Andrew Lazar; Casey La Scala
- Starring: Fin Argus; Sabrina Carpenter; Madison Iseman; Lil Rel Howery; Tom Everett Scott; Neve Campbell
- Cinematography: Ben Kutchins
- Edited by: Brett M. Reed
- Music by: Brian Tyler
- Production companies: Warner Bros. Pictures; Wayfarer Studios; Mad Chance Productions; La Scala Films
- Distributed by: Disney+
- Release dates: October 9, 2020 (Mill Valley Film Festival); October 16, 2020 (United States)
- Running time: 121 minutes
- Country: United States
- Language: English

Clouds is a 2020 American biographical romantic musical drama teen film directed and produced by Justin Baldoni and written by Kara Holden from a story by Holden, Patrick Kopka, and Casey La Scala. It is based upon the memoir Fly a Little Higher: How God Answered a Mom's Small Prayer in a Big Way by Laura Sobiech. The film stars Fin Argus, Sabrina Carpenter, Madison Iseman, Neve Campbell, Tom Everett Scott, and Lil Rel Howery. It tells the story of Zach Sobiech, a teenager from Minnesota who has osteosarcoma and decides to follow his dream of becoming a musician after finding out he is dying.

Originally scheduled to be theatrically released by Warner Bros. Pictures before the COVID-19 pandemic shut down public movie theaters, Walt Disney Studios took over the distribution rights and released the film on their Disney+ streaming service on October 16, 2020. The film was removed from Disney+ on May 26, 2023.

== Plot ==
In the fall of 2012, Zach Sobiech performs an acoustic rendition of "Sexy and I Know It" to an amused crowd at his school's talent show. Zach has been struggling with osteosarcoma and receiving regular treatments for it. His best friend, Sammy Brown, conspires with him by helping him to write music ("Blueberries"). Zach manages to ask out fellow student Amy Adamle for a picnic, but before he is able to do so, he begins to have a coughing fit that concerns his mother, Laura, who rushes him to the hospital. He has a collapsed lung, and emergency surgery is performed on him. While they fix his lung, they learn the treatments are no longer effective and his cancer is now terminal, giving him six to 10 months to live. Zach tells Sammy and Amy about his diagnosis while he is inspired by his teacher, Milton Weaver, about what he should do with the rest of his life.

In the winter of 2012, Zach and his family go to Lourdes, France, in Laura's desperate attempt to summon some kind of miracle for Zach. Zach returns home to hang out with Sammy ("Coffee Cup") and learns she has bought tickets to a Jason Mraz concert. Zach decides to use the opportunity to ask Amy to go to the prom with him, and she accepts ("I'm Yours"). After having convulsions, Zach goes to Sammy's house in the middle of the night demanding that they form a band. Both realize they have romantic feelings for each other, but that they are incapable of having a full relationship. They continue to bond over songwriting ("Fix Me Up"), and Sammy posts their music on YouTube, which earns them some fame. Despite this, Zach is certain he will fail to achieve anything beyond the video. He is later given encouragement by Mr. Weaver.

Zach's father, Rob, borrows a Nissan GT-R for him to drive and impress Amy with. While at her house, the two proceed to make out ("My Little Dancer"), but when Amy comments on his scars, Zach becomes despondent, tells her that he will never offer the things she wants from him, and leaves. Laura confronts Rob over the decision to get a car for Zach and he breaks down, admitting he did it to make his son happy as he is unable to do anything about his eventual death.

In the spring of 2013, Weaver reveals to Zach and Sammy that he showed their video to BMI, who wants to sign them. They head to New York City to sign their contracts, calling their band A Firm Handshake ("Ames"). On the flight home, Zach suddenly has a moment of creative energy and writes the song "Clouds". He records the song shortly afterwards, which becomes a hit.

Zach finally makes the time to apologize to Amy about his behavior, and the two get back together. Zach speaks privately to his mother about how to handle his remains and his funeral, suggesting bagpipes be played. Sammy and the Sobiechs learn that Zach might not make it to the prom. With Zach having been given the opportunity to play at the Metro Theatre, they decide to combine the concert with their prom, a graduation, and a fundraiser for osteosarcoma. The day arrives and despite Zach's worsening condition, he decides to perform. Sammy begins the show by performing "How to Go to Confession" before Zach heads out to perform "Clouds". Zach has trouble breathing, but he is moved when the entire audience sings the song for him.

Zach dies on May 20, 2013. Before dying, he writes a college essay about his views on life and death. Sammy, Amy, and other friends come together for a group photo in remembrance of Zach, noticing that a cloud in the sky resembles a "Z". Photos of the real Zach and Sammy are shown during the end credits.

== Cast ==
- Fin Argus as Zach Sobiech, Rob and Laura's son
- Sabrina Carpenter as Sammy Brown, Zach's best friend
- Madison Iseman as Amy Adamle, Zach's girlfriend
- Lil Rel Howery as Milton Weaver, Zach's teacher
- Tom Everett Scott as Rob Sobiech, Zach's father and Laura's husband
- Neve Campbell as Laura Sobiech, Zach's mother and Rob's wife
- Summer H. Howell as Grace Sobiech, Zach's younger sister
- Vivien Endicott-Douglas as Alli Sobiech, Zach's older sister
- Dylan Everett as Sam Sobiech, Zach's older brother
- Jason Mraz as himself
- Luis Oliva as hip agent

Justin Baldoni's wife, Emily Baldoni, appears as a CNN reporter. Many of Zach Sobiech's real life acquaintances make cameos in the film. Seventy of Zach's friends and family members cameo during the crowd shots for the Jason Mraz concert and the concert at the end of the film. Zach's real life friend Mitchell Kluesner, essentially playing himself, appears in the classroom scene sitting behind Zach. The real Grace Sobiech appears as a high school student early on in the film, while the real Amy Adamle appears along with Madison Iseman at the dance studio.

== Production ==
=== Development ===
In February 2016, it was announced Warner Bros. had acquired rights to the memoir Fly a Little Higher: How God Answered a Mom's Small Prayer in a Big Way by Laura Sobiech, with Justin Baldoni set to direct the film.

In September 2019, Fin Argus, Madison Iseman, and Sabrina Carpenter joined the cast of the film. In October 2019, Neve Campbell, Tom Everett Scott, and Lil Rel Howery also joined the cast.

=== Filming ===
Principal photography began on October 19, 2019. Most of the movie was filmed in Baie-D'Urfé, Quebec, Canada and in Sainte-Anne-de-Bellevue, Quebec, Canada. Part of it was filmed at Heritage Regional High School and neighboring school École secondaire André-Laurendeau. Filming wrapped on November 27, 2019.

== Release ==
On May 14, 2020, it was announced Disney+ had taken over distribution rights to the film from Warner Bros., in light of the impact of the COVID-19 pandemic on the film industry. Clouds was released on October 16, 2020. A making-of documentary series entitled Beyond the Clouds was released from December 4, 2020, to January 29, 2021. The film was removed from Disney+ on May 26, 2023.

== Reception ==
=== Audience viewership ===
According to ScreenEngine/ASI, Clouds was the 28th-most-watched straight-to-streaming title of 2020, as of November 2020.

=== Critical reception ===
On review aggregator website Rotten Tomatoes, the film holds an approval rating of 83% based on 23 reviews, with an average rating of 6.6/10. The website's critics consensus reads, "Although its emotional swings occasionally miss, Clouds soars higher than most young adult films -- and proves director Justin Baldoni's mastery behind the camera." Metacritic assigned the film a weighted average score of 55 out of 100, based on 7 critics, indicating "mixed or average" reviews.

Guy Lodge of Variety claimed that the film manages to be sentimental across Justin Baldoni's direction and Ben Kutchins' cinematography, found the scenes where Zach Sobiech's family is horrified and saddened by his illness to be among the best, and praised the performances of the cast members. Amy Nicholson of The New York Times complimented how Baldoni approached the impact of Sobiech's death on his relatives, found the documentary to be emotional, and praised the performances of Fin Argus and Sabrina Carpenter. John Serba of Decider found the movie to be sincere through its direction, saying it manages to provide an emotional weigh on the audience by not sugarcoating Sobiech's life, while praising the performances of the actors, especially Lil Rel Howery's.

Jennifer Green of Common Sense Media rated the movie 4 out of 5 stars, stating: "Clouds is the true, often sad story of Zach Sobiech (Fin Argus), a teenager diagnosed with terminal cancer who became known to many via his hit song "Clouds", which was recorded in the final months of his life. But the movie has a generally positive tone, thanks to Zach's natural good nature. In an opening scene, he sings "Sexy and I Know It" in front of a high school audience, dancing suggestively and conveying both popularity and a self deprecating sense of humor. Scenes show him struggling with illness, undergoing chemotherapy, being rushed in for emergency surgery, and facing his own terminal diagnosis. He occasionally reacts with anger and deception to his fate, including a scene in which he almost crashes a car. He's also painfully aware of the grief he's bringing to his loved ones, including his tight-knit family, a girlfriend, and his best friend, who all exhibit courage and compassion in their handling of Zach's illness." Nell Minow of RogerEbert.com rated the film 3 out of 4 stars and found the movie emotional, claiming it depicts the sad and joyful moments of Sobiech's life and the impact of his death on his environment, while complimenting the performances of the cast.

=== Impact ===
After the release of the movie, the song "Clouds" (written and recorded by Zach Sobiech) hit the iTunes song chart at the number #1 spot a second time, seven years after Sobiech's death. A virtual concert titled Clouds: A Musical Celebration was held as a musical tribute on October 24, 2020, with OneRepublic, Fin Argus, Sabrina Carpenter, and several cast members from Clouds participating.

=== Accolades ===
Year	Award	Category	Recipient(s)	Result	Ref.
2020	Heartland Film Festival	Truly Moving Picture Award	Justin Baldoni	Won	
2021	Writers Guild of America	Adapted Long Form	Kara Holden, Patrick Kopka, Casey La Scala	Nominated	
