= Tasty =

Tasty may refer to:

- Taste, a sense

== Music ==
- Tasty (band), a South Korean band
- Tasty (Good Rats album), 1974, or the title track
- Tasty (Kelis album), 2003
- Tasty (Patti LaBelle album), 1978
- Tasty (The Shadows album), 1977
- "Tasty", a song by NCT 127 from their 2022 album 2 Baddies
- "Tasty", a song by Takanashi Kiara from Vogelfrei

== Other ==
- Tasty (web series), a video series created by BuzzFeed
- Tasty (nightclub), a nightclub in Melbourne, Australia, known for a police raid in 1994

== See also ==
- Taste (disambiguation)
