= Tast =

Tast may refer to:

- du Tast Lake (French: Lac Du Tast; a.k.a. Lake Tast), Quebec, Canada; a lake
- Tast Fest, a festival held at New Center Park, New Centre, Detroit, Michigan, US
- Carrols Restaurant Group (stock ticker: TAST)
- T_{AST} (Time of Assertion) in linguistics

== See also ==
- Taste (disambiguation)
