= Taste (disambiguation) =

Taste is the sensation and/or perception of flavors.

Taste may also refer to:

== Common uses ==
- Aesthetic taste, the ability to judge an object as being 'high quality' or 'low quality', aesthetically speaking.

== Arts, entertainment, and media ==
=== Music ===
==== Groups ====
- Taste (Irish band), an Irish rock band formed in the 1960s
- Taste (Australian band), an Australian band active in the 1970s

==== Albums ====
- Taste (Haechan album), 2025
- Taste (Taste album), 1969
- Taste (The Telescopes album), 1989

==== Songs ====
- "Taste" (Tyga song), 2018 single featuring Offset
- "Taste" (Sabrina Carpenter song), 2024
- "Taste" (Sophie Ellis-Bextor song), 2025
- "Taste (Make It Shake)", by Aitch, 2019
- "Taste", by Animal Collective from Merriweather Post Pavilion, 2009
- "Taste", by Betty Who from Betty, 2019
- "Taste", by Coco Jones from Why Not More?, 2025
- "Taste", by Phish from Billy Breathes, 1996
- "Taste", by Red Velvet from RBB, 2018
- "Taste", by Ride from Nowhere, 1990
- "Taste", by Stray Kids from Maxident, 2022
- "The Taste", by Five for Fighting from The Battle for Everything, 2003
- "The Taste", by Moka Only from Vermilion, 2007

=== Other uses in arts, entertainment, and media ===
- Taste (film), a 2021 drama film
- "Taste" (short story), a short story by Roald Dahl
- Taste (TV series), a 1994 Food Network series created by David Rosengarten
- Taste (TV series), a 2005 cookery television show
- Taste, a 2004 TV-movie starring Richard Ruccolo
- Taste, an online magazine owned by Penguin Random House
- Taste Media, a record label
- Taste: My Life Through Food, a 2021 memoir by Stanley Tucci

== Brands and enterprises ==
- Taste (software), a Macintosh word processor
- Taste (supermarket), part of the AS Watson Group, Hong Kong

== See also ==
- Degustation, the careful, appreciative tasting of various foods
- Tastemaker (disambiguation)
- Wine tasting
- Tast (disambiguation)
