= Bed Chem =

Single by Sabrina Carpenter

from the album Short n' Sweet
- B-side: "Bed Chem (instrumental)"
- Released: October 8, 2024
- Studio: The Perch (Calabasas, California); Juicy Hill (The Bahamas); The Playpen (Calabasas, California)
- Genre: R&B; disco; synth-pop
- Length: 2:51
- Label: Island
- Songwriters: Sabrina Carpenter; Julia Michaels; Amy Allen; John Ryan; Ian Kirkpatrick
- Producers: John Ryan; Ian Kirkpatrick

Sabrina Carpenter singles chronology
"Taste" (2024)	"Bed Chem" (2024)	"Busy Woman" (2025)

Lyric video
- "Bed Chem" on YouTube

"Bed Chem" is a song by American singer Sabrina Carpenter from her sixth studio album, Short n' Sweet (2024). Written by Carpenter, Julia Michaels, Amy Allen, John Ryan and Ian Kirkpatrick and produced by the two latter, Island Records released the song to US contemporary hit radio on October 8, 2024, as the album's fourth single. Musically, it is an R&B, disco, and synth-pop song set over a synthesizer-backed musical bed. The lyrics detail Carpenter's attraction to a man, which leads her to imagine satisfying sexual encounters with him.

Some music critics were positive about "Bed Chem", while others considered it unoriginal and criticized the sexual lyrics. "Bed Chem" debuted and peaked at number 14 on the Billboard Hot 100. Outside of the United States, "Bed Chem" peaked within the top ten of the charts in Australia, Ireland, New Zealand, the Philippines, Singapore, and the United Kingdom. "Bed Chem" was certified triple platinum in Australia and Canada, double platinum in the United States, and platinum in New Zealand and the United Kingdom. Carpenter included "Bed Chem" on the set list of her fifth concert tour, the Short n' Sweet Tour (2024–2025).

== Background and release ==
In January 2021, Sabrina Carpenter signed a recording contract with Island Records. She announced that she was working on her sixth studio album in March 2024, exploring new genres and expecting that it would herald a new chapter in her life. In anticipation of her performance at Coachella, Carpenter announced that a single called "Espresso" would be released on April 11, 2024. The song was a surprise success, becoming her first number one single on the Billboard Global 200 chart and her first song to enter the top 10 on the Billboard Hot 100. She followed this with "Please Please Please" in June, which reached number one on the Billboard Hot 100.

Carpenter conceived the song title "Bed Chem" after she shared a bed with her best friend and they fell asleep and woke up simultaneously; this led them to declare that they had "really good bed chem". After meeting a man with whom she believed she had it too, Carpenter wrote the song with songwriters Julia Michaels and Amy Allen and its producers, John Ryan and Ian Kirkpatrick. Prior to its release, Paper's Erica Campbell stated that she felt it highlighted Carpenter's sultry side. Describing its conception, Carpenter jokingly stated that, "there was a lot of steam in the studio. It was real hot and heavy". Carpenter noted that she wanted to "write a song both sexy and lighthearted". She cited American singer Christina Aguilera as an inspiration for the song, stating that the song's retro vibe was influenced by Aguilera and other music she grew up listening to.

Preceding an official announcement, billboards bearing tweets about Carpenter's height began appearing throughout New York City. On June 3, 2024, she announced the album, titled Short n' Sweet, and revealed its cover artwork. The track list was revealed on July 9, 2024; "Bed Chem" appeared as the album's sixth track. It became available for digital download and streaming on August 23, 2024. Island Records released the track to US contemporary hit radio stations as the album's fourth and final single on October 8, 2024. The song was also released on the 7-inch vinyl format on January 10, 2025.

== Composition ==
"Bed Chem"
"Bed Chem" is an R&B, disco, and synth-pop song set over a musical bed with influences of music from the 1980s and the 2010s.

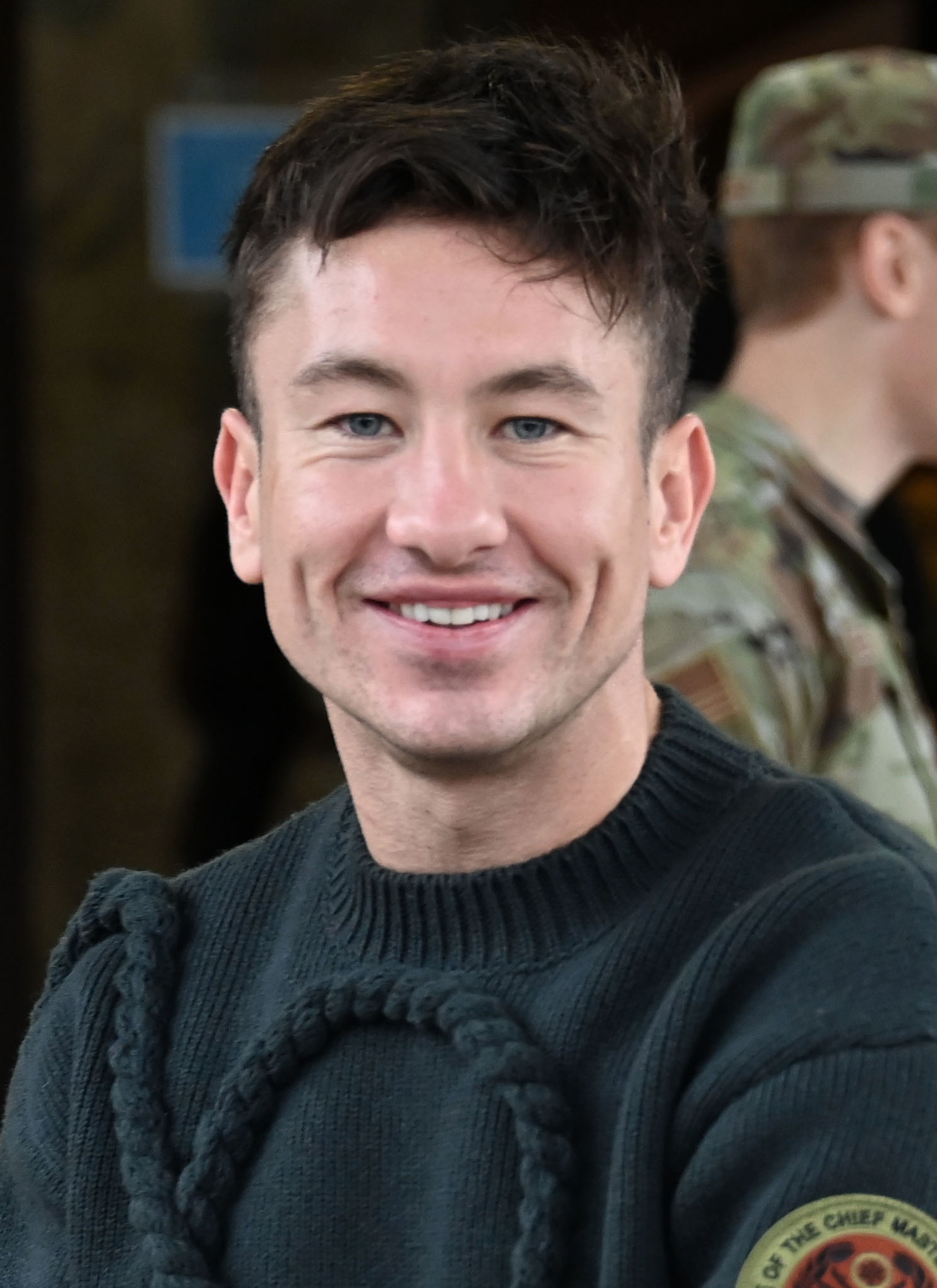
Some journalists analyzed Irish actor Barry Keoghan as the potential subject of "Bed Chem".

"Bed Chem" is 2 minutes and 51 seconds long. It was recorded at the Perch in Calabasas, California, Juicy Hill Studios in the Bahamas, and the Playpen in Calabasas, California. Ryan and Kirkpatrick produced and programmed the song. They played drums, guitar, keyboards, percussion, and bass, and they engineered it with Jeff Gunnell. Nathan Dantzler mastered the song with assistance from Harrison Tate, and Serban Ghenea mixed it at MixStar Studios in Virginia Beach with engineering from Bryce Bordone.

"Bed Chem" is an R&B disco, pop, and synth-pop song set over an R&B-influenced musical bed. Critics viewed influences of music from the 1980s and the 2010s in the song. Its production incorporates a G-funk-influenced whistle and synthesizers, which were described as "sexy honeymoon synths" by Pitchfork's Quinn Moreland and "sunshine synths" by The Line of Best Fit's Tanatat Khuttapan. Carpenter deadpans the line "Come right on me, I mean camaraderie". Paste's Grace Robins-Somerville summarized "Bed Chem" as containing "Future Nostalgia-era Dua Lipa disco pastiche, the riffs-over-diction sigh-singing popularized by Ariana Grande, [and] a Swiftian pre-chorus". Billboard's Jason Lipshutz described the song as "a dreamy flirtation full of pinpoint vocals, personal touches, sexual innuendos and melodies".

The title of the song, "Bed Chem", is shorthand for "bedroom chemistry", and its lyrics revolve around Carpenter feeling an intense attraction to a man, leading her to imagine satisfying sexual encounters with him. She sings about how the man has captivated her and invites him to "come right on me", despite living in countries with different time zones. Sputnikmusic's Sowing interpreted this as a potential pun where Carpenter may be asking the subject to "cum" (ejaculate) on her. During the bridge, Carpenter fantasizes that the encounter would probably turn out to be even better than her imagination, describing that they would "arrive at the same time" and set the temperature of the thermostat to 69. The song contains multiple euphemisms about penis sizes.

"Bed Chem" contains descriptions of the first time Carpenter met the subject, with lyrics stating that she was in a "sheer dress" and he donned a white jacket. Carpenter also sings that he had "wide, blue eyes" and a "thick accent". Some journalists analyzed Carpenter's then-boyfriend Irish actor Barry Keoghan as the potential subject. Elle's Maya Ernest perceived several references to Keoghan, and Dylan Kickham of Elite Daily opined that Carpenter "made the muse of [the song] incredibly clear", adding that the song is "all about her boyfriend Barry Keoghan's prowess in the bedroom." Keoghan later stated that the song was his favorite from Short n' Sweet.

It is composed in a key of B minor, and moves at a tempo of 95 beats per minute.

== Critical reception ==
Some critics were positive about "Bed Chem". Campbell picked the song as a highlight on Short n' Sweet. Lipshutz ranked it fourth among the twelve album tracks, stating that it has "melodies strong enough to be main hooks that then lead into even better melodies". He and Slate's Carl Wilson both believed that the titular phrase would gain common usage as slang. Others questioned if the song was too unoriginal. NME's Rhian Daly thought it was "moulded in Ariana Grande's image". While Robins-Somerville praised Carpenter's vocal performance, she was negative about the song's resemblance to the work of other artists and believed the pre-chorus could have been copied from multiple Taylor Swift albums.

The sexual nature of "Bed Chem" and the lyric "Come right on me, I mean camaraderie" also received critical commentary. Capital's Sam Prance thought that in the context of Carpenter "being unashamedly horny in her music", she had "outdone herself" with the song. Wilson believed that it and the track "Juno" were some of the "horniest" ones on the album. Rolling Stone's Rob Sheffield praised the rhyme about camaraderie as "Shakespearean", while The Daily Telegraph's Neil McCormick considered the pun "too rude to print". In a negative review, Sowing used it as an example while stating that the song is "overflowing with awkward puns".

Nylon included "Bed Chem" in their list of the seven best songs of its release week, with Sofia Ante stating that Carpenter was "at her most charming — cheeky, seductive, and impossible to resist — that'll leave you blushing for three full minutes". "Bed Chem" was placed on critical lists of the best songs of 2024 at number eight by The Independent, number nine by Dazed, and number twenty-six by NME.

== Commercial performance ==
"Bed Chem" debuted and peaked at number 14 on the Billboard Hot 100 issued for September 7, 2024. The song received a double platinum certification from the Recording Industry Association of America. In Canada, it entered at number 17 on the Canadian Hot 100 issued for the same date and was certified triple platinum by Music Canada. In the United Kingdom, "Bed Chem" debuted at number nine on the UK Singles Chart, and peaked at number six after four weeks in the chart, becoming Carpenter's fourth top ten song in Britain, and her only song not to peak at the top the UK Singles Chart during 2024. The song received a platinum certification from the British Phonographic Industry.

In Australia, "Bed Chem" peaked at number ten on the ARIA Singles Chart, and became Carpenter's fourth top ten song in Australia. In New Zealand, the song peaked at number nine on the New Zealand Singles Chart, and was certified double platinum by Recorded Music NZ. It charted at number 14 on the Billboard Global 200. Elsewhere, "Bed Chem" reached national record charts at number 5 in Ireland, number 10 in Singapore, number 30 in Portugal, number 47 in Greece, number 65 in Sweden, and number 82 in Nigeria. It received a gold certification in Portugal.

== Live performances ==
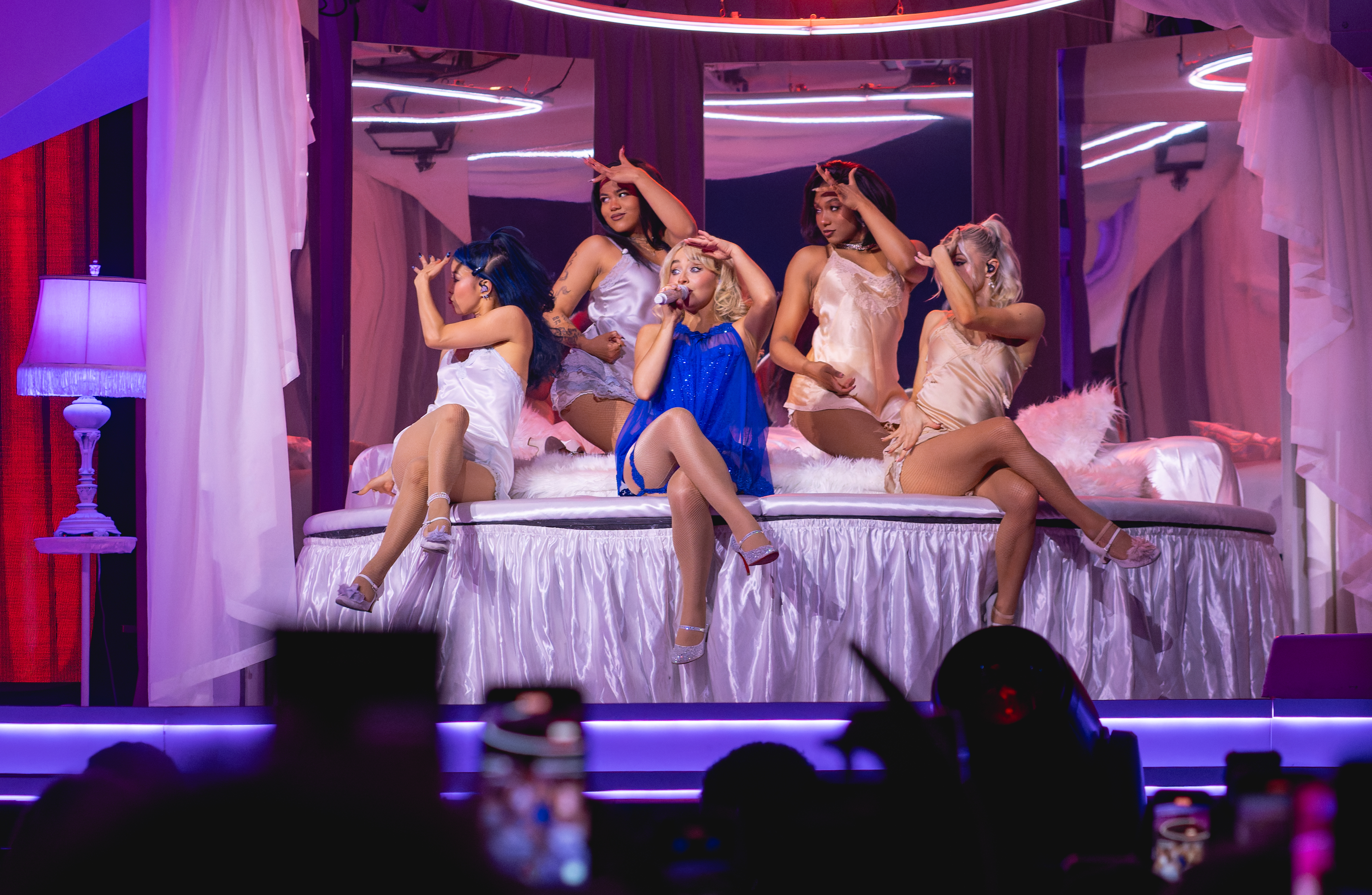
Carpenter performing "Bed Chem" on the Short n' Sweet Tour in 2025

Carpenter included "Bed Chem" on the set list of her fifth concert tour, the Short n' Sweet Tour (2024–2025). The performance begins with the words "parental discretion is advised" being displayed on a screen, and Carpenter sings the song on an onstage bed. Towards the climax, a man from her entourage enters with a camcorder and they undress behind shutting curtains as the lights gradually fade to darkness. According to the Chicago Tribune's Bob Gendron, this is "a clichéd way to suggest maturation". At the tour's stop in Charlottesville's John Paul Jones Arena, cameras captured Keoghan giving a dizzy expression and hiding his face with his pass during the "Bed Chem" performance, drawing media attention.

Carpenter sang the song during a Tiny Desk concert in December 2024. On March 1, 2025, she reprised it in a medley with "Espresso" at the Brit Awards 2025 in London. Carpenter began by performing a version of the latter with elements of "Rule, Britannia!" alongside a group of dancing King's Guards, followed by "Bed Chem" as she danced on a massive pink bed while accompanied by a group of backing dancers on their own boudoirs. Towards the end, she and a guard moved close together and were lowered out of the audience's sight. NME's Max Pilley described it as "seductive" and "eye-catching".

== Credits and personnel ==
Credits are adapted from the liner notes of Short n' Sweet.

- Sabrina Carpenter – vocals, songwriter
- John Ryan – producer, songwriter, drums, guitar, keyboards, percussion, programming, engineer, bass
- Ian Kirkpatrick – producer, songwriter, drums, guitar, keyboards, percussion, programming, engineer, bass
- Julia Michaels – songwriter, background vocals
- Amy Allen – songwriter, background vocals
- Jeff Gunnell – engineer
- Nathan Dantzler – mastering
- Harrison Tate – mastering assistance
- Serban Ghenea – mixing
- Bryce Bordone – mix engineer

== Charts ==
=== Weekly charts ===
Chart (2024–2025)	Peak position
Australia (ARIA)	10
Canada Hot 100 (Billboard)	17
Canada CHR/Top 40 (Billboard)	4
Croatia International Airplay (Top lista)	84
Estonia Airplay (TopHit)	10
Global 200 (Billboard)	14
Greece International (IFPI)	47
Ireland (IRMA)	5
Lithuania Airplay (TopHit)	57
Netherlands (Single Tip)	2
New Zealand (Recorded Music NZ)	9
Nigeria (TurnTable Top 100)	82
Norway (VG-lista)	43
Philippines (Philippines Hot 100)	6
Portugal (AFP)	30
Singapore (RIAS)	10
Sweden (Sverigetopplistan)	65
UK Singles (Official Charts)	6
US Billboard Hot 100	14
US Adult Contemporary (Billboard)	27
US Adult Pop Airplay (Billboard)	21
US Dance Airplay (Billboard)	20
US Pop Airplay (Billboard)	1
US Rhythmic Airplay (Billboard)	18

=== Monthly charts ===
Chart (2024–2025)	Peak position
Estonia Airplay (TopHit)	17
Lithuania Airplay (TopHit)	67

=== Year-end charts ===
Chart (2024)	Position
Philippines (Philippines Hot 100)	79

Chart (2025)	Position
Australia (ARIA)	82
Canada CHR/Top 40 (Billboard)	22
Estonia Airplay (TopHit)	143
UK Singles (OCC)	58
US Billboard Hot 100	45
US Pop Airplay (Billboard)	13

== Certifications ==
Certifications
Region	Certification	Certified units/sales
Australia (ARIA)	3× Platinum	210,000^{‡}
Brazil (Pro-Música Brasil)	Diamond	160,000^{‡}
Canada (Music Canada)	3× Platinum	240,000^{‡}
Denmark (IFPI Danmark)	Gold	45,000^{‡}
France (SNEP)	Gold	100,000^{‡}
New Zealand (RMNZ)	2× Platinum	60,000^{‡}
Portugal (AFP)	Gold	5,000^{‡}
United Kingdom (BPI)	Platinum	600,000^{‡}
United States (RIAA)	2× Platinum	2,000,000^{‡}
Streaming
Central America (CFC)	Gold	3,500,000^{†}
^{‡} Sales+streaming figures based on certification alone.^{†} Streaming-only figures based on certification alone.

== Release history ==
Region	Date	Format	Label	Ref.
United States	October 8, 2024	Contemporary hit radio	Island	
Various	January 10, 2025	7-inch vinyl	Island	
