= Assertion =

Assertion or assert may refer to:

== Computing ==
- Assertion (software development), a computer programming technique
- assert.h, a header file in the standard library of the C programming language
- Assertion definition language, a specification language providing a formal grammar to specify behaviour and interfaces for computer software

== Logic and language ==
- Logical assertion, a statement that asserts that a certain premise is true
- Proof by assertion, an informal fallacy in which a proposition is repeatedly restated
- Time of assertion, in linguistics a secondary temporal reference in establishing tense
- Assertive, a speech act that commits a speaker to the truth of the expressed proposition

== Other uses ==
- Assert (horse) (1979–1995), an Irish racehorse
- Assertions (auditing), the set of information that the statement preparer is providing in a financial statement audit
