= Sharpest Tool =

Song by Sabrina Carpenter

from the album Short n' Sweet
- Released: August 23, 2024
- Genre: Chamber pop
- Length: 3:38
- Label: Island
- Songwriters: Sabrina Carpenter; Amy Allen; Jack Antonoff
- Producer: Jack Antonoff

Lyric video
- “Sharpest Tool” on YouTube

"Sharpest Tool" is a song by the American singer Sabrina Carpenter from her sixth studio album, Short n' Sweet (2024). Carpenter wrote it with songwriter Amy Allen and its producer, Jack Antonoff. The song became available as the album's fourth track on August 23, 2024, when it was released by Island Records.

== Background ==
In January 2021, Sabrina Carpenter signed a recording contract with Island Records. She announced that she was working on her sixth studio album in March 2024, exploring new genres and expecting that it would herald a new chapter in her life. In anticipation of her performance at Coachella, Carpenter announced that a single called "Espresso" would be released on April 11, 2024. The song was a surprise success, becoming her first number one single on the Billboard Global 200 chart and her first song to enter the top 10 on the Billboard Hot 100. She followed this with "Please Please Please" (2024), which reached number one on the Billboard Hot 100.

Preceding an official announcement, billboards bearing tweets about Carpenter's height began appearing throughout New York City. On June 3, 2024, she announced that the album, titled Short n' Sweet, would be released by Island Records on August 23, 2024, and revealed its cover artwork. The tracklist was revealed on July 9, 2024.

Carpenter wrote the song "Sharpest Tool" with songwriter Amy Allen and its producer, Jack Antonoff. The song became available for digital download on the album, which was released on August 23, 2024.

== Composition ==
"Sharpest Tool" is three minutes and 38 seconds long. Billboard's Jason Lipshutz thought that "the picked guitar strings leading to the syncopated beat recalls some of the best moments of the 1975's pop opus Being Funny in a Foreign Language". It has been described as a chamber pop song.

In the lyrics of "Sharpest Tool", Carpenter expresses frustration with a partner who is easily distracted and forgetful, highlighting how he neglects meaningful communication until he feels guilty. She describes a shallow relationship where, despite their intimacy and meeting his friends, he remains emotionally distant, only reaching out with a casual message when guilt sets in. She later reflects on how the relationship took an unexpected turn, leaving her questioning everything. She doubts whether their connection was ever serious, feeling foolish for believing it was. Carpenter searches for clarity in their unclear communication, realizing that while both are unhappy, they avoid addressing the underlying issues. She highlights the secrecy in their relationship, as he always kept his phone hidden, and notes how she went from being someone he loved to someone he resents, seemingly overnight.

== Critical reception ==
Lipshutz ranked "Sharpest Tool" eighth among the twelve album tracks; he noted the production as typical of Antonoff but thought Carpenter "amplifies the sorrowful corners with unmasked anger and hurt, and elevates the arrangement as a whole".

== Commercial performance ==
"Sharpest Tool" debuted at number 21 on the US Billboard Hot 100 issued for September 7, 2024. In Canada, the song entered at number 27 on the Canadian Hot 100 issued for the same date. In the United Kingdom, it debuted at number 30 on the Official Audio Streaming Chart. In Australia, "Sharpest Tool" entered at number 20. The song debuted at number 20 in New Zealand. It charted at number 23 on the Billboard Global 200. "Sharpest Tool" also reached national record charts at number 23 in Singapore and number 42 in Portugal.

== Credits and personnel ==
Credits are adapted from the liner notes of Short n' Sweet.

- Jack Antonoff – producer, songwriter, drums, acoustic guitar, electric guitar, percussion, drum programming, synthesizer, sitar, Wurlitzer electric piano
- Sabrina Carpenter – vocals, songwriter
- Amy Allen – songwriter
- Laura Sisk – engineer
- Oli Jacobs – engineer
- Jack Manning – engineering assistance
- Joey Miller – engineering assistance
- Jozef Caldwell – engineering assistance
- Ruairi O'Flaherty – mastering
- Serban Ghenea – mixing
- Bryce Bordone, mix engineer

== Charts ==
Chart positions for "Sharpest Tool"
Chart (2024)	Peak position
Australia (ARIA)	20
Canada Hot 100 (Billboard)	27
Global 200 (Billboard)	23
New Zealand (Recorded Music NZ)	20
Philippines Hot 100 (Billboard)	92
Portugal (AFP)	42
Singapore (RIAS)	23
UK Streaming (OCC)	30
US Billboard Hot 100	21

== Certifications ==
Certifications for "Sharpest Tool"
Region	Certification	Certified units/sales
Australia (ARIA)	Gold	35,000^{‡}
Brazil (Pro-Música Brasil)	Platinum	40,000^{‡}
Canada (Music Canada)	Platinum	80,000^{‡}
New Zealand (RMNZ)	Gold	15,000^{‡}
United Kingdom (BPI)	Silver	200,000^{‡}
United States (RIAA)	Gold	500,000^{‡}
^{‡} Sales+streaming figures based on certification alone.
