= Busy Woman =

Single by Sabrina Carpenter

from the album Short n' Sweet (Deluxe)
- Released: March 7, 2025 (Note: Originally released as an exclusive vinyl bonus track on August 29, 2024. Re-released alongside the deluxe version of the album on February 14, 2025.)
- Recorded: 2024
- Studio: Sharp Sonics (Los Angeles); Electric Lady (New York City)
- Genre: Dance-pop; synth-pop
- Length: 3:06
- Label: Island
- Songwriters: Sabrina Carpenter; Amy Allen; Jack Antonoff
- Producer: Jack Antonoff

Sabrina Carpenter singles chronology
"Bed Chem" (2024)	"Busy Woman" (2025)	"Manchild" (2025)

Lyric video
- “Busy Woman” on YouTube

"Busy Woman" is a song by American singer Sabrina Carpenter from the 2025 deluxe edition of her sixth studio album, Short n' Sweet (2024). Carpenter wrote the song with the songwriter Amy Allen and its producer, Jack Antonoff. It was initially available as the 13th track on the limited edition of the album, released by Island Records on August 29, 2024. Carpenter performed it as a surprise addition on select dates of her Short n' Sweet Tour (2024–2025) before its inclusion in the album's deluxe edition on February 14, 2025. UMG Recordings sent it to radio stations as a single on March 7, 2025.

== Background and release ==
In January 2021, Sabrina Carpenter signed a recording contract with Island Records. She announced that she was working on her sixth studio album in March 2024, exploring new genres and expecting that it would herald a new chapter in her life. In anticipation of her performance at Coachella, Carpenter announced that a single called "Espresso" would be released on April 11, 2024. The song was a surprise success, becoming her first number one single on the Billboard Global 200 chart and her first song to enter the top 10 on the Billboard Hot 100. She followed this with "Please Please Please" in June, which reached number one on the Billboard Hot 100.

Preceding an official announcement, billboards bearing tweets about Carpenter's height (4'11"), such as "when I say I hate short people, sabrina carpenter is NEVER included"," began appearing throughout New York City. On June 3, 2024, she announced the album, titled Short n' Sweet, and revealed its cover artwork. It was released on August 23, 2024. While Short n' Sweet competed with the reissue of Travis Scott's mixtape Days Before Rodeo (2014) to secure a number one debut on the Billboard 200, both artists released digital variant editions to boost sales. On August 29, Carpenter released a limited digital download edition of her album, titled Short n' Sweet(er). It included the song "Busy Woman", about which she stated: "I wrote 'Busy Woman' with Jack and Amy just after I turned in Short n' Sweet and was so sad I couldn't include it. It's one of my favorites so I wanted to give it to you as a thank you for all of the love!!!!!"

On February 4, 2025, Carpenter announced that a deluxe edition of Short n' Sweet, which would include "Busy Woman", was set to be released on February 14. This was intended as a "thank you" to her fans in celebration of her winning two Grammy Awards at the 67th ceremony.

== Composition ==
"Busy Woman" is three minutes and six seconds long. Carpenter wrote the song with Amy Allen and its producer, Jack Antonoff. It was recorded at Sharp Sonics Studios in Los Angeles and Electric Lady Studios in New York City. Antonoff plays percussion, bass, synthesizer, sitar, acoustic guitar, electric guitar, drumkit, and drum programming; Carpenter plays percussion; and Bobby Hawk plays violin. Antonoff, Jack Manning, Laura Sisk, and Oli Jacobs engineered "Busy Woman" with assistance from Joey Miller and Jozef Caldwell; Ruairi O'Flaherty mastered the song, and Serban Ghenea mixed it with assistance from Bryce Bordone. The song is a dance-pop and synth-pop track with elements of pop, yacht rock, disco, country, and country pop. Constructed in the verse-chorus form.

In "Busy Woman," Carpenter humorously addresses the challenges she faces with rejection. The song starts with her admitting that, despite usually being calm and rational, she loses all composure when turned down. In the first verse, she sings about how rejection feels immoral to her and how it can make her react in an exaggerated and dramatic way. She emphasizes that if the subject is interested in her, she will be the ideal partner and be willing to go above and beyond. In case the feelings are not reciprocated, she will casually brush it off and act indifferent as she is too busy for anything less than what she deserves.

In the chorus, Carpenter expresses how she will make herself available if someone wants her, but if not, she would be completely fine and not interested anymore. She sings about being able to turn her attention elsewhere. In the second verse, Carpenter continues to mock her own flexibility in relationships, offering to adapt to her partner's needs but also jokingly claiming she will dismiss someone as "gay" if they are not attracted to her: "Tantric yoga, baby, namaste / If you don't want me, I'll just deem you gay."

The song is composed in a key of G major and features a tempo of 117 beats per minute in a common time.

== Critical reception ==
Nylon's Samantha Leach believed that "Busy Woman" had "all the hallmarks of Carpenter hit. It's punchy, thirsty, and funny as hell." According to Billboard's Jason Lipshutz, the song "sounds like it could be Carpenter’s next innuendo-heavy smash". Paper thought it was weaker than Carpenter's best material but "still stronger than nearly anyone else on the charts".

== Commercial performance ==
"Busy Woman" debuted at number 10 on the UK Singles Chart issued for February 21, 2025. It became Carpenter's fifth top-ten single in the UK. In Australia, the song entered at number 22. It debuted at number 20 in New Zealand. "Busy Woman" also reached national record charts at number 7 in Ireland, number 16 in Norway, number 49 in Sweden, number 55 in the Netherlands, and number 85 in Lithuania.

== Live performances ==
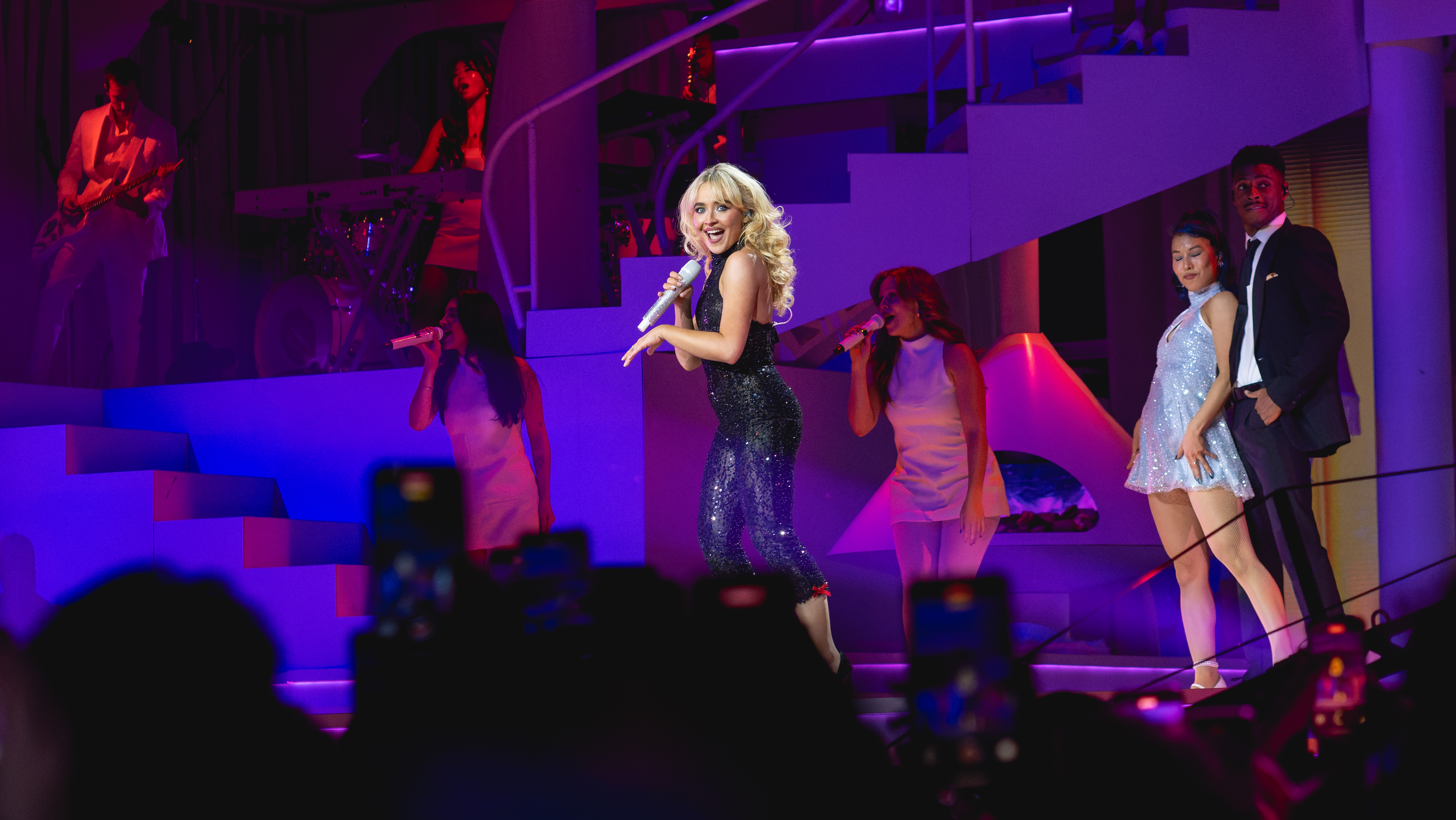
Carpenter performing "Busy Woman" on the Short n' Sweet Tour in 2025

Carpenter has performed "Busy Woman" as a surprise song on some dates of her fifth concert tour, the Short n' Sweet Tour (2024–2025), which is decided by Carpenter and her dancers playing a game of spin the bottle. It was later officially included in the European leg of the tour. Leach described the song's performance as "far and away the highlight of my evening".

== Credits and personnel ==
Credits are adapted from the liner notes of Short n' Sweet (Deluxe).

- Jack Antonoff – producer, engineer, percussion, bass, synthesizer, sitar, songwriter, recording engineer, acoustic guitar, electric guitar, drumkit, drum programming, vocal programming
- Sabrina Carpenter – percussion, vocals, songwriter
- Amy Allen – songwriter
- Bobby Hawk – violin
- Jack Manning – engineer
- Laura Sisk – engineer, recording engineer
- Oli Jacobs – engineer, recording engineer
- Joey Miller – second engineer
- Jozef Caldwell – second engineer
- Ruairi O'Flaherty – mastering
- Serban Ghenea – mixing
- Bryce Bordone – mix engineer

== Charts ==
=== Weekly charts ===
Chart (2025–2026)	Peak position
Australia (ARIA)	22
Canada Hot 100 (Billboard)	38
CIS Airplay (TopHit)	78
Croatia International Airplay (Top lista)	19
Denmark (Tracklisten)	36
Estonia Airplay (TopHit)	10
Global 200 (Billboard)	23
Greece International (IFPI)	48
Ireland (IRMA)	5
Israel International Airplay (Media Forest)	1
Japan Hot Overseas (Billboard Japan)	9
Latvia Airplay (LaIPA)	5
Lebanon English (Lebanese Top 20)	11
Lithuania (AGATA)	85
Lithuania Airplay (TopHit)	16
Malta Airplay (Radiomonitor)	16
Netherlands (Single Top 100)	55
New Zealand (Recorded Music NZ)	20
Nicaragua Airplay (Monitor Latino)	16
Nigeria (TurnTable Top 100)	89
Norway (VG-lista)	16
Philippines (Philippines Hot 100)	80
Poland (Polish Airplay Top 100)	10
Romania Airplay (TopHit)	79
San Marino Airplay (SMRTV Top 50)	46
Singapore (RIAS)	26
Slovakia Airplay (ČNS IFPI)	32
Sweden (Sverigetopplistan)	49
UK Singles (Official Charts)	6
US Billboard Hot 100	27
US Adult Pop Airplay (Billboard)	36
US Pop Airplay (Billboard)	20
Venezuela Anglo Airplay (Monitor Latino)	3

=== Monthly charts ===
Chart (2025)	Peak position
CIS Airplay (TopHit)	88
Estonia Airplay (TopHit)	16
Lithuania Airplay (TopHit)	36

=== Year-end charts ===
Year-end chart performance for "Busy Woman"
Chart (2025)	Position
Estonia Airplay (TopHit)	131
Lithuania Airplay (TopHit)	146
UK Singles (OCC)	49

== Certifications ==
Certifications
Region	Certification	Certified units/sales
Australia (ARIA)	Platinum	70,000^{‡}
Brazil (Pro-Música Brasil)	3× Platinum	120,000^{‡}
Canada (Music Canada)	Platinum	80,000^{‡}
New Zealand (RMNZ)	Platinum	30,000^{‡}
United Kingdom (BPI)	Platinum	600,000^{‡}
United States (RIAA)	Platinum	1,000,000^{‡}
^{‡} Sales+streaming figures based on certification alone.

== Release history ==
Region	Date	Format	Label	Ref.
Italy	March 7, 2025	Radio airplay	Universal	
United States	April 8, 2025	Contemporary hit radio	Island	
