= Slim Pickins =

Song by Sabrina Carpenter

from the album Short n' Sweet
- Released: August 23, 2024
- Studio: Sharp Sonics (Los Angeles); Electric Lady (New York City); Big Mercy Sound (New York City)
- Genre: Country; country pop; folk-pop
- Length: 2:32
- Label: Island
- Songwriters: Sabrina Carpenter; Amy Allen; Jack Antonoff
- Producer: Jack Antonoff

Lyric video
- “Slim Pickins” on YouTube

"Slim Pickins" (taken from the saying "slim pickings") is a song by American singer Sabrina Carpenter from her sixth studio album Short n' Sweet (2024). Carpenter wrote it with Amy Allen and its producer, Jack Antonoff. The song became available as the album's ninth track on August 23, 2024, when it was released by Island Records. A country, country pop, and folk-pop ballad, "Slim Pickins" has lyrics in which she expresses her dismay about the scarcity of suitable men to date. Carpenter premiered the song at the Grammy Museum at L.A. Live on August 2, ahead of its release.

== Background ==
In January 2021, Sabrina Carpenter signed a recording contract with Island Records. She announced that she was working on her sixth studio album in March 2024, exploring new genres and expecting that it would herald a new chapter in her life. In anticipation of her performance at Coachella, Carpenter announced that a single called "Espresso" would be released on April 11, 2024. The song was a surprise success, becoming her first number one single on the Billboard Global 200 chart and her first song to enter the top 10 on the Billboard Hot 100. She followed this with "Please Please Please" (2024), which reached number one on the Billboard Hot 100.

Preceding an official announcement, billboards bearing tweets about Carpenter's height began appearing throughout New York City. On June 3, 2024, she announced that the album, titled Short n' Sweet, would be released by Island Records on August 23, 2024, and revealed its cover artwork. The tracklist was revealed on July 9, 2024.

== Composition ==
"Slim Pickins" is two minutes and 32 seconds long. Carpenter wrote the song with Amy Allen and its producer, Jack Antonoff. It was recorded at Sharp Sonics Studios in Los Angeles and Electric Lady Studios and Big Mercy Sound in New York City. Antonoff plays drums, acoustic guitar, percussion, and drum programming; Sean Hutchinson plays drums and percussion; Mikey Freedom Hart plays slide guitar; Francisco Ojeda plays double bass; and Bobby Hawk plays violin. Mikey Freedom Hart, David Hart, Jack Manning, Laura Sisk, and Oli Jacobs engineered "Slim Pickins" with assistance from Joey Miller and Jozef Caldwell; Serban Ghenea mixed the song at MixStar Studios in Virginia Beach with engineering from Bryce Bordone; and Ruairi O'Flaherty mastered it.

"Slim Pickins" is a country, country pop, and folk-pop ballad, in which she expresses regret over the scarcity of suitable men to date. In the chorus, the narrator resigns herself to settling for someone less ideal to satisfy her needs, lamenting that good suitors are either unavailable or already taken, vowing to continue voicing her dissatisfaction. She goes on to point out that her boyfriend lacks basic grammatical knowledge about the difference between the words "their", "there", and "they are"; although he is oblivious to what he is lacking in life and clearly not living up to his potential, he is sexually involved with the narrator. In the outro, she jokes that since good men tend to drunkenly call their exes and she never had a "gay awakening", she will continue to be stuck in a kitchen while complaining: "Then I'll just be here in the kitchen / Serving up some moanin' and bitchin'."

== Critical reception ==
American Songwriter's Alex Hopper believed that with "Slim Pickins", Carpenter created the ideal song for the dilemma of searching for the right partner amidst a crowd of wrong ones, encapsulating a feeling that many people wish to experience. He thought the verses showed that Carpenter was not hesitant to push the boundaries of what is typically expected in a pop song: "As always, Carpenter doesn't air her frustrations without a hint of humor [...] She lists off humorous–though deeply relatable–'icks' one could have with a partner." In a ranking of the album's tracks, Billboard placed the song last.

== Commercial performance ==
"Slim Pickins" debuted at number 27 on the US Billboard Hot 100 issued for September 7, 2024. In Canada, the song entered at number 33 on the Canadian Hot 100 issued for the same date. In the United Kingdom, it debuted at number 36 on the Official Audio Streaming Chart. In Australia, "Slim Pickins" entered at number 24. The song debuted at number 28 in New Zealand. It charted at number 30 on the Billboard Global 200. "Slim Pickins" also reached the national record chart at number 72 in Portugal.

== Live performances ==
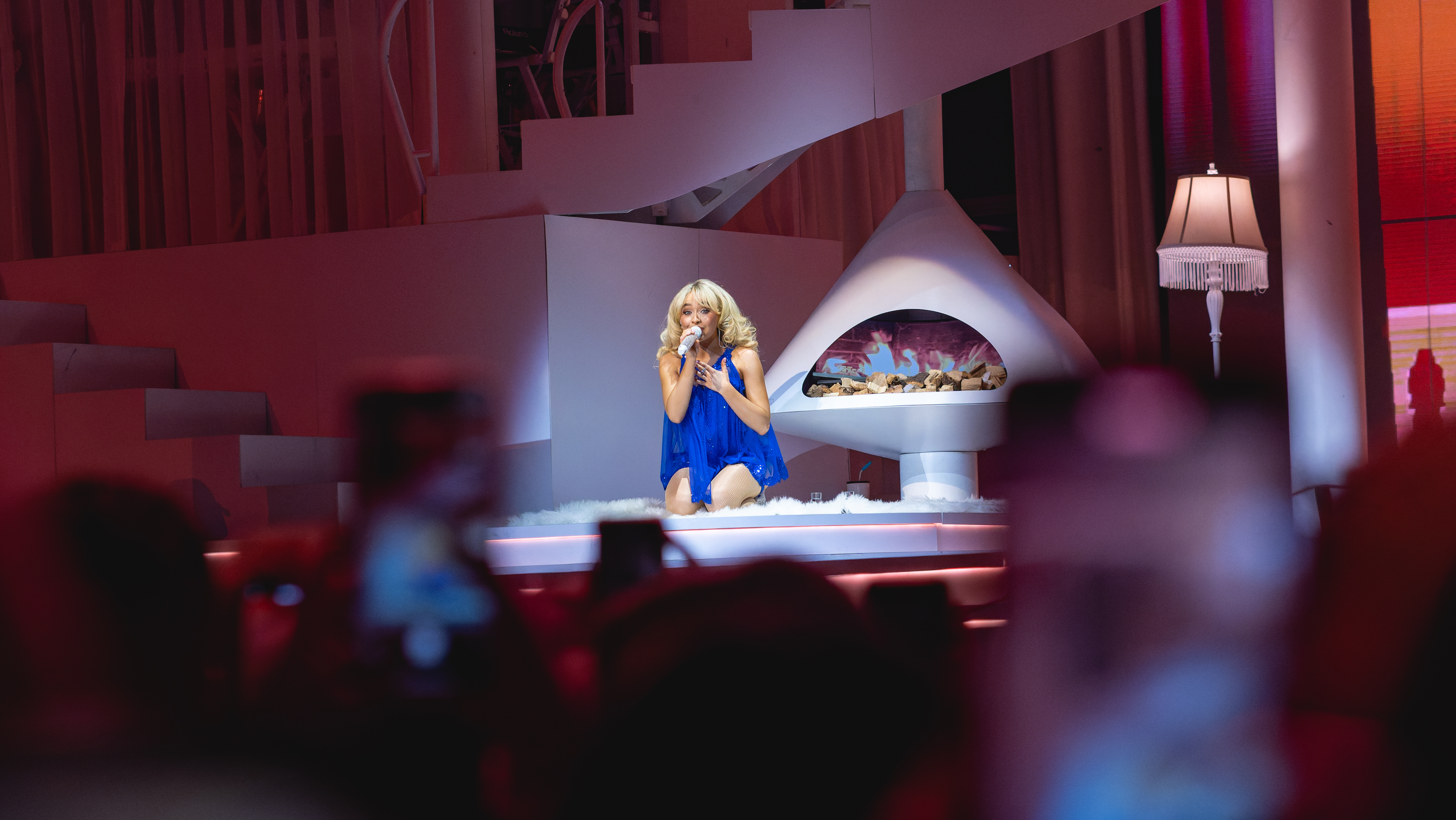
Carpenter performing "Slim Pickins" on the Short n' Sweet Tour in 2025

Carpenter premiered "Slim Pickins" at the Grammy Museum at L.A. Live on August 2, ahead of its release. She performed a stripped-down version of the song, while sitting on a stool, with minimal instrumental accompaniment from Antonoff. While introducing it, Carpenter said "This one's cute and I just like, wanted to sing it for you today. Super random of me so it's called 'Slim Pickins' and I hope you like it." Teen Vogue considered the performance "intimate", and Capital described "Slim Pickins" as a "gorgeous, bittersweet country inspired ballad" based on it.

== Credits and personnel ==
Credits are adapted from the liner notes of Short n' Sweet.

- Jack Antonoff – producer, songwriter, drums, acoustic guitar, percussion, drum programming
- Sabrina Carpenter – vocals, songwriter
- Amy Allen – songwriter
- Sean Hutchinson – drums, percussion
- Mikey Freedom Hart – slide guitar, engineering
- Francisco Ojeda – double bass
- Bobby Hawk – violin
- David Hart – engineering
- Jack Manning – engineering
- Laura Sisk – engineering
- Oli Jacobs – engineering
- Joey Miller – engineering assistance
- Jozef Caldwell – engineering assistance
- Ruairi O'Flaherty – mastering
- Serban Ghenea – mixing
- Bryce Bordone – mix engineering

== Charts ==
Chart performance for "Slim Pickins"
Chart (2024)	Peak position
Australia (ARIA)	24
Canada Hot 100 (Billboard)	33
Global 200 (Billboard)	30
New Zealand (Recorded Music NZ)	28
Portugal (AFP)	72
UK Streaming (OCC)	36
US Billboard Hot 100	27

== Certifications ==
Certifications for "Slim Pickins"
Region	Certification	Certified units/sales
Australia (ARIA)	Gold	35,000^{‡}
Brazil (Pro-Música Brasil)	Platinum	40,000^{‡}
Canada (Music Canada)	Gold	40,000^{‡}
New Zealand (RMNZ)	Gold	15,000^{‡}
United Kingdom (BPI)	Silver	200,000^{‡}
United States (RIAA)	Gold	500,000^{‡}
^{‡} Sales+streaming figures based on certification alone.
