= Short n' Sweet Tour =

2024–2025 concert tour by Sabrina Carpenter

- Tour by Sabrina Carpenter
- Promotional poster
- Location: Europe; North America
- Associated album: Short n' Sweet
- Start date: September 23, 2024
- End date: November 23, 2025
- No. of shows: 70
- Supporting acts: Amaarae; Beabadoobee; Rachel Chinouriri; Clairo; Olivia Dean; Griff; Ravyn Lenae; Amber Mark; Declan McKenna
- Attendance: 975,500
- Box office: $125.6 million

Sabrina Carpenter concert chronology
- Emails I Can't Send Tour (2022–2023); Short n' Sweet Tour (2024–2025)

The Short n' Sweet Tour was the fifth concert tour by the American singer Sabrina Carpenter to promote her sixth studio album, Short n' Sweet (2024). It commenced on September 23, 2024, in Columbus, United States, and concluded on November 23, 2025, in Los Angeles, United States, consisting of 70 shows.

== Announcements ==
Carpenter announced the North American dates for the tour on June 20, 2024. European dates were announced on July 23, 2024. On December 2, 2024, additional dates for the European leg were announced. On February 27, 2025, twelve additional concerts in North America were announced. The following day, five additional New York and Los Angeles dates were revealed.

== Concert synopsis ==
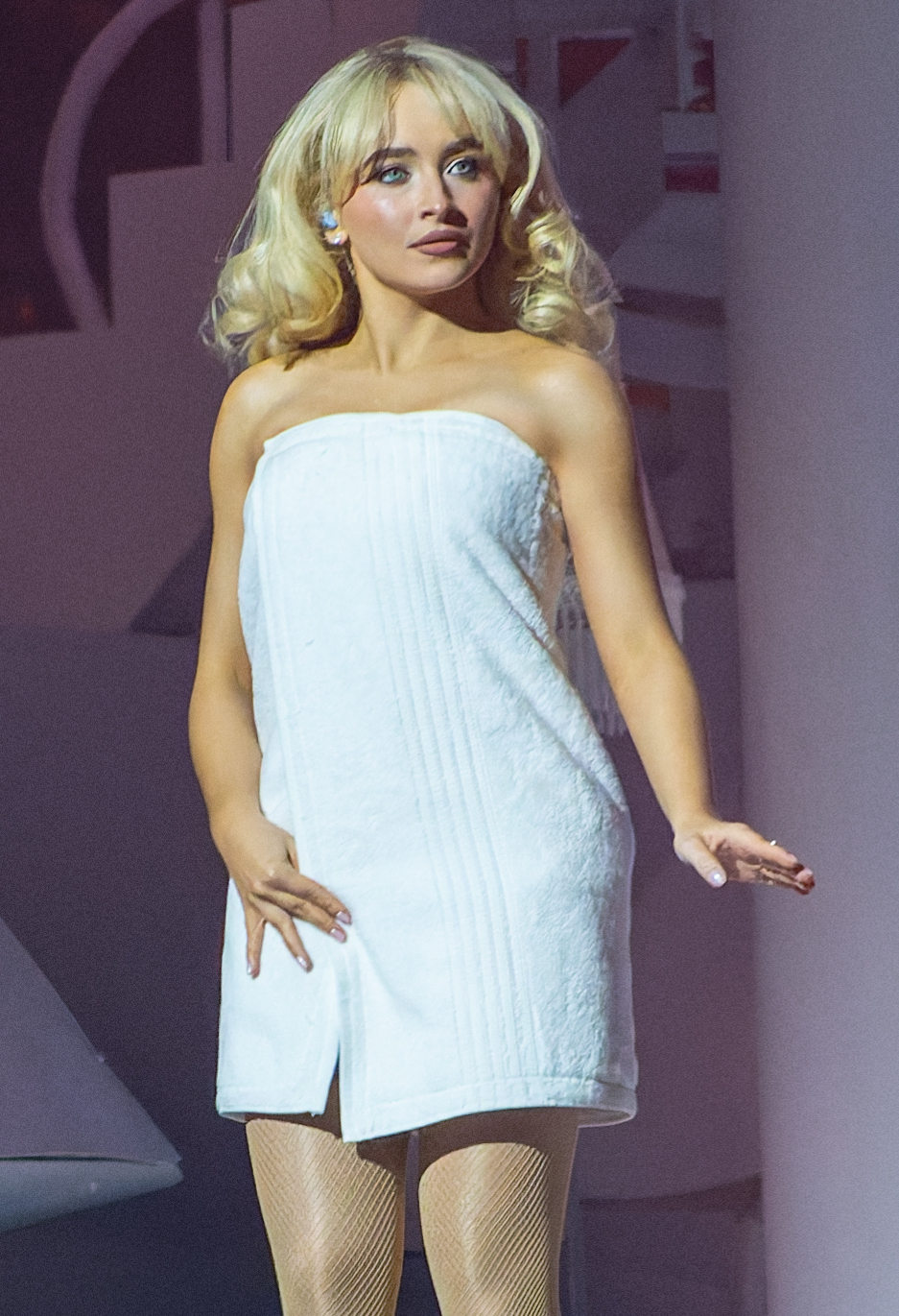
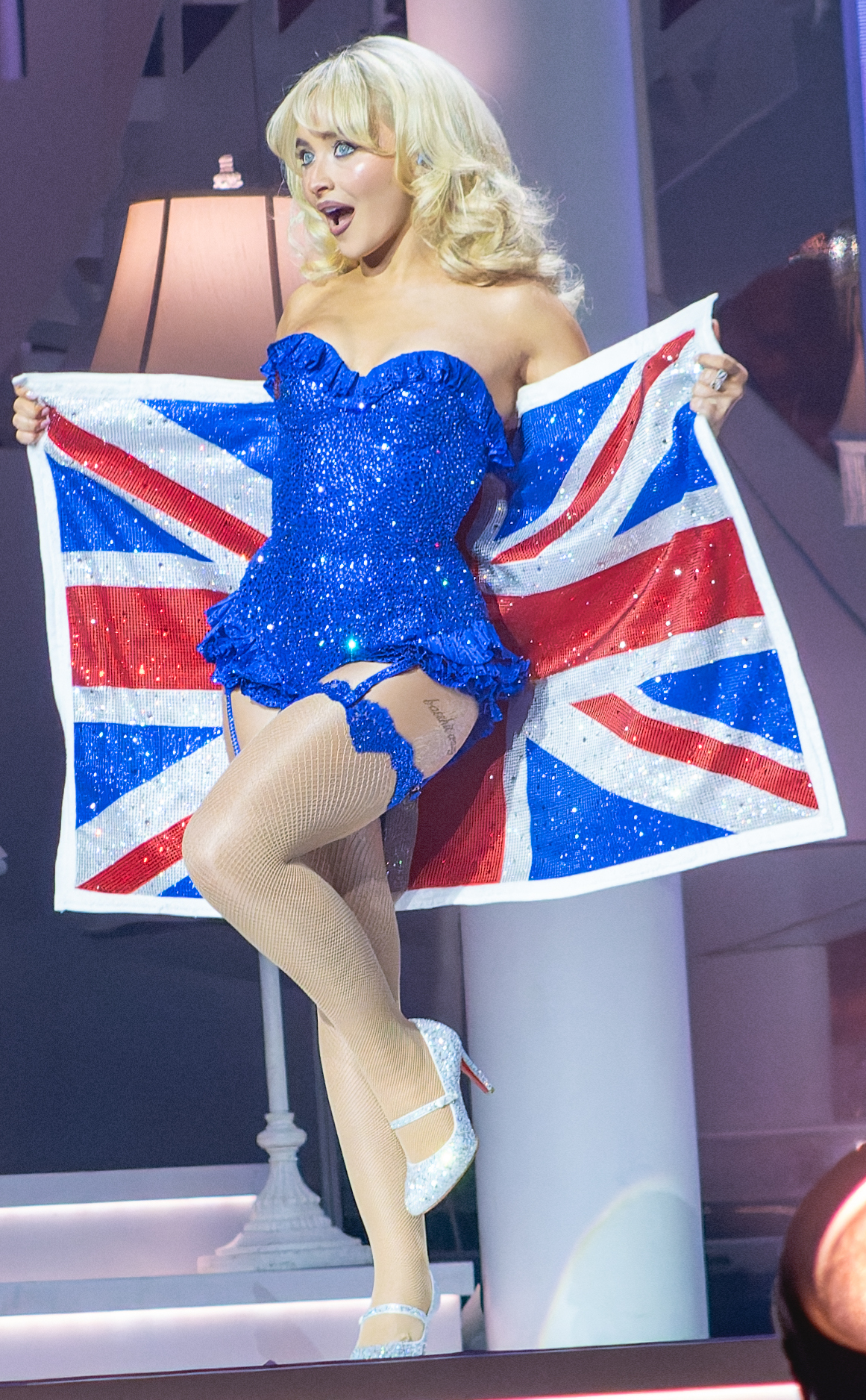
Carpenter opening the towel and revealing the bodysuit during a show at the O_{2} Arena in London

At the beginning, a video of Carpenter in the bath is shown, with the narrator reminding her of the show. She rushes out the bath and comes onto the stage wearing a towel. Carpenter then opens the towel to reveal a babydoll nightgown with garters. She opens the show with "Taste" and "Good Graces", with her dancers. This is followed by a welcome note where Carpenter thanks her opening act, followed by a performance of "Slim Pickins" by the fireplace and "Tornado Warnings" with a male backup dancer. She ends the set with "Lie to Girls" with female dancers and a short snippet of "Decode". Carpenter opens the next set with a fictional advertisement, followed by a performance of "Bed Chem" in a round shaped bed with female dancers.

The next set opens with an intro to a fictional sitcom, "Sabrina After Dark", where her band and backup singers are introduced and she appears in a custom Patou black lace jumpsuit followed by a jazz rendition of "Feather". Carpenter proceeds to perform "Fast Times" and "Read Your Mind". Carpenter later enters a bathroom while performing "Sharpest Tool", followed by a short snippet of "Opposite". She proceeds to perform "Because I Liked a Boy" and "Coincidence" before spinning a bottle to determine a surprise cover song to perform; "Busy Woman", a bonus track, was sometimes performed instead. Carpenter then proceeds to perform "Nonsense", before closing a set with a satirical "Technical Difficulties" screen in place of a custom outro.

The narrator then reappears, recapping the previous highlights of the tour, before Carpenter rushes to him to chastise him about the technical difficulty before firing him out of anger. Two advertisements are shown that lead up to a performance of "Dumb & Poetic", where she appears in a Ludovic de Saint Sernin two-piece dress. She then passes pink handcuffs to an audience member, with an "under arrest for being too hot" alert being displayed on the screen, before proceeding with "Juno". While singing "have you ever tried this one?", Carpenter teases new sex positions at every show. She proceeds with a performance of "Please Please Please" and "Don't Smile" before encoring with "Espresso".

== Accolades ==
Accolades
Year	Organization	Category	Recipient(s)	Result	Ref.
2025	iHeartRadio Music Awards	Favorite Tour Photographer	Alfredo Flores	Won	
2025	iHeartRadio Music Awards	Favorite Tour Style	Short n' Sweet Tour	Nominated	
2025	iHeartRadio Music Awards	Favorite Tour Tradition	"Juno" position	Nominated	
2026	iHeartRadio Music Awards	Favorite Tour Style	Short n' Sweet Tour	Nominated	
2026	iHeartRadio Music Awards	Favorite Tour Tradition	Celebrity "Juno" arrest	Nominated	
2026	Pollstar Awards	Major Tour of the Year	Short n' Sweet Tour	Nominated	
2026	Pollstar Awards	Pop Tour of the Year	Short n' Sweet Tour	Nominated	
2026	Pollstar Awards	Support or Special Guest of the Year	Olivia Dean	Won	
2026	Pollstar Awards	Road Warrior of the Year	David Klein	Nominated	

== Set list ==
This set list is from the September 23, 2024, concert in Columbus. It is not intended to represent all concerts for the tour.

1. "Taste"
2. "Good Graces"
3. "Slim Pickins"
4. "Tornado Warnings"
5. "Lie to Girls" / "Decode"
6. "Bed Chem"
7. "Feather"
8. "Fast Times"
9. "Read Your Mind"
10. "Sharpest Tool" / "Opposite"
11. "Because I Liked a Boy"
12. "Coincidence"
13. Surprise cover song
14. "Nonsense"
15. "Dumb & Poetic"
16. "Juno"
17. "Please Please Please"
18. "Don't Smile"

Encore

19. "Espresso"

=== Alterations ===
- Beginning with the March 3, 2025, concert in Dublin, "Busy Woman" was performed in replacement of "Read Your Mind" to promote the deluxe version of Short n' Sweet.
- Beginning with the October 23, 2025, concert in Pittsburgh, three songs from her new album Man's Best Friend were added to the set list:
  - "Manchild" was performed succeeding "Good Graces" and preceding "Slim Pickins".
  - "House Tour" was performed succeeding the surprise cover song and preceding "Nonsense".
  - "Tears" was performed succeeding "Please, Please, Please" and preceding "Don't Smile".

=== Surprise cover songs ===
Every night on the tour, Carpenter played spin the bottle on stage to select a song to cover.

- September 23, 2024 – Columbus: "Mamma Mia" by ABBA
- September 25, 2024 – Toronto: "That Don't Impress Me Much" by Shania Twain
- September 26, 2024 – Detroit: "Kiss Me" by Sixpence None the Richer
- September 29, 2024 – New York City: "Mamma Mia" by ABBA
- September 30, 2024 – Brooklyn: "Busy Woman" by Carpenter
- October 2, 2024 – Hartford: "Kiss Me" by Sixpence None the Richer
- October 3, 2024 – Boston: "Mamma Mia" by ABBA
- October 5, 2024 – Baltimore: "Material Girl" by Madonna
- October 8, 2024 – Philadelphia: "Busy Woman" by Carpenter
- October 11, 2024 – Montreal: "Kiss Me" by Sixpence None the Richer
- October 13, 2024 – Chicago: "Mamma Mia" by ABBA
- October 14, 2024 – Minneapolis: "Material Girl" by Madonna
- October 16, 2024 – Nashville: "9 to 5" by Dolly Parton
- October 17, 2024 – St. Louis: "Mamma Mia" by ABBA
- October 19, 2024 – Raleigh: "Material Girl" by Madonna
- October 20, 2024 – Charlottesville: "Kiss Me" by Sixpence None the Richer
- October 22, 2024 – Atlanta: "9 to 5" by Parton
- October 24, 2024 – Orlando: "Mamma Mia" by ABBA
- October 25, 2024 – Tampa: "Material Girl" by Madonna
- October 27, 2024 – Houston: "Busy Woman" by Carpenter
- October 28, 2024 – Austin: "9 to 5" by Parton
- October 30, 2024 – Dallas: "Hopelessly Devoted to You" by Olivia Newton-John
- November 1, 2024 – Denver: "Mamma Mia" by ABBA
- November 2, 2024 – Salt Lake City: "Material Girl" by Madonna
- November 4, 2024 – Vancouver: "Busy Woman" by Carpenter
- November 6, 2024 – Seattle: "Mamma Mia" by ABBA
- November 7, 2024 – Portland: "9 to 5" by Parton
- November 9, 2024 – San Francisco: "Kiss Me" by Sixpence None the Richer
- November 10, 2024 – San Diego: "Material Girl" by Madonna
- November 13, 2024 – Phoenix: "9 to 5" by Parton
- November 15, 2024 – Los Angeles: "Ain't No Other Man" / "What a Girl Wants" by Christina Aguilera (with Aguilera)
- November 17, 2024 – Inglewood: "Mamma Mia" by ABBA
- November 18, 2024 – Inglewood: "Super Freak" by Rick James
- March 3, 2025 – Dublin: "15 Minutes" by Carpenter
- March 4, 2025 – Dublin: "Bad Reviews" by Carpenter
- March 6, 2025 – Birmingham: "Mamma Mia" by ABBA
- March 8, 2025 – London: "Couldn't Make It Any Harder" by Carpenter
- March 9, 2025 – London: "Come On Eileen" by Dexys Midnight Runners
- March 11, 2025 – Glasgow: "Bad Reviews" by Carpenter
- March 13, 2025 – Manchester: "Mamma Mia" by ABBA
- March 14, 2025 – Manchester: "15 Minutes" by Carpenter
- March 16, 2025 – Paris: "Paris" by Carpenter
- March 17, 2025 – Paris: "Lady Marmalade" by Labelle
- March 19, 2025 – Berlin: "Mamma Mia" by ABBA
- March 22, 2025 – Brussels: "Couldn't Make It Any Harder" by Carpenter
- March 23, 2025 – Amsterdam: "15 Minutes" by Carpenter
- March 26, 2025 – Assago: (Note: Labeled as Milan in press material.) "Mamma Mia" by ABBA
- March 27, 2025 – Zürich: "Bad Reviews" by Carpenter
- March 30, 2025 – Oslo: "Material Girl" by Madonna
- March 31, 2025 – Copenhagen: "Couldn't Make It Any Harder" by Carpenter
- April 1, 2025 – Copenhagen: "15 Minutes" by Carpenter
- April 3, 2025 – Stockholm: "Mamma Mia" by ABBA
- April 4, 2025 – Stockholm: "Lay All Your Love on Me" by ABBA
- October 23, 2025 – Pittsburgh: "Nobody's Son" by Carpenter
- October 24, 2025 – Pittsburgh: "15 Minutes" by Carpenter
- October 26, 2025 – New York City: "Go Go Juice" by Carpenter
- October 28, 2025 – New York City: "Mamma Mia" by ABBA
- October 29, 2025 – New York City: "Nobody's Son" by Carpenter
- October 31, 2025 – New York City: "Barbie Girl" by Aqua
- November 1, 2025 – New York City: "Couldn't Make it Any Harder" by Carpenter
- November 4, 2025 – Nashville: "Go Go Juice" by Carpenter
- November 5, 2025 – Nashville: "Nobody's Son" by Carpenter
- November 10, 2025 – Toronto: "My Man on Willpower" by Carpenter
- November 11, 2025 – Toronto: "Bad Reviews" by Carpenter
- November 16, 2025 – Los Angeles: "Nobody's Son" by Carpenter
- November 17, 2025 – Los Angeles: "15 Minutes" by Carpenter
- November 19, 2025 – Los Angeles: "Go Go Juice" by Carpenter
- November 20, 2025 – Los Angeles: "My Man on Willpower" by Carpenter
- November 22, 2025 – Los Angeles: "Nobody's Son" by Carpenter
- November 23, 2025 – Los Angeles: "Goodbye" by Carpenter

== Tour dates ==
List of 2024 concerts
Date (2024)	City	Country	Venue	Supporting acts	Attendance	Revenue
September 23	Columbus	United States	Nationwide Arena	Amaarae	12,841 / 12,841	$1,899,837
September 25	Toronto	Canada	Scotiabank Arena	Amaarae	13,389 / 13,389	$1,445,190
September 26	Detroit	United States	Little Caesars Arena	Amaarae	13,800 / 13,800	$1,664,304
September 29	New York City	United States	Madison Square Garden	Amaarae	13,985 / 13,985	$1,935,205
September 30	Brooklyn	United States	Barclays Center	Amaarae	14,155 / 14,155	$1,907,779
October 2	Hartford	United States	XL Center	Amaarae	11,414 / 11,414	$1,389,415
October 3	Boston	United States	TD Garden	Amaarae	13,615 / 13,615	$1,934,259
October 5	Baltimore	United States	CFG Bank Arena	Amaarae	12,251 / 12,251	$1,550,458
October 8	Philadelphia	United States	Wells Fargo Center	Amaarae	13,763 / 13,763	$1,913,428
October 11	Montreal	Canada	Bell Centre	Amaarae	14,954 / 14,954	$1,036,151
October 13	Chicago	United States	United Center	Amaarae	14,223 / 14,223	$1,929,441
October 14	Minneapolis	United States	Target Center	Amaarae	12,365 / 12,365	$1,452,678
October 16	Nashville	United States	Bridgestone Arena	Griff	13,713 / 13,713	$1,730,223
October 17	St. Louis	United States	Chaifetz Arena	Griff	11,727 / 11,727	$1,326,879
October 19	Raleigh	United States	Lenovo Center	Griff	13,366 / 13,366	$1,745,993
October 20	Charlottesville	United States	John Paul Jones Arena	Griff	12,482 / 12,482	$1,471,291
October 22	Atlanta	United States	State Farm Arena	Griff	13,434 / 13,434	$1,756,731
October 24	Orlando	United States	Kia Center	Griff	12,962 / 12,962	$1,780,555
October 25	Tampa	United States	Amalie Arena	Griff	13,193 / 13,193	$1,853,227
October 27	Houston	United States	Toyota Center	Griff	13,193 / 13,193	$1,853,227
October 28	Austin	United States	Moody Center	Griff	12,203 / 12,203	$1,346,091
October 30	Dallas	United States	American Airlines Center	Griff	13,276 / 13,276	$1,897,468
November 1	Denver	United States	Ball Arena	Declan McKenna	149,000	$19,200,000
November 2	Salt Lake City	United States	Delta Center	Declan McKenna	149,000	$19,200,000
November 4	Vancouver	Canada	Pacific Coliseum	Declan McKenna	149,000	$19,200,000
November 6	Seattle	United States	Climate Pledge Arena	Declan McKenna	149,000	$19,200,000
November 7	Portland	United States	Moda Center	Declan McKenna	149,000	$19,200,000
November 9	San Francisco	United States	Chase Center	Declan McKenna	149,000	$19,200,000
November 10	San Diego	United States	Pechanga Arena	Declan McKenna	149,000	$19,200,000
November 13	Phoenix	United States	Footprint Center	Declan McKenna	149,000	$19,200,000
November 15	Los Angeles	United States	Crypto.com Arena	Declan McKenna	149,000	$19,200,000
November 17	Inglewood	United States	Kia Forum	Declan McKenna	149,000	$19,200,000
November 18	Inglewood	United States	Kia Forum	Declan McKenna	149,000	$19,200,000

List of 2025 concerts
Date (2025)	City	Country	Venue	Supporting acts	Attendance	Revenue
March 3	Dublin	Ireland	3Arena	Rachel Chinouriri	307,000 (Note: For all 20 shows in Europe. The two shows in London drew a crowd of 36,000.)	$30,400,000 (Note: For all 20 shows in Europe. The two shows in London got the revenue of $4,100,000.)
March 4	Dublin	Ireland	3Arena	Rachel Chinouriri	307,000	$30,400,000
March 6	Birmingham	England	Utilita Arena	Rachel Chinouriri	307,000	$30,400,000
March 8	London	England	The O_{2} Arena	Rachel Chinouriri	307,000	$30,400,000
March 9	London	England	The O_{2} Arena	Rachel Chinouriri	307,000	$30,400,000
March 11	Glasgow	Scotland	OVO Hydro	Rachel Chinouriri	307,000	$30,400,000
March 13	Manchester	England	Co-op Live	Rachel Chinouriri	307,000	$30,400,000
March 14	Manchester	England	Co-op Live	Rachel Chinouriri	307,000	$30,400,000
March 16	Paris	France	Accor Arena	Rachel Chinouriri	307,000	$30,400,000
March 17	Paris	France	Accor Arena	Rachel Chinouriri	307,000	$30,400,000
March 19	Berlin	Germany	Uber Arena	Rachel Chinouriri	307,000	$30,400,000
March 22	Brussels	Belgium	ING Arena	Rachel Chinouriri	307,000	$30,400,000
March 23	Amsterdam	Netherlands	Ziggo Dome	Rachel Chinouriri	307,000	$30,400,000
March 26	Assago	Italy	Unipol Forum	Rachel Chinouriri	307,000	$30,400,000
March 27	Zürich	Switzerland	Hallenstadion	Rachel Chinouriri	307,000	$30,400,000
March 30	Bærum (Note: Labeled as Oslo in press material.)	Norway	Unity Arena	Rachel Chinouriri	307,000	$30,400,000
March 31	Copenhagen	Denmark	Royal Arena	Rachel Chinouriri	307,000	$30,400,000
April 1	Copenhagen	Denmark	Royal Arena	Rachel Chinouriri	307,000	$30,400,000
April 3	Stockholm	Sweden	Avicii Arena	Rachel Chinouriri	307,000	$30,400,000
April 4	Stockholm	Sweden	Avicii Arena	Rachel Chinouriri	307,000	$30,400,000
October 23	Pittsburgh	United States	PPG Paints Arena	Olivia Dean; Amber Mark	27,100	$4,800,000
October 24	Pittsburgh	United States	PPG Paints Arena	Olivia Dean; Amber Mark	27,100	$4,800,000
October 26	New York City	United States	Madison Square Garden	Olivia Dean; Amber Mark	56,200	$9,800,000
October 28	New York City	United States	Madison Square Garden	Olivia Dean; Amber Mark	56,200	$9,800,000
October 29	New York City	United States	Madison Square Garden	Olivia Dean; Amber Mark	56,200	$9,800,000
October 31	New York City	United States	Madison Square Garden	Olivia Dean; Amber Mark	56,200	$9,800,000
November 1	New York City	United States	Madison Square Garden	Olivia Dean; Amber Mark	69,800	$11,300,000
November 4	Nashville	United States	Bridgestone Arena	Olivia Dean; Amber Mark	69,800	$11,300,000
November 5	Nashville	United States	Bridgestone Arena	Olivia Dean; Amber Mark	69,800	$11,300,000
November 10	Toronto	Canada	Scotiabank Arena	Ravyn Lenae; Amber Mark	69,800	$11,300,000
November 11	Toronto	Canada	Scotiabank Arena	Ravyn Lenae; Amber Mark	69,800	$11,300,000
November 16	Los Angeles	United States	Crypto.com Arena	Ravyn Lenae; Amber Mark	77,200	$13,500,000
November 17	Los Angeles	United States	Crypto.com Arena	Ravyn Lenae; Amber Mark	77,200	$13,500,000
November 19	Los Angeles	United States	Crypto.com Arena	Ravyn Lenae; Amber Mark	77,200	$13,500,000
November 20	Los Angeles	United States	Crypto.com Arena	Ravyn Lenae; Amber Mark	77,200	$13,500,000
November 22	Los Angeles	United States	Crypto.com Arena	Ravyn Lenae; Amber Mark	77,200	$13,500,000
November 23	Los Angeles	United States	Crypto.com Arena	Ravyn Lenae; Amber Mark	77,200	$13,500,000
Total					975,500	$125,600,000
