= Short n' Sweet =

- Standard cover

Studio album by Sabrina Carpenter
- Released: August 23, 2024
- Recorded: 2022–2024
- Studios: Electric Lady, Big Mercy Sound (New York City); Flow (Chailland, France); Juicy Hill (Bahamas); Pleasure Hill (Portland); Santa Ynez house (Santa Ynez); Sharp Sonics (Los Angeles); The Nest (Nashville, Tennessee); The Playpen, The Perch (Calabasas)
- Genres: Pop; dance-pop
- Length: 36:15
- Label: Island
- Producers: Jack Antonoff; Julian Bunetta; Ian Kirkpatrick; John Ryan

Sabrina Carpenter chronology
Fruitcake (2023)	Short n' Sweet (2024)	Man's Best Friend (2025)

Singles from Short n' Sweet
- 1. "Espresso" Released: April 11, 2024; 2. "Please Please Please" Released: June 6, 2024; 3. "Taste" Released: August 23, 2024; 4. "Bed Chem" Released: October 8, 2024

Singles from Short n' Sweet (Deluxe)
- 1. "Busy Woman" Released: March 7, 2025

Short n' Sweet is the sixth studio album by American singer Sabrina Carpenter. It was released on August 23, 2024, by Island Records. Primarily a pop and dance-pop record, Short n' Sweet was produced by Julian Bunetta, John Ryan, Ian Kirkpatrick, and Jack Antonoff. The album explores Carpenter's love life and her perspectives on 2020s dating. Its title is a reference to the emotional impact of her shortest romantic relationships, as well as her short stature and the album's brief runtime. She stated that Short n' Sweet is her second "big girl" album where she has had complete creative control of her music starting from Emails I Can't Send (2022), her first album with Island Records.

Two singles, "Espresso" and "Please Please Please", preceded the album's release; both topped the Billboard Global 200 chart and exposed Carpenter to wider commercial success. The two also marked her first number-ones on the UK Singles Chart and the latter her first on the US Billboard Hot 100. The third single, "Taste", peaked at number one in the UK and number two in the US, while the fourth single, "Bed Chem", peaked at number six in the UK. Short n' Sweet topped the record charts in 18 countries and received multi-platinum certifications in 10 nations. To support the album, Carpenter embarked on the Short n' Sweet Tour, the first arena tour of her career, in September 2024.

Upon release, Short n' Sweet sold 15 million units worldwide and received critical acclaim, with praise for the confidence of the lyrics and the music's enjoyability, although some reviews criticized the songwriting as serviceable and low-risk. Short n' Sweet and its tracks received six nominations at the 67th Annual Grammy Awards, including Album of the Year, and won for Best Pop Vocal Album and Best Pop Solo Performance for "Espresso". Carpenter became one of the only fifteen artists in history to receive nominations in all four main General Field categories in a single night. She also released a deluxe edition of the album including a duet version of "Please Please Please" with Dolly Parton and "Busy Woman".

== Background ==
After signing with Island Records and releasing her fifth studio album Emails I Can't Send (2022), Sabrina Carpenter embarked on the Emails I Can't Send Tour, which began on September 29, 2022. From August 24, 2023, to March 9, 2024, Carpenter also served as an opening act for Taylor Swift on selected South American, Australian, and Asian dates of the Eras Tour.

In February 2024, speaking with Maya Hawke for Interview, Carpenter expressed her excitement about her new music and exploring more genres than her last album did. The next month, she confirmed in an interview with Cosmopolitan that she was working on her next album and noted "I'm starting to feel like I've outgrown the songs I'm singing [on The Eras Tour], which is always an exciting feeling because I think that means the next chapter is right around the corner". While being interviewed by Variety that August, Carpenter described the album as "the hot older sister" of Emails I Can't Send, and said that she "would consider" it as her second "big girl" album, in which she had "full creative control".

== Release and promotion ==
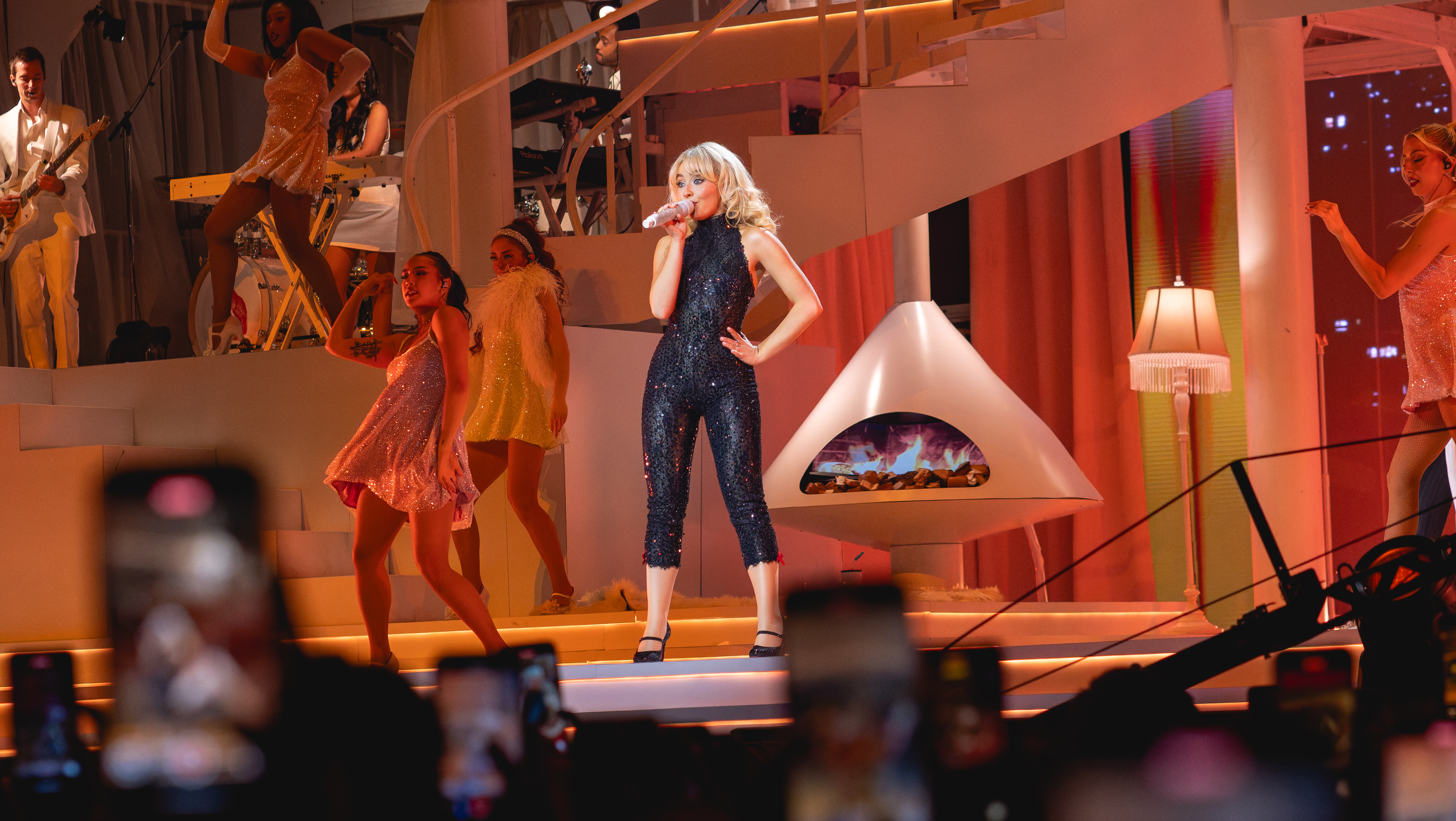
Carpenter performing at the Short n' Sweet Tour in 2025

Prior to any official announcement, billboards with tweets about Carpenter's height were placed throughout New York City. On social media, she posted a video where she can be seen walking to the camera and planting a kiss on the screen, teasing a future announcement. On June 3, 2024, Carpenter confirmed the release of Short n' Sweet and revealed its cover artwork. Featuring Carpenter looking over her bare shoulder marked by a lipstick kiss, the cover was described as similar to a photo of French model Tiffany Collier from February 2018. The tracklist was revealed on July 9, 2024. The album was released on August 23, 2024. Some limited vinyl and digital download editions of Short n' Sweet contained an exclusive bonus track, "Needless to Say". Another limited digital download edition of the album, titled Short n' Sweet(er) and released on August 29, 2024, contained a different exclusive bonus track, "Busy Woman", which Carpenter had written shortly after the album was finished, and decided to release as a "thank you" to her fans.

On February 4, 2025, Carpenter announced a deluxe edition of Short n' Sweet and shared its track listing. She dubbed it a "thank you" for the first two Grammy Awards of her career, which she had won at the 67th ceremony two days prior. It features five new tracks, including "Busy Woman" and a remix of "Please Please Please" featuring Dolly Parton. The deluxe edition was released on February 14.

=== Singles and music videos ===
In early April, Carpenter began to tease a single via billboards, and revealed that she would be releasing "a little song" before her performance at Coachella. On April 11, 2024, Carpenter released the single "Espresso", which became the lead single for the album. The song found commercial success, peaking at number three on the US Billboard Hot 100 and number one in various countries. Carpenter has performed the song at several events including Coachella and Saturday Night Live. A music video directed by Dave Meyers was also released.

"Please Please Please" was released as the second single from the album on June 6, 2024, along with a music video that the singer teased via social media. Directed by Bardia Zeinali, the video served as a sequel to "Espresso" and featured Barry Keoghan. The song peaked at the top of the Hot 100, earning Carpenter her first number-one single on the chart.

A third single, "Taste", was released alongside the album on August 23, 2024. Directed by Dave Meyers, the music video features American actress Jenna Ortega. The song debuted at number two on the Hot 100, joined by "Please Please Please" at number three and "Espresso" at number four, which in turn made Carpenter the first act since The Beatles to chart their first three top five hits in the region during the same week. On October 8, 2024, "Bed Chem" was sent to contemporary hit radio as the album's fourth single.

On February 14, 2025, to coincide with the release of the deluxe edition of Short n' Sweet, a music video for the duet version of "Please Please Please" with Dolly Parton was released, co-directed by Carpenter alongside Sean Price Williams. "Busy Woman" was released to Italian radio on March 7, 2025.

=== Tour ===
On June 20, 2024, Carpenter announced the Short n' Sweet Tour and its 33 concert dates throughout North America. The North American leg began on September 23, 2024, in Columbus, Ohio, and ended on November 18 in Inglewood, California. The tour visited Western European countries in early 2025, with 20 concerts planned. It then returned to North America in late 2025 for an additional 17 concerts.

== Composition ==
Nearly all songs of Short n' Sweet are about romance, albeit exploring different facets and emotions of Carpenter's love life. Romantic nihilism and deadpan lyrics are recurring motifs, exploring 2020s dating. The album title is a reference to how Carpenter's shortest romantic relationships had impacted her the most emotionally. Critics also interpreted it as a reference to Carpenter's stature and the short length of the album.

Musically, "Short n' Sweet" is a pop and dance-pop record with elements of country, folk, R&B, and rock dominating the soundscape. Much of the album features compositions of acoustic guitars. Subtle elements of funk and disco are also present in the album. Critics have observed creative influences of Taylor Swift, Dolly Parton, Kacey Musgraves, and Ariana Grande on the album's composition.

== Critical reception ==
Professional ratings
Aggregate scores
Source	Rating
AnyDecentMusic?	7.1/10
Metacritic	82/100
Review scores
Source	Rating
AllMusic	4.5/5 stars
Clash	7/10
The Daily Telegraph	4/5 stars
The Independent	4/5 stars
The Irish Times	3.5/5 stars
The Line of Best Fit	6/10
NME	4/5 stars
Pitchfork	8.0/10
Rolling Stone	4/5 stars
Slant Magazine	4/5 stars

According to the review aggregator Metacritic, Short n' Sweet received "universal acclaim" based on a weighted average score of 82 out of 100 from 17 critic scores. The review aggregator site AnyDecentMusic? compiled 15 reviews and gave Short n' Sweet an average of 7.1 out of 10, based on their assessment of the critical consensus.

Several critics described Short n' Sweet as a strong and assertive release from a rising pop star. The Independent's Helen Brown, Variety's Jem Aswad, Slate's Carl Wilson, and Billboard's Jason Lipshutz considered the album an artistic evolution for Carpenter after her breakthrough with Emails I Can't Send, and praised its versatile yet cohesive sound, confident lyricism, and mainstream appeal. The Times' Victoria Segal and The Daily Telegraph's Neil McCormick regarded Short n' Sweet as a "smart" pop record that masquerades itself as a frothy mainstream release; McCormick elaborated, "Carpenter can come across as a slightly glib pop comedian for disillusioned Tinder addicts" in the album, even though "there are emotional counterweights in the clever songcraft".

A few critics felt the album was an artistically safe work engineered for listeners' tastes, while others lauded it as an authentic portrayal of Carpenter's wit. Lauren Murphy of The Irish Times and El Hunt of Evening Standard opined, in contrast to the risky and "challenging" music from Carpenter's peers in 2024, Short n' Sweet is a breezy, enjoyable and "serviceable" collection of songs. Tanatat Khuttapan of The Line of Best Fit felt the album is "on trend", catering to the audiences' affinity for subject relatability, "memeable catchphrases" and punchlines. On the other hand, McCormick, Slant Magazine's Charles Lyon-Burt, and Rolling Stone's Rob Sheffield named Carpenter's humor the album's most remarkable trait. Pitchfork's critic Quinn Moreland labelled Short n' Sweet as refreshing escapism "in a pop landscape recently plagued by self-seriousness and a tiresome obsession with authenticity", admiring the album's "diamond-sharp" humor.

The album's sexual lyrics divided critics. On the positive side, Wilson opined that Carpenter reinvents herself as a "poet laureate of sex" in the album. Kiana Doyle of Associated Press described it as "flirty, fun and wholly unserious". Besides Doyle, Aswad also described Short n' Sweet as a perfected "NSFW" album. Chris Kelly of The Washington Post declared Short n' Sweet the "raunchiest, wittiest pop album of the year". In unfavorable reviews, Emily Bootle of i dubbed Short n' Sweet a "horny" album lacking in emotion, integrity, and "organic essence". Sputnikmusic criticized the album as a disappointing, "incredibly mediocre" release from Carpenter, finding the racy lyrics "weird and uncomfortable".

Some reviews, such as those from Segal and Hunt, considered "Espresso" the highlight of the album, finding other songs musically dull in comparison. Brown disagreed, claiming the album is anchored by its "TikTok pop" sound exemplified by many "cool" tracks other than "Espresso". On the other hand, Clash's Ims Taylor described Short n' Sweet as a soft and "sincere" album instead of the "sultry" archetypal popstar project its singles had hinted at, but agreed that the album is holistically "less addictive" than "Espresso". Stereogum's Tom Breihan agreed that much of the album, though polished, is not as breezy as "Espresso". Sputnikmusic declared that the album did not live up to the expectations set by "Espresso" and "Please Please Please".

=== Year-end lists ===
Select year-end rankings for Short n' Sweet
Critic/Publication	List	Rank	Ref.
Billboard	The Best 50 Albums of 2024	3	
Entertainment Weekly	The 10 Best Albums of 2024	3	
The Independent	The Best Albums of 2024	16	
Los Angeles Times	The 20 Best Albums of 2024	1	
Jon Caramanica (The New York Times)	Best Albums of 2024	2	
The New Yorker	The Best Albums of 2024	3	
NME	The 50 Best Albums of 2024	42	
Pitchfork	The 50 Best Albums of 2024	35	
Rolling Stone	The 100 Best Albums of 2024	4	
Slant Magazine	The 50 Best Albums of 2024	29	

== Accolades ==
Awards and nominations
Organization	Year	Category	Result	Ref.
Grammy Awards	2025	Album of the Year	Nominated	
Grammy Awards	2025	Best Pop Vocal Album	Won	
Grammy Awards	2025	Best Engineered Album, Non-Classical	Nominated	
American Music Awards	2025	Album of the Year	Nominated	
American Music Awards	2025	Favorite Pop Album	Nominated	
Nickelodeon Kids' Choice Awards	2025	Favorite Album	Won	
MTV Video Music Awards	2025	Best Album	Won	

== Commercial performance ==
Short n' Sweet debuted at number one on the US Billboard 200 chart, marking Carpenter's first number one and top-10 album and best opening week at the time. It opened with 362,000 album equivalent units. The album spent a second week at the top spot with 159,000 album equivalent units. In its third week, the album remained at number one with 117,000 album equivalent units. This made it the second-longest running number one album of the year on the Billboard 200, only behind Taylor Swift's The Tortured Poets Department. As of December 2025, Short n' Sweet has been certified quadruple platinum by the Recording Industry Association of America (RIAA), marking this achievement as a first for any of her albums. The album debuted atop as well in Portugal, France, Spain, Belgium, Norway, Switzerland and Finland, becoming her first number one album in these territories.

== Track listing ==
Short n' Sweet track listing^{[a]}
No.	Title	Writer(s)	Producer(s)	Length
1.	"Taste"	Sabrina Carpenter; Amy Allen; Julia Michaels; John Ryan; Ian Kirkpatrick	Ryan; Kirkpatrick; Julian Bunetta	2:37
2.	"Please Please Please"	Carpenter; Allen; Jack Antonoff	Antonoff	3:06
3.	"Good Graces"	Carpenter; Allen; Michaels; Ryan; Bunetta	Ryan; Bunetta	3:05
4.	"Sharpest Tool"	Carpenter; Allen; Antonoff	Antonoff	3:38
5.	"Coincidence"	Carpenter; Allen; Michaels; Ryan; Kirkpatrick	Ryan; Kirkpatrick	2:44
6.	"Bed Chem"	Carpenter; Allen; Michaels; Ryan; Kirkpatrick	Ryan; Kirkpatrick	2:51
7.	"Espresso"	Carpenter; Allen; Steph Jones; Bunetta	Bunetta	2:55
8.	"Dumb & Poetic"	Carpenter; Allen; Michaels; Ryan	Ryan	2:13
9.	"Slim Pickins"	Carpenter; Allen; Antonoff	Antonoff	2:32
10.	"Juno"	Carpenter; Allen; Ryan	Ryan	3:43
11.	"Lie to Girls"	Carpenter; Allen; Antonoff	Antonoff	3:22
12.	"Don't Smile"	Carpenter; Allen; Jones; Ryan; Bunetta	Ryan; Bunetta	3:26
Total length:				36:15

LP special edition bonus track
No.	Title	Writer(s)	Producer(s)	Length
13.	"Needless to Say"	Carpenter; Allen; Ryan; Kirkpatrick	Ryan; Kirkpatrick; Antonoff	2:37
Total length:				38:52

Deluxe edition bonus tracks
No.	Title	Writer(s)	Producer(s)	Length
13.	"15 Minutes"	Carpenter; Allen; Ryan; Bunetta	Ryan; Bunetta	3:11
14.	"Please Please Please" (featuring Dolly Parton)	Carpenter; Allen; Antonoff	Antonoff	3:04
15.	"Couldn't Make It Any Harder"	Carpenter; Allen; Ryan; Bunetta	Ryan; Bunetta	2:59
16.	"Busy Woman"	Carpenter; Allen; Antonoff	Antonoff	3:06
17.	"Bad Reviews"	Carpenter; Allen; Ryan; Kirkpatrick	Ryan; Kirkpatrick; Antonoff	2:21
Total length:				50:57

Notes

- ^{^a}The digital limited editions of the album include either "Needless to Say", "Busy Woman" or "Taste" (demo) as a bonus track.

== Personnel ==
Credits adapted from album liner notes.

Musicians

- Sabrina Carpenter – vocals (1–17), percussion (16)
- John Ryan – bass, guitar, keyboards (1, 3, 5, 6, 8, 10, 12, 13, 15, 17); drums, percussion, programming (1, 3, 5, 6, 8, 10, 12, 13, 15); background vocals (5, 13, 15)
- Julian Bunetta – bass, drums, guitar, keyboards, percussion, programming (1, 3, 7, 12, 13, 15)
- Ian Kirkpatrick – bass, guitar, keyboards, percussion (5, 6); programming (5, 6, 17); background vocals (5); drums (6)
- Jack Antonoff – programming, acoustic guitar, drums (2, 4, 9, 11, 14, 16, 17); percussion (2, 4, 9, 16, 17); electric guitar (2, 4, 11, 14, 16); synthesizer (2, 4, 11, 14, 16, 17); bass (2, 11, 14, 16, 17); 12-string guitar, sitar, Wurlitzer (4); Farfisa (11); Mellotron (11, 14, 17); banjo (14); background vocals, glockenspiel, piano (17)
- Aaron Sterling – drums (1)
- Sean Hutchinson – percussion, drums (2, 9)
- Evan Smith – flute (2)
- Bobby Hawk – violin (2, 9, 16, 17)
- Rob Moose – strings (8, 13, 15)
- Francisco Ojeda – double bass (9, 17)
- Mikey Freedom Hart – slide guitar (9)
- Amy Allen – background vocals (5, 7)
- Julia Michaels – background vocals (5)
- Steph Jones – background vocals (7)
- Dolly Parton – vocals (14)
- Greg Leisz – electric guitar, pedal steel guitar (17)
- Whit Wright – steel guitar (17)

Technical

- Serban Ghenea – mixing (1, 2, 4, 6, 9, 11, 13–17)
- Manny Marroquin – mixing (3, 5, 10, 12)
- Nathan Dantzler – mastering (1, 3, 5–8, 10, 12, 13, 15)
- Ruairi O'Flaherty – mastering (2, 4, 9, 11, 14, 16, 17)
- Jeff Gunnell – recording (1, 3, 5–8, 10, 12, 13, 15, 17); engineering, mixing (7); mixing assistance (8)
- John Ryan – recording (1, 3, 5, 6, 8, 10, 13, 15, 17), mixing (8)
- Laura Sisk – recording (2, 4, 9, 11, 14, 16, 17)
- Oli Jacobs – recording (2, 4, 9, 11, 14, 16, 17)
- Julian Bunetta – recording (3, 12, 13); engineering, mixing (7)
- Ian Kirkpatrick – recording (5, 6, 17)
- Chris Latham – recording (14)
- Tom Rutledge – recording (14)
- Sean Hutchinson – engineering (2)
- Evan Smith – engineering (2)
- Mikey Freedom Hart – engineering (9)
- David Hart – engineering (9)
- Jack Manning – engineering assistance (2, 4, 11, 14, 17), recording (9, 16)
- Joey Miller – engineering assistance (2, 4, 9, 11, 14, 16, 17)
- Jozef Caldwell – engineering assistance (2, 4, 9, 11, 14, 16, 17)
- Bryce Bordone – mix engineering (1, 2, 6, 9, 11), mixing assistance (4, 13–17)
- Anthony Vilchis – mixing assistance (3, 5, 10, 12)
- Trey Station – mixing assistance (3, 5, 10, 12)
- Zach Pereyra – mixing assistance (3, 5, 10, 12)
- Harrison Tate – mastering assistance (1, 3, 5–8, 10, 12, 13, 15)

== Charts ==
=== Weekly charts ===
Weekly chart performance for Short n' Sweet
Chart (2024–2025)	Peak position
Argentine Albums (CAPIF)	1
Australian Albums (ARIA)	1
Austrian Albums (Ö3 Austria)	1
Belgian Albums (Ultratop Flanders)	1
Belgian Albums (Ultratop Wallonia)	1
Canadian Albums (Billboard)	1
Croatian International Albums (HDU)	2
Czech Albums (ČNS IFPI)	1
Danish Albums (Hitlisten)	1
Dutch Albums (Album Top 100)	1
Finnish Albums (Suomen virallinen lista)	1
French Albums (SNEP)	1
German Albums (Offizielle Top 100)	3
Greek Albums (IFPI)	2
Hungarian Albums (MAHASZ)	8
Icelandic Albums (Tónlistinn)	3
Icelandic Albums (Tónlistinn) Deluxe edition	9
Irish Albums (Official Charts)	1
Italian Albums (FIMI)	9
Japanese Albums (Oricon)	40
Japanese Combined Albums (Oricon)	34
Japanese Hot Albums (Billboard Japan)	33
Lithuanian Albums (AGATA)	5
New Zealand Albums (RMNZ)	1
Nigerian Albums (TurnTable)	54
Norwegian Albums (VG-lista)	1
Polish Albums (ZPAV)	2
Portuguese Albums (AFP)	1
Scottish Albums (Official Charts)	1
Slovak Albums (ČNS IFPI)	3
Spanish Albums (Promusicae)	1
Swedish Albums (Sverigetopplistan)	2
Swiss Albums (Schweizer Hitparade)	1
UK Albums (Official Charts)	1
US Billboard 200	1

=== Year-end charts ===
2024 year-end chart performance for Short n' Sweet
Chart (2024)	Position
Australian Albums (ARIA)	3
Austrian Albums (Ö3 Austria)	27
Belgian Albums (Ultratop Flanders)	10
Belgian Albums (Ultratop Wallonia)	89
Canadian Albums (Billboard)	36
Danish Albums (Hitlisten)	33
Dutch Albums (Album Top 100)	6
French Albums (SNEP)	52
German Albums (Offizielle Top 100)	52
Global Albums (IFPI)	3
Hungarian Albums (MAHASZ)	73
Icelandic Albums (Tónlistinn)	28
New Zealand Albums (RMNZ)	4
Polish Albums (ZPAV)	45
Portuguese Albums (AFP)	6
Spanish Albums (PROMUSICAE)	31
Swedish Albums (Sverigetopplistan)	19
Swiss Albums (Schweizer Hitparade)	41
UK Albums (OCC)	3
US Billboard 200	26

2025 year-end chart performance for Short n' Sweet
Chart (2025)	Position
Australian Albums (ARIA)	3
Austrian Albums (Ö3 Austria)	10
Belgian Albums (Ultratop Flanders)	10
Belgian Albums (Ultratop Wallonia)	32
Canadian Albums (Billboard)	2
Croatian International Albums (HDU)	23
Danish Albums (Hitlisten)	7
Dutch Albums (Album Top 100)	6
French Albums (SNEP)	39
German Albums (Offizielle Top 100)	12
Global Albums (IFPI)	5
Hungarian Albums (MAHASZ)	34
Icelandic Albums (Tónlistinn)	27
Japanese Hot Albums (Billboard Japan)	89
New Zealand Albums (RMNZ)	4
Polish Albums (ZPAV)	17
Spanish Albums (PROMUSICAE)	21
Swedish Albums (Sverigetopplistan)	9
Swiss Albums (Schweizer Hitparade)	19
UK Albums (OCC)	2
US Billboard 200	5

== Certifications and sales ==
Certifications and sales for Short n' Sweet
Region	Certification	Certified units/sales
Australia (ARIA)	2× Platinum	140,000^{‡}
Austria (IFPI Austria)	Gold	7,500^{‡}
Belgium (BRMA)	2× Platinum	40,000^{‡}
Brazil (Pro-Música Brasil)	3× Platinum	120,000^{‡}
Brazil (Pro-Música Brasil) Deluxe	Platinum	40,000^{‡}
Canada (Music Canada)	5× Platinum	400,000^{‡}
Denmark (IFPI Danmark)	2× Platinum	40,000^{‡}
France (SNEP)	Platinum	100,000^{‡}
Germany (BVMI)	Gold	75,000^{‡}
Iceland (FHF)	—	1,937
Italy (FIMI)	Gold	25,000^{‡}
Netherlands (NVPI)	Platinum	37,200^{‡}
New Zealand (RMNZ)	4× Platinum	60,000^{‡}
Poland (ZPAV)	2× Platinum	40,000^{‡}
Portugal (AFP)	3× Platinum	21,000^{‡}
Spain (Promusicae)	Platinum	40,000^{‡}
Sweden (GLF) Deluxe	2× Platinum	60,000^{‡}
United Kingdom (BPI)	3× Platinum	900,000^{‡}
United States (RIAA)	4× Platinum	4,000,000^{‡}
^{‡} Sales+streaming figures based on certification alone.

== Release history ==
Release history and formats for Short n' Sweet
Region	Date	Format(s)	Label	Ref.
Various	August 23, 2024	Cassette; CD; digital download; streaming; vinyl LP	Island	
United States	August 23, 2024	CD (Target exclusive); vinyl LP (Target exclusive)	Island	
Japan	December 6, 2024	CD	Universal Japan	
