= Taste (Sabrina Carpenter song) =

2024 single by Sabrina Carpenter

Single by Sabrina Carpenter

from the album Short n' Sweet
- Released: August 23, 2024
- Studio: The Perch (Calabasas, California); Juicy Hill (The Bahamas); The Playpen (Calabasas, California)
- Genre: Glam-pop; country pop; indie rock; pop rock; slacker rock
- Length: 2:37
- Label: Island
- Songwriters: Sabrina Carpenter; Julia Michaels; Amy Allen; John Ryan; Ian Kirkpatrick
- Producers: John Ryan; Julian Bunetta; Ian Kirkpatrick

Sabrina Carpenter singles chronology
"Please Please Please" (2024)	"Taste" (2024)	"Bed Chem" (2024)

Music video
- "Taste" on YouTube

"Taste" is a song by American singer Sabrina Carpenter from her sixth studio album, Short n' Sweet (2024). It was released through Island Records on August 23, 2024, as the third single from the album. Carpenter wrote it with songwriters Julia Michaels and Amy Allen and its producers John Ryan and Ian Kirkpatrick, with Julian Bunetta also contributing to production. "Taste" incorporates pop and rock subgenres.

Commercially, the song reached number one in Australia, Ireland, and the United Kingdom as well as the top five in Belgium, Canada, Iceland, Lebanon, Malaysia, the Netherlands, New Zealand, Norway, Singapore, and the United States. It also peaked at number two on the Billboard Global 200 chart. "Taste" has accumulated over one billion streams on Spotify.

== Background ==
In January 2021, Sabrina Carpenter signed a recording contract with Island Records. She announced that she was working on her sixth studio album in March 2024, exploring new genres and expecting that it would herald a new chapter in her life. In anticipation of her performance at Coachella, Carpenter announced that a single called "Espresso" would be released on April 11, 2024. The song was a surprise success, becoming her first number one single on the Billboard Global 200 chart and her first song to enter the top five on the Billboard Hot 100. She followed this with "Please Please Please" on June 6, 2024, which reached number one on the Billboard Hot 100.

Preceding an official announcement, billboards bearing tweets about Carpenter's height began appearing throughout New York City. On June 3, 2024, she announced that the album, titled Short n' Sweet, would be released by Island Records on August 23, 2024, and revealed its cover artwork. The tracklist was revealed on July 9, 2024.

Carpenter wrote the song "Taste" with songwriters Julia Michaels and Amy Allen and its producers John Ryan and Ian Kirkpatrick, with Julian Bunetta also contributing to production. The song served as a single alongside the album's release. According to Paper's Erica Campbell, it features Carpenter candidly addressing the complexities of relationship issues with the lyrics: "I've been known to share. You'll just have to taste me when he's kissing you". When asked about the song's bold topic in the interview, Carpenter said, "I will write any song. It doesn't mean I'll put it out, but I'll write it. I think the series of unfortunate events I've encountered in relationships are no secret to people who know me or think they know me."

== Composition ==
"Taste"
A sample of "Taste", with timed text, a song combining various pop and rock subgenres and infusing disco melodies with country-tinged vocals.

"Taste" is two minutes and 37 seconds long. Ryan and Bunetta programmed the song, and they produced it with Kirkpatrick. Ryan and Bunetta play guitar, bass, drums, and percussion, and Aaron Sterling plays drums. Ryan and Jeff Gunnell recorded the song at the Perch in Calabasas, California, Juicy Hill Studios in the Bahamas, and the Playpen in Calabasas, California; Serban Ghenea mixed it at MixStar Studios in Virginia Beach with engineering from Bryce Bordone; and Nathan Dantzler mastered it with assistance from Harrison Tate. "Taste" has been labeled as a pop, glam-pop, country pop, pop rock, rock, indie rock, and slacker rock song. According to Billboard's Jason Lipshutz, it "fuses rock guitar, country-tinged vocals and disco melodies". Lindsay Zoladz of The New York Times described the song as a mixture of "'80s pop gloss and '90s country sass".

This song is composed in the key of E♭ major, with a tempo of approximately 113 beats per minute (BPM).

== Critical reception ==
Lipshutz believed that being a "deliriously likable potpourri of pop styles", "Taste" deserved to be chosen as the album's third single. He went on to describe the song as an "electrifying anthem" whose breakdown was perfectly designed for Carpenter to perform on an arena tour. Including it in The New York Times's list of the most notable tracks of its release week, Zoladz shared a similar opinion and believed it continued the "winning streak" established by its preceding singles. Tom Breihan of Stereogum felt that "Taste" was "about to be another hit". Jem Aswaf of Variety said that the song "could be an alt-rock anthem if the guitars were louder".

== Commercial performance ==
"Taste" debuted at number two on the US Billboard Hot 100 issued for September 7, 2024. The song was joined by "Please Please Please" at number three and "Espresso" at number four, making Carpenter the only act other than the Beatles to chart their first three top five hits in the region during the same week. The song charted at number two on the Billboard Global 200. In Canada, "Taste" entered at number four on the Canadian Hot 100 issued for the same date.

In the United Kingdom, "Taste" debuted as Carpenter's third number one on the UK Singles Chart, with "Please Please Please" and "Espresso" appearing at numbers two and three respectively, during the same chart week. This made her the first female and third overall artist to earn Britain's number one album and single simultaneously while also occupying the single chart's top three. All three songs held their positions the following week, making Carpenter the only act other than Ed Sheeran to occupy the top three for two consecutive weeks.

In Australia, "Taste" entered at number one, followed by "Please Please Please" and "Espresso" as Carpenter occupied the entire top three. In New Zealand, "Taste" debuted at number two on the New Zealand Singles Chart. It also reached the top fifteen on national record charts at number one in Ireland, number two in Norway, number three in The Netherlands, number four in Singapore, number five in Malaysia, number eight in South Africa, number nine in Sweden, number eleven in Denmark, and number twelve in Latvia. However, it was less successful in some European nations, otherwise to "Espresso" and "Please, Please, Please", including France, where the song debuted and peaked at number 58, becoming her third entry but also her lowest debut in the country until "Manchild", who would drop the next year. The song stayed 26 weeks and certified gold. Alongside with France, "Taste" entered lowly in Moldavia, Romania and Italy, failing to enter in the top 50 equally.

== Music video ==
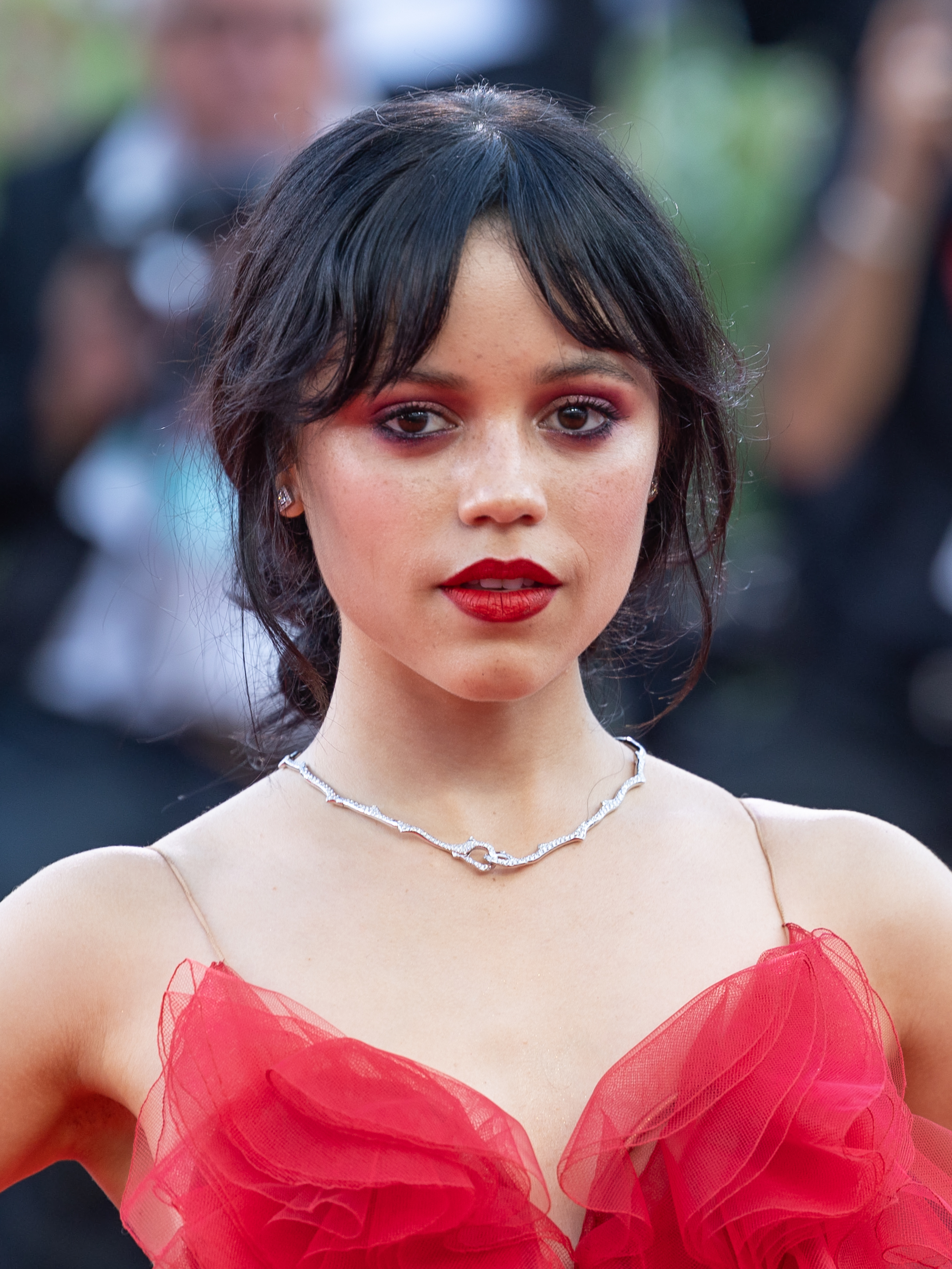
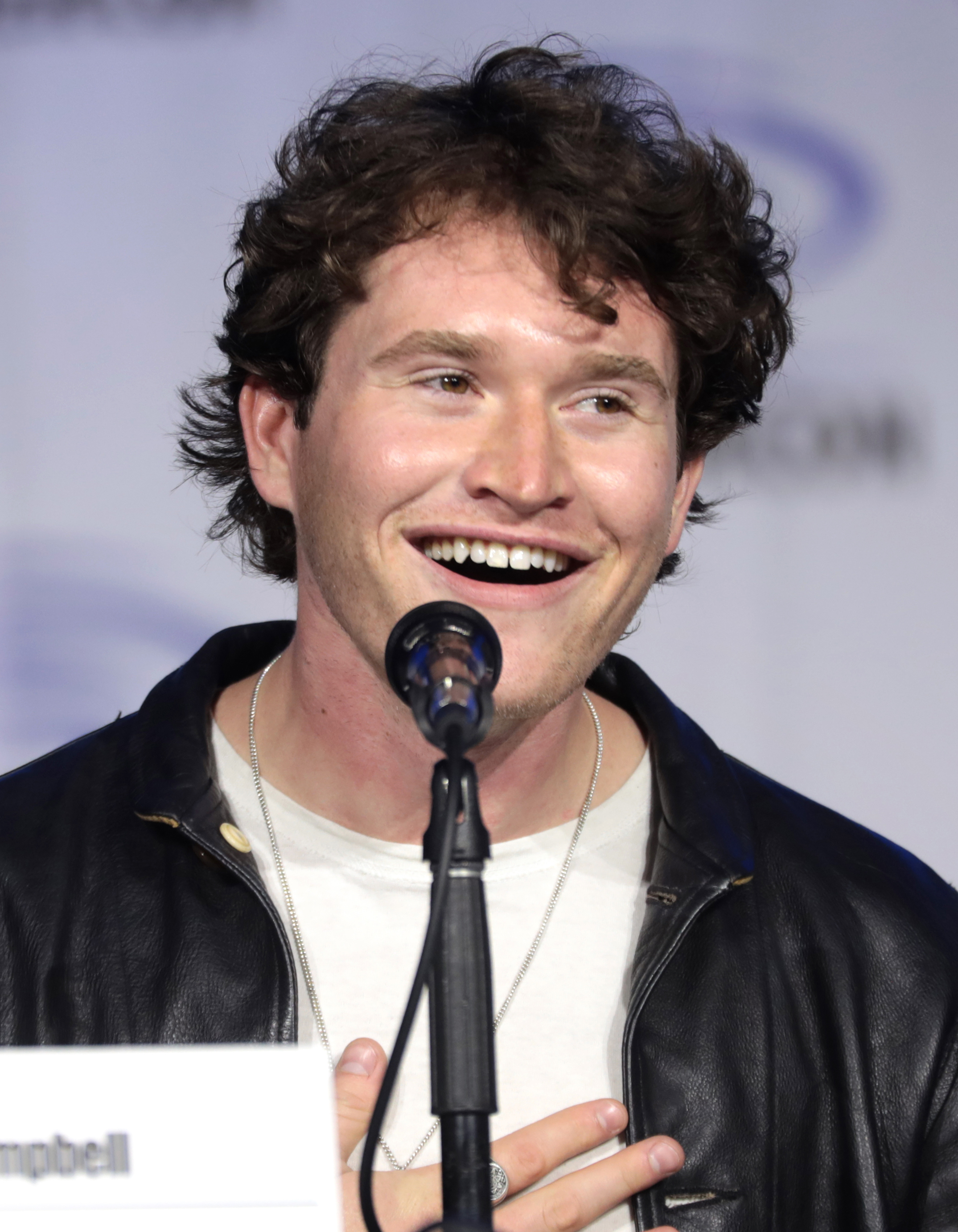
The music video features appearances from American actress Jenna Ortega (left) and Canadian actor Rohan Campbell (right).

Dave Meyers directed the music video, which features Jenna Ortega and Rohan Campbell. In a teaser that Carpenter posted online, she picks up a knife from a bed filled with weapons and walks into a house. She heads upstairs, where she finds Ortega in the shower with Campbell. Carpenter pulls back the shower curtain and goes to stab Ortega, who is visibly terrified. The screen cuts to black and Carpenter uses the knife as a mirror to fix her lipstick while singing, "Oh, I leave quite an impression."

The music video was inspired by Robert Zemeckis's 1992 film Death Becomes Her, starring Meryl Streep and Goldie Hawn, which carries a similar premise. The murder sequences and costume choices also make explicit visual references to Psycho (1960), The Hand That Rocks the Cradle (1992), Addams Family Values (1993), Ginger Snaps (2000), Kill Bill: Volume 1 (2003) and Scream 4 (2011).

=== Synopsis ===
The music video displayed various instances of graphic violence, seen here as Carpenter is impaled by the fence after falling off the balcony after getting shot by Ortega. Several critics compared the scene to the 2000 horror film Ginger Snaps.

The video starts with Carpenter singing a lullaby, preparing to kill her currently asleep target. She then breaks into the house of her ex-boyfriend (Campbell), planning to attack his new girlfriend (Ortega) with a machete. Ortega sets up a decoy in a bed and ambushes Carpenter, shooting her out of a window, where she is impaled on a fence. Carpenter then throws a knife at Ortega, which stabs her in the eye. This kicks off a gory battle between the two, featuring hospital defibrillators as weapons, voodoo dolls, and Ortega severing Carpenter's arm after the latter catches her in the shower with her boyfriend. Near the end of the video, while Ortega is kissing her boyfriend, the camera rotates around them and she finds herself hallucinating herself kissing Carpenter. Horrified, she promptly lashes out with her chainsaw, only to accidentally kill the boyfriend, failing to realize her mistake until Carpenter rushes out to watch him drown in the pool. At his funeral, the two women agree they are better off as friends than as rivals, and humorously discuss how insecure the victim was.

== Live performances ==
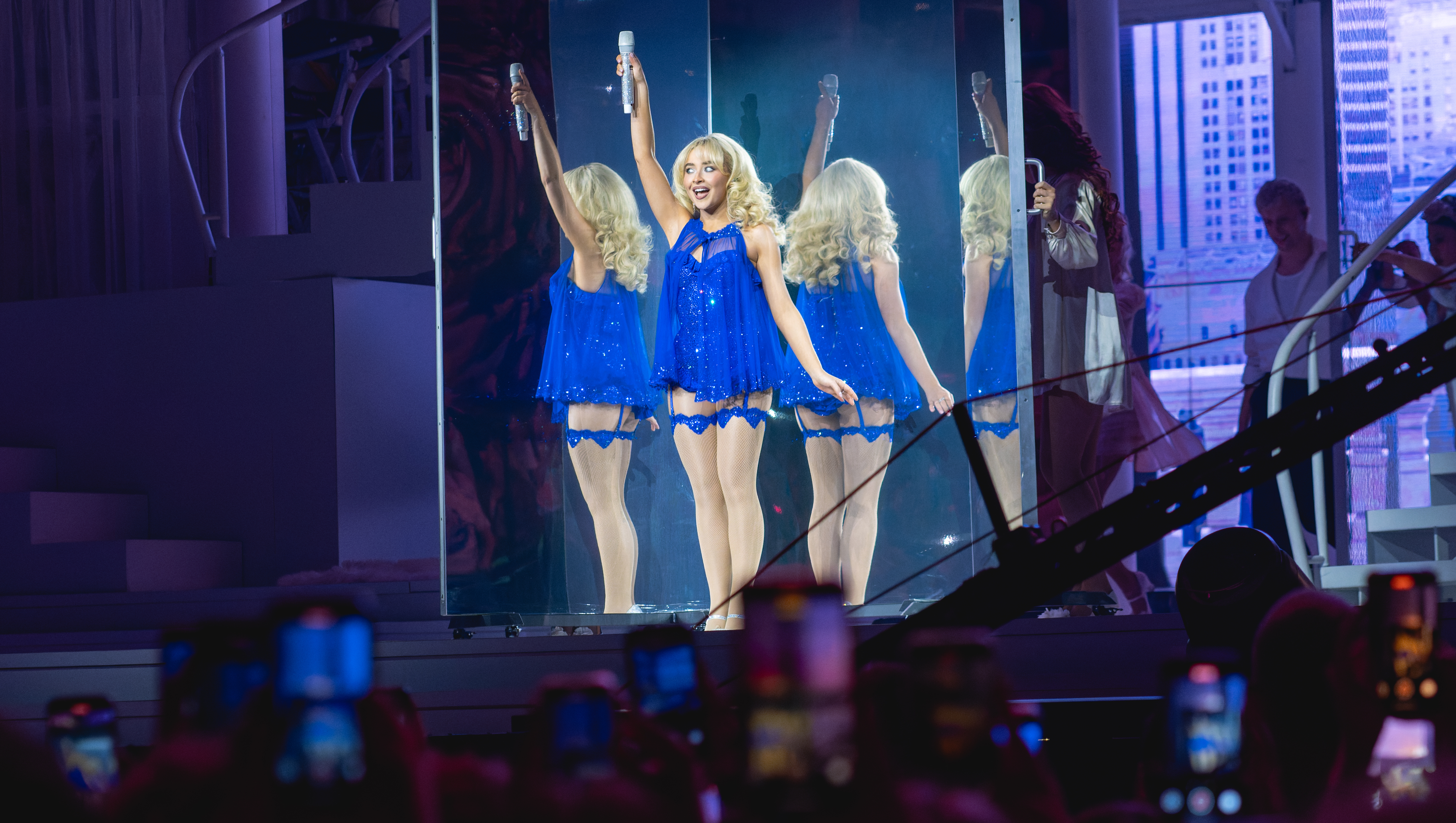
Carpenter performing "Taste" on the Short n' Sweet Tour in 2025

Carpenter performed a medley of "Taste", "Please Please Please", and "Espresso" at the 2024 MTV Video Music Awards on September 11, 2024. The performance began with an audio sample of Britney Spears's song "Oops!... I Did It Again" (2000). Perched on a massive diamond suspended high above the stage, Carpenter began performing "Please Please Please" as silver confetti cascaded around her. She touched down on a futuristic set where an astronaut and a blue-skinned alien performed a dance to "Taste". The provocative choreography included a moment where the alien playfully lifted a leg onto the astronaut's shoulder before Carpenter took centre-stage, pulling the astronaut aside and kissing the female alien. Stripping off the high collar of her silver-studded outfit, Carpenter strode down the catwalk while singing "Espresso", surrounded by helmeted dancers performing space-themed routines under neon signs and visuals of a giant Moon Person extending into the crowd. The performance concluded with Carpenter reclining into a group of dancers, inspired by Marilyn Monroe. Entertainment Weekly's Lester Fabian Brathwaite and Vogue's Hannah Jackson thought Carpenter channeled Spears, Monroe, and Madonna on the Blond Ambition World Tour. The song has also been included as the opening of Carpenter's sixth headlining tour, the Short n' Sweet Tour (2024–2025).

== Cover versions ==
On February 6, 2025, American singer Poppy performed a cover version of "Taste" live at Like a Version, with interpolation from Divinyls' song "I Touch Myself". British singer Beabadoobee covered the song and performed it at the BBC Radio 1 Live Lounge in October 2024.

== Credits and personnel ==
Credits are adapted from the liner notes of Short n' Sweet.

Recording and management

- Recorded at The Perch (Calabasas, California), Juicy Hill Studios (The Bahamas) and The Playpen (Calabasas, California)
- Mixed at MixStar Studios (Virginia Beach)

Personnel

- Sabrina Carpenter – vocals, songwriting
- Julia Michaels – songwriting
- Amy Allen – songwriting
- John Ryan – production, recording, songwriting, programming, guitar, bass, drums, percussion
- Ian Kirkpatrick – production, songwriting
- Julian Bunetta – production, programming, guitar, bass guitar, drums, percussion
- Aaron Sterling – drums
- Jeff Gunnell – recording
- Serban Ghenea – mixing
- Bryce Bordone – mix engineering
- Nathan Dantzler – mastering
- Harrison Tate – mastering assistance

== Charts ==
=== Weekly charts ===
Chart (2024–2025)	Peak position
Argentina Hot 100 (Billboard)	50
Australia (ARIA)	1
Austria (Ö3 Austria Top 40)	14
Belarus Airplay (TopHit)	40
Belgium (Ultratop 50 Flanders)	4
Belgium (Ultratop 50 Wallonia)	14
Brazil Hot 100 (Billboard)	31
Canada Hot 100 (Billboard)	4
Canada AC (Billboard)	8
Canada CHR/Top 40 (Billboard)	8
Canada Hot AC (Billboard)	34
Colombia Anglo Airplay (National-Report)	2
CIS Airplay (TopHit)	3
Croatia (Billboard)	20
Croatia International Airplay (Top lista)	8
Czech Republic Airplay (ČNS IFPI)	65
Czech Republic Singles Digital (ČNS IFPI)	15
Denmark (Tracklisten)	11
Estonia Airplay (TopHit)	2
Finland (Suomen virallinen lista)	21
France (SNEP)	58
Germany (GfK)	24
Global 200 (Billboard)	2
Greece International Streaming (IFPI)	7
Hong Kong (Billboard)	19
Hungary (Editors' Choice Top 40)	39
Hungary (Single Top 40)	34
Iceland (Tónlistinn)	5
India International Streaming (IMI)	20
Ireland (IRMA)	1
Israel (Mako Hitlist)	39
Italy (FIMI)	87
Japan Hot Overseas (Billboard Japan)	2
Kazakhstan Airplay (TopHit)	15
Latvia Airplay (LaIPA)	1
Latvia Streaming (LaIPA)	12
Lebanon (Lebanese Top 20)	2
Lithuania (AGATA)	22
Lithuania Airplay (TopHit)	2
Luxembourg (Billboard)	15
Malaysia (Billboard)	5
Middle East and North Africa (IFPI)	14
Moldova Airplay (TopHit)	101
Netherlands (Dutch Top 40)	3
Netherlands (Single Top 100)	6
New Zealand (Recorded Music NZ)	2
Nigeria (TurnTable Top 100)	50
North Macedonia Airplay (Radiomonitor)	8
Norway (VG-lista)	2
Philippines (Philippines Hot 100)	7
Poland (Polish Airplay Top 100)	14
Poland (Polish Streaming Top 100)	23
Portugal (AFP)	6
Romania Airplay (TopHit)	55
Russia Airplay (TopHit)	7
San Marino Airplay (SMRTV Top 50)	13
Singapore (RIAS)	4
Slovakia Airplay (ČNS IFPI)	19
Slovakia Singles Digital (ČNS IFPI)	14
Slovenia Airplay (Radiomonitor)	11
South Africa Streaming (TOSAC)	8
South Korea BGM (Circle)	195
South Korea Download (Circle)	133
Spain (Promusicae)	38
Sweden (Sverigetopplistan)	9
Switzerland (Schweizer Hitparade)	22
Ukraine Airplay (TopHit)	43
United Arab Emirates (IFPI)	7
UK Singles (Official Charts)	1
US Billboard Hot 100	2
US Adult Contemporary (Billboard)	13
US Adult Pop Airplay (Billboard)	7
US Dance Airplay (Billboard)	11
US Pop Airplay (Billboard)	1

=== Monthly charts ===
Chart (2024)	Peak position
Belarus Airplay (TopHit)	41
Brazil Streaming (Pro-Música Brasil)	45
CIS Airplay (TopHit)	4
Czech Republic (Singles Digitál Top 100)	30
Estonia Airplay (TopHit)	2
Kazakhstan Airplay (TopHit)	21
Lithuania Airplay (TopHit)	3
Paraguay Airplay (SGP)	9
Romania Airplay (TopHit)	66
Russia Airplay (TopHit)	8
Slovakia (Rádio Top 100)	20
Ukraine Airplay (TopHit)	60

=== Year-end charts ===
Chart (2024)	Position
Australia (ARIA)	28
Belgium (Ultratop 50 Flanders)	72
Canada (Canadian Hot 100)	66
CIS Airplay (TopHit)	57
Estonia Airplay (TopHit)	51
Global 200 (Billboard)	142
Lithuania Airplay (TopHit)	62
Netherlands (Dutch Top 40)	21
Netherlands (Single Top 100)	69
New Zealand (Recorded Music NZ)	42
Philippines (Philippines Hot 100)	69
Portugal (AFP)	129
Russia Airplay (TopHit)	85
UK Singles (OCC)	21
US Billboard Hot 100	86

Chart (2025)	Position
Argentina Anglo Airplay (Monitor Latino)	39
Australia (ARIA)	23
Belarus Airplay (TopHit)	124
Belgium (Ultratop 50 Flanders)	27
Belgium (Ultratop 50 Wallonia)	82
Canada (Canadian Hot 100)	17
Canada AC (Billboard)	29
Canada CHR/Top 40 (Billboard)	2
Canada Hot AC (Billboard)	21
Chile Airplay (Monitor Latino)	84
CIS Airplay (TopHit)	83
Denmark (Tracklisten)	98
Estonia Airplay (TopHit)	157
Global 200 (Billboard)	20
Lithuania Airplay (TopHit)	54
Netherlands (Dutch Top 40)	94
New Zealand (Recorded Music NZ)	32
Russia Airplay (TopHit)	115
UK Singles (OCC)	19
US Billboard Hot 100	19
US Adult Contemporary (Billboard)	29
US Adult Pop Airplay (Billboard)	15
US Pop Airplay (Billboard)	6

== Certifications ==
Certifications
Region	Certification	Certified units/sales
Australia (ARIA)	6× Platinum	420,000^{‡}
Austria (IFPI Austria)	Gold	15,000^{‡}
Belgium (BRMA)	Platinum	40,000^{‡}
Brazil (Pro-Música Brasil)	3× Diamond	480,000^{‡}
Canada (Music Canada)	5× Platinum	400,000^{‡}
Denmark (IFPI Danmark)	Platinum	90,000^{‡}
France (SNEP)	Platinum	200,000^{‡}
New Zealand (RMNZ)	3× Platinum	90,000^{‡}
Poland (ZPAV)	Platinum	50,000^{‡}
Portugal (AFP)	2× Platinum	20,000^{‡}
Spain (Promusicae)	Platinum	100,000^{‡}
Switzerland (IFPI Switzerland)	Gold	15,000^{‡}
United Kingdom (BPI)	3× Platinum	1,800,000^{‡}
United States (RIAA)	4× Platinum	4,000,000^{‡}
Streaming
Central America (CFC)	Platinum	7,000,000^{†}
Greece (IFPI Greece)	Platinum	2,000,000^{†}
Sweden (GLF)	Platinum	12,000,000^{†}
^{‡} Sales+streaming figures based on certification alone.^{†} Streaming-only figures based on certification alone.

== Release history ==
Region	Date	Format	Label	Ref.
United States	August 27, 2024	Contemporary hit radio	Island; Republic	
Italy	October 4, 2024	Radio airplay	Island	
France	January 10, 2025	7-inch vinyl	Island	
United Kingdom	January 10, 2025	7-inch vinyl	Island	
Germany	January 17, 2025	7-inch vinyl	Island	
United States	January 17, 2025	7-inch vinyl	Island	
