= Tastemaker =

Tastemaker may refer to:

- Tastemaker (EP)
- Tastemaker Award
- Tastemaker Music (a.k.a. The Tastemakers) a record production company
- Tastemakers Billboard charts
