= Juno (song) =

Song by Sabrina Carpenter

from the album Short n' Sweet
- Released: August 23, 2024
- Studio: Santa Ynez House, The Playpen (Calabasas, California)
- Genre: Pop; indie pop
- Length: 3:43
- Label: Island
- Songwriters: Sabrina Carpenter; Amy Allen; John Ryan
- Producer: John Ryan

Lyric video
- "Juno" on YouTube

"Juno" is a song by American singer Sabrina Carpenter from her sixth studio album, Short n' Sweet (2024). Carpenter wrote it with songwriter Amy Allen and album producer John Ryan. The song became available as the album's 10th track on August 23, 2024, when it was released by Island Records. A pop and indie pop track with influences from 1980s-style disco music, "Juno" depicts Carpenter's intense attraction towards a man to the point of wanting to be impregnated.

Music critics were generally positive about "Juno" and praised its production. Its sexually charged lyrics drew more mixed reviews, with reviewers identifying it as one of Carpenter's "horniest" songs and some finding it uncomfortable. The song reached the top 20 in Australia, Ireland, New Zealand, and Singapore and entered the charts in some other countries. Carpenter included it on the set list for her 2024–2025 concert tour, the Short n' Sweet Tour, where she teases different sexual positions while performing it at every show.

== Background ==
In January 2021, Sabrina Carpenter signed a recording contract with Island Records. She announced that she was working on her sixth studio album in March 2024, exploring new genres and expecting that it would herald a new chapter in her life. In anticipation of her performance at Coachella 2024, Carpenter announced that a single called "Espresso" would be released on April 11, 2024. The song was a surprise success, becoming her first number one single on the Billboard Global 200 chart and her first song to enter the top 10 on the Billboard Hot 100. "Espresso" was followed by "Please Please Please" (2024), which reached number one on the Billboard Hot 100.

Preceding an official announcement, billboards bearing tweets about Carpenter's height began appearing throughout New York City. On June 3, 2024, she announced that the album, titled Short n' Sweet, would be released by Island Records on August 23, 2024, and revealed its cover artwork. The tracklist was revealed on July 9, 2024. Carpenter wrote the song "Juno" with songwriter Amy Allen and its producer, John Ryan. The song became available for digital download and streaming on the album, which was released on August 23, 2024.

== Composition ==
"Juno" is 3 minutes and 43 seconds long. It was recorded at Santa Ynez House, the Playpen in Calabasas, California. Ryan produced and programmed the song, and he engineered it with Jeff Gunnell. Ryan plays drums, guitar, keyboards, percussion, and bass. Nathan Dantzler mastered it with assistance from Harrison Tate, and Manny Marroquin mixed it at Larrabee Sound Studios in Los Angeles with assistance from Zach Pereyra, Anthony Vilchis, and Trey Station.

Musically, "Juno" has been labeled as a pop and indie pop song by critics. It features influences of 1980s-style disco music. Billboard's Jason Lipshutz described the song as an "'80s-indebted workout", on which Carpenter employs double entendres like rhyming "high-fived" with "objectified", whose bridge builds towards a single declaration: "You make me wanna make you fall in love". Jake Viswanath of Bustle believed the track has "a Sheryl Crow-esque pop-rock groove straight from the early 2000s".

The lyrics of "Juno" reference the 2007 film. They depict Carpenter experiencing such an intense attraction to a man that she desires to get pregnant with his child. She expresses a desire to let him "lock me down", and compliments herself, stating that "One of me is cute, but two, though?". Based on her attraction to the man, she also compliments the genetics he was given by his father. Carpenter states that she wants to use pink handcuffs in a sexual encounter with the man. Later, she admits to showing his private pictures to her friends and apologizes in case he feels objectified by the act. She then directly declares: "I'm so fuckin' horny."

== Critical reception ==
Mainstream reviews for "Juno" were generally positive. Pitchfork's Quinn Moreland selected it as a standout on Short n' Sweet. Lipshutz ranked "Juno" first among the twelve album tracks; he believed the lyrics are memorable and seem tailor-made for TikTok trends and social media quotes, but it is Carpenter's skillful use of double entendres that truly captivates, showcasing Carpenter's pop expertise delivered with apparent ease. Rolling Stone authors believed it contained "a charming pop culture reference for the ages" and showcased that Carpenter's songwriting should not be underestimated. Rhian Daly of NME thought Carpenter discovered her niche and "nail[ed]" the song, which he described as a "frothy pop bop". Similarly, Clash's Ims Taylor called it one of the album's "bigger bops", on which she went "full coming-of-age", and Paste's Grace Robins-Somerville viewed it as "the most fun and light-hearted addition" to recent pop music about wishing for pregnancy.

Some critical commentary focused on the sexually charged nature of "Juno". Capital's Sam Prance thought it was "horny and romantic and it sounds like a pop classic in the making". Carl Wilson of Slate believed that it was the "horniest" track on the album. Likewise, People's Jack Irvin called it "arguably the album's most raunchy song". Writing for American Songwriter, Alex Hopper believed that "though she has many sexually charged tracks, few are as committed as this one" and that it was more straightforward than other ones where she uses innuendos. In a negative review, Sputnikmusic's Sowing thought the sexual lyrics did not feel "fun or flirty, or witty/ironic" and were an example of moments that rendered Short n' Sweet "a weird and uncomfortable listen". Isabel Glasgow of Exclaim! believed it was "campy fun" but also "a bit much".

== Commercial performance ==
"Juno" debuted at number 22 on the US Billboard Hot 100 issued for September 7, 2024. In Canada, the song entered at number 25 on the Canadian Hot 100 issued for the same date. In the United Kingdom, it debuted at number 28 on the Official Audio Streaming Chart. In Australia, "Juno" entered at number 19. The song debuted at number 19 in New Zealand. It charted at number 22 on the Billboard Global 200. "Juno" also reached national record charts at number 14 in Ireland, number 16 in Singapore, and number 54 in Portugal.

"Juno" reached number 2 on Recorded Music NZ's Radioscope100 airplay chart in February 2025.

== Live performances ==
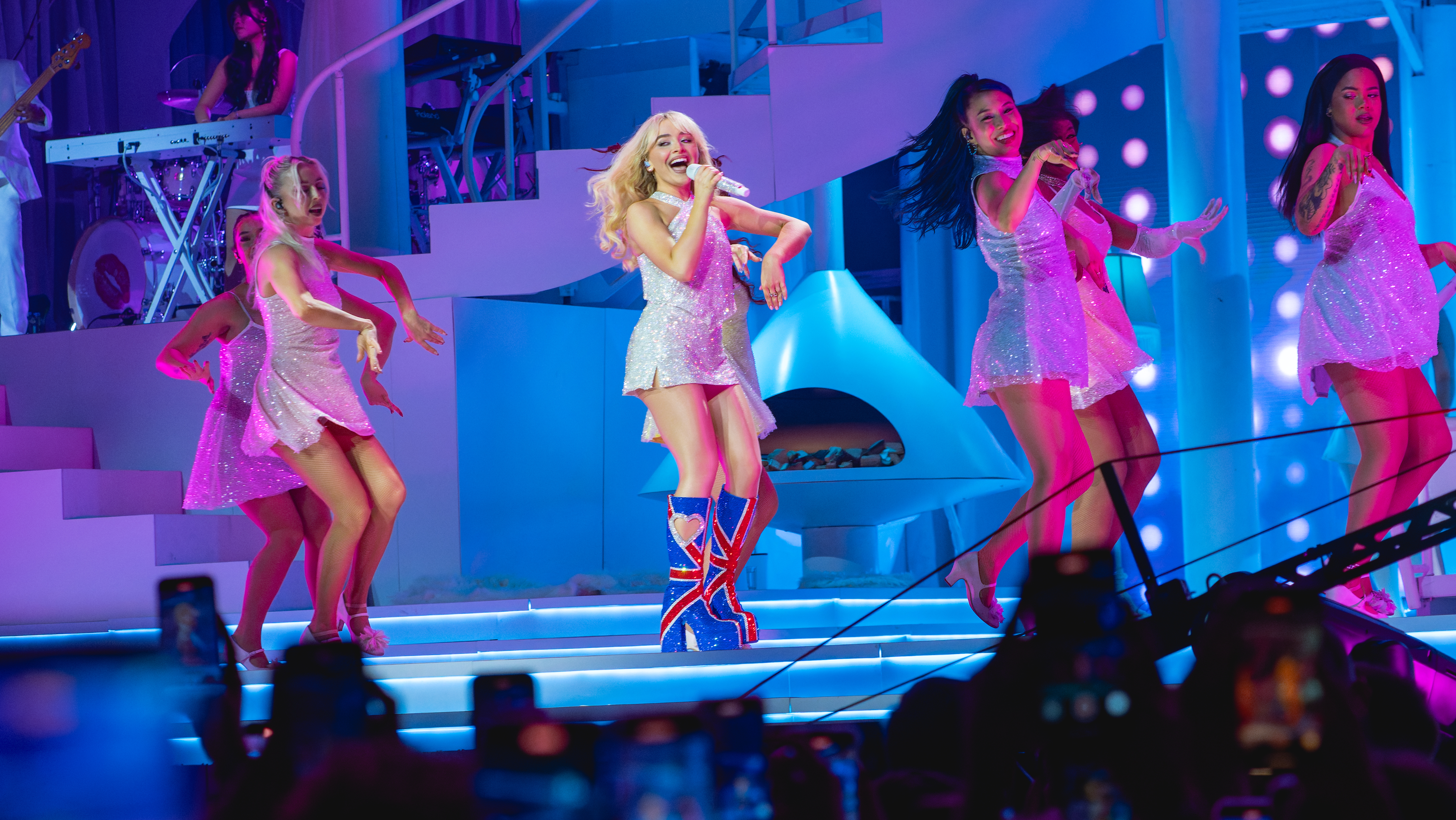
Carpenter performing "Juno" on the Short n' Sweet Tour in 2025

"Juno" appears on the set list for Carpenter's 2024–2025 concert tour, the Short n' Sweet Tour and her 2026 festival performances. Before performing the song, she passes pink handcuffs to an audience member, with an "under arrest for being too hot" alert being displayed on the screen. The people chosen have included Millie Bobby Brown, Rachel Sennott, Declan McKenna, Marcello Hernández, Margaret Qualley, Clairo, and Ayo Edebiri. In her 2026 headlining performances at Coachella, she had Will Ferrell and Terry Crews appear onstage prior to "Juno"'s performance, instead of having an "arrest". While singing its lyric about exploring different sexual positions, "have you ever tried this one?", Carpenter teases new sexual positions at every show, which included reverse cowgirl, splits, spooning, and motorboating among others. At one tour date, Carpenter changed the word "baby" to "Barry" in its lyrics as a reference to her then-partner Barry Keoghan: "I hear you knocking, Barry, come on up."

== Credits and personnel ==
Credits are adapted from the liner notes of Short n' Sweet.

- Sabrina Carpenter – vocals, songwriter
- John Ryan – producer, songwriter, drums, guitar, keyboards, percussion, programming, engineer, bass
- Amy Allen – songwriter
- Jeff Gunnell – engineer
- Nathan Dantzler – mastering
- Harrison Tate – mastering assistance
- Manny Marroquin – mixing
- Zach Pereyra – mixing assistance
- Anthony Vilchis – mixing assistance
- Trey Station – mixing assistance

== Charts ==
=== Weekly charts ===
| Chart (2024–2025) | Peak position |
|---|---|
| Australia (ARIA) | 19 |
| Canada Hot 100 (Billboard) | 25 |
| Global 200 (Billboard) | 22 |
| Ireland (IRMA) | 14 |
| Lithuania Airplay (TopHit) | 81 |
| Malta Airplay (Radiomonitor) | 14 |
| New Zealand (Recorded Music NZ) | 19 |
| Norway (VG-lista) | 42 |
| Philippines (Philippines Hot 100) | 26 |
| Portugal (AFP) | 54 |
| Singapore (RIAS) | 16 |
| Sweden (Sverigetopplistan) | 94 |
| UK Singles (Official Charts) | 24 |
| US Billboard Hot 100 | 22 |

=== Year-end charts ===
| Chart (2025) | Position |
|---|---|
| Global 200 (Billboard) | 189 |

== Certifications ==
Certifications
| Region | Certification | Certified units/sales |
|---|---|---|
| Australia (ARIA) | 2× Platinum | 140,000^{‡} |
| Brazil (Pro-Música Brasil) | Diamond | 160,000^{‡} |
| Canada (Music Canada) | 2× Platinum | 160,000^{‡} |
| New Zealand (RMNZ) | Platinum | 30,000^{‡} |
| United Kingdom (BPI) | Platinum | 600,000^{‡} |
| United States (RIAA) | Platinum | 1,000,000^{‡} |
Streaming
| Central America (CFC) | Gold | 3,500,000^{†} |
^{‡} Sales+streaming figures based on certification alone.^{†} Streaming-only figures based on certification alone.
