= TAST =

In linguistics, T_{AST} (always written as uppercase T plus uppercase AST in subscript) is an abbreviation for the time of assertion, a secondary temporal reference in establishing tense.

Grammatical tense represents the contrast between two measurements along the timeline of an utterance, with one of those measurements being the time of utterance T_{UTT} (the time at which the actual utterance is made). T_{UTT} is always the primary point of reference for tense. There are three additional references to which T_{UTT} can be contrasted: T_{AST} — the time of assertion, T_{COM} — the time of completion, and T_{EVL} — the time of evaluation; these are secondary references. The type used for the secondary reference is determined by aspect and type of utterance.

T_{AST} is the time at which the action of a verb takes place. It can be a single point in time (in the non-durational aspects) such as in English “I had dinner at 5pm.” Or, it can be a range of time (in the durational aspects) such as “I was eating dinner from 5 till 7.”
