= Tyler Perry's House of Payne season 4 =

Tyler Perry's House of Payne
- Season 4
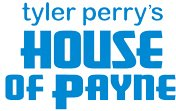
- No. of episodes: 46

Release
- Original network: TBS
- Original release: November 4, 2009 – January 19, 2011

Season chronology
- ← Previous; Season 3 Next → Season 5

The fourth season of Tyler Perry's House of Payne began airing on November 4, 2009. It stars LaVan Davis as Curtis Payne, Cassi Davis as Ella Payne, Allen Payne as CJ Payne, Lance Gross as Calvin Payne, Demetria McKinney as Janine Payne and Keshia Knight Pulliam as Miranda Payne. Larramie "Doc" Shaw, who plays as Malik Payne, appears infrequently this season due to scheduling conflicts with two other shows he starred in, The Suite Life on Deck and Pair of Kings. This season also features the return of China Anne McClain as Jazmine Payne and Denise Burse as Claretha Jenkins.

Season 4 consists of 46 episodes and concluded its original run on January 19, 2011.

== Episodes ==
- LaVan Davis appeared in all the episodes.
- Cassi Davis was absent for four episodes.
- Allen Payne was absent for twelve episodes.
- Demetria McKinney was absent for fourteen episodes.
- Lance Gross was absent for fifteen episodes.
- Keshia Knight Pulliam was absent for nineteen episodes.
- China Anne McClain was absent for twenty-four episodes.
- Larramie "Doc" Shaw was absent for thirty-five episodes.
- Denise Burse was absent for thirty-six episodes.

No. overall	No. in season	Title	Directed by	Written by	Original release date	Prod. code
137	1	"Where's the Payne?"	Kim Fields	Steve Coulter	November 4, 2009	401
Curtis' forced retirement creates obstacles, but the drama spikes when Miranda suddenly goes missing; Claretha returns without her husband and moves in with Curtis and Ella. Note: This episode marks the return of Claretha Jenkins (Denise Burse). Absent: Allen Payne as C.J., Larramie "Doc" Shaw as Malik, Demetria McKinney as Janine and Keshia Knight Pulliam as Miranda
138	2	"Recurring Paynes"	Kim Fields	Robin M. Henry	November 4, 2009	402
With Miranda still missing, her mother storms over to the Paynes', blames Calvin for the disappearance, and calls the police on him. Meanwhile, a secret about Curtis' forced retirement is revealed; C.J., Janine, and Jazmine return, hoping to move back in; and Jazmine has changed and wearing a school uniform since she was attending a school for gifted children. Guest star: Valarie Pettiford as Sandra Lucas Note: Keshia Knight Pulliam was uncredited for this episode. However, she appears in the closing moments of the episode. This episode marks the return of Jazmine Payne (China Anne McClain). This episode marks the return of C.J. Payne (Allen Payne) who was absent for eighteen episodes in the fifth season. Absent: Denise Burse as Claretha
139	3	"Wigging Out"	Kim Fields	Don Woodard	November 11, 2009	403
Miranda finally returns and tells Calvin there is no baby. Despite all his efforts, Miranda refuses to let him stay in the condo, so he must move back in with Curtis and Ella. Meanwhile, Claretha decides to start a home business. Absent: Larramie "Doc" Shaw as Malik and China Anne McClain as Jazmine
140	4	"Payne Speaking"	Kim Fields	Don Woodard	November 11, 2009	404
Curtis protests his retirement at City Hall and C.J. tells him he's taking his job at the firehouse. Meanwhile, Ella battles the innovative new pastor's plans to shut down the Help Center to make way for a new multimedia outreach program. Guest star: James Black as Reverend Jordan Absent: Denise Burse as Claretha, Lance Gross as Calvin, Larramie "Doc" Shaw as Malik and Keshia Knight Pulliam as Miranda
141	5	"Parental Payne"	Kim Fields	Brian Egeston	November 18, 2009	405
Calvin confronts Miranda, thinking she had an abortion. Meanwhile, the school casts Malik in its production of Othello but the supposedly-bigoted father of the white girl cast opposite Malik won't let him kiss her in the play. Absent: Allen Payne as C.J., Denise Burse as Claretha, Demetria McKinney as Janine and China Anne McClain as Jazmine
142	6	"Payne, Payne Go Away"	Kim Fields	Erika Kaestle and Stacey Evans Morgan	November 18, 2009	406
C.J., Janine, and the children move out of the Paynes'--and Floyd moves in after his divorce. Jazmine, feeling ignored and jealous, runs away. Absent: Denise Burse as Claretha, Lance Gross as Calvin and Keshia Knight Pulliam as Miranda
143	7	"Marriage Paynes"	Kim Fields	Daniel Beaty and Stacey Evans Morgan	November 25, 2009	407
All 3 Payne couples (Curtis and Ella, C.J. and Janine, and Calvin and Miranda) go on an eye-opening marriage retreat, and Claretha and Floyd must babysit the twins. At the retreat's end, Miranda asks Calvin for a divorce. Absent: Larramie "Doc" Shaw as Malik and China Anne McClain as Jazmine
144	8	"Ms. Curtis"	Kim Fields	Spencer Gilbert	December 2, 2009	408
Calvin and Miranda get trapped in an elevator together, a chance to overcome their marriage problems before they reach the dreaded "33rd Floor." Meanwhile, Curtis unwittingly takes Ella's estrogen pills. Absent: Denise Burse as Claretha, Larramie "Doc" Shaw as Malik and Demetria McKinney as Janine
145	9	"Oh, Christmas Payne"	Chip Hurd	Brian Egeston & Torian Hughes	December 9, 2009	409
Family and friends share their different versions of the Nativity story when Jazmine fails to appreciate the real meaning of Christmas. Goof: Ella refers to Curtis being teased at his retirement roast--which is yet to happen in the upcoming episode "How Do You Like Your Roast?". Special Guest stars: David Mann as Mr. Brown and Tamela Mann as Cora Simmons
146	10	"Til Payne Do We Part"	Chip Hurd	Adam Szymkowicz	December 23, 2009	410
Curtis and Ella are shocked to learn that they're not legally married; Claretha and Floyd convince them to enjoy single life. Guest star: Judith Scott as Prudence Absent: Allen Payne as C.J., Larramie "Doc" Shaw as Malik, China Anne McClain as Jazmine, Demetria McKinney as Janine and Keshia Knight Pulliam as Miranda
147	11	"Payneful Reunion"	Chip Hurd	Torian Hughes	March 3, 2010	411
When Ella tries to arrange a family reunion, a chagrined Jazmine opposes the idea of connecting with her extended family, so Curtis and Ella try to teach her about honoring her heritage and gets trapped as a slave to work for Ella and Curtis Absent: Allen Payne as C.J., Larramie "Doc" Shaw as Malik, Denise Burse as Claretha, Demetria McKinney as Janine and Keshia Knight Pulliam as Miranda
148	12	"From the Mouths of Babes"	Kim Fields	Lisa Michelle Payton	March 3, 2010	412
The birth-control issue divides C.J. and Janine; Calvin and Miranda spend a day of surprises with Jazmine. Absent: Cassi Davis as Ella, Larramie "Doc" Shaw as Malik and Denise Burse as Claretha
149	13	"Blackout X 3"	Kim Fields	Adam Szymkowicz	March 10, 2010	413
A blackout sheds light on all 3 Payne couples when it takes Curtis, CJ and Calvin from their televised football game and gives them spontaneous quality time with their wives. Absent: China Anne McClain as Jazmine, Larramie "Doc" Shaw as Malik and Denise Burse as Claretha
150	14	"Lady Sings the Blues"	Chip Hurd	Steve Coulter & Don Woodard	March 10, 2010	414
The Paynes worry that the newly-happy Janine might be returning to drugs when her former dealer Blue, returns; Curtis becomes captivated by Japanese culture. Absent: Lance Gross as Calvin, Larramie "Doc" Shaw as Malik, Denise Burse as Claretha and Keshia Knight Pulliam as Miranda
151	15	"Something's Brewing"	Chip Hurd	Don Woodard & Steve Coulter	March 17, 2010	415
Janine cares for her dying former dealer, jeopardizing her relationship with C.J.; Floyd and Curtis launch a beer-brewing business. While at the help center C.J. and Janine pray that Blue will be led to Heaven while dying. Absent: Lance Gross as Calvin, Larramie "Doc" Shaw as Malik, China Anne McClain as Jazmine, Denise Burse as Claretha and Keshia Knight Pulliam as Miranda
152	16	"Seal of Approval"	Chip Hurd	Robin M. Henry & Don Woodard	March 17, 2010	416
Malik's decision to join the ROTC upsets Janine; the fire department hires Curtis--just not in the capacity he expected. Absent: Lance Gross as Calvin, Denise Burse as Claretha and Keshia Knight Pulliam as Miranda
153	17	"Payneful Pie"	Chip Hurd	Kellie Zimmerman-Green	March 24, 2010	417
Ella breaks news that creates a downturn in Curtis' financial plans. Elsewhere, Calvin squares off against Miranda's critical mother. Guest star: Valarie Pettiford as Sandra Lucas Absent: Allen Payne as C.J., Larramie "Doc" Shaw as Malik, Denise Burse as Claretha, China Anne McClain as Jazmine and Demetria McKinney as Janine
154	18	"How Do You Like Your Roast?"	Chip Hurd	Robin M. Henry & Steve Coulter	March 24, 2010	418
Curtis is the man of honor at a surprise retirement party, but the event doesn't go well as planned; Jazmine experiences her first crush. Absent: Larramie "Doc" Shaw as Malik, Denise Burse as Claretha and Keshia Knight Pulliam as Miranda
155	19	"Curtis Sings the Blues"	Chip Hurd	Robin M. Henry & Don Woodard	March 31, 2010	419
Curtis spirals into a depressive funk following successive life-altering events, but he gets support from an unlikely source. Elsewhere, Calvin and Miranda compete against C.J. and Janine in a bid for a weekend getaway. Guest star: Ben Vereen as Clarence Absent: Larramie "Doc" Shaw as Malik, Denise Burse as Claretha and China Anne McClain as Jazmine
156	20	"Firestorm"	Chip Hurd	Torian Hughes	March 31, 2010	420
During a fire routine, a fireman dies under C.J.'s authority and he blames himself. Meanwhile, Ella studies a book at school and recommends it to Miranda and Claretha. Absent: Larramie "Doc" Shaw as Malik, Lance Gross as Calvin and China Anne McClain as Jazmine
157	21	"Heartbeat"	Chip Hurd	Brian Egeston	April 7, 2010	421
A pregnancy scare upends Calvin and Miranda's world. Elsewhere, Curtis' sales scheme lands him in trouble with the law. Absent: Allen Payne as C.J., Larramie "Doc" Shaw as Malik, Demetria McKinney as Janine and China Anne McClain as Jazmine
158	22	"Through the Fire"	Chip Hurd	Robin M. Henry	April 7, 2010	422
Janine's mother arrives to a downcast C.J.'s immense annoyance. Elsewhere, Curtis guest-stars on a morning TV show. Guest star: Anne-Marie Johnson as Liz Shelton Absent: Lance Gross as Calvin, Larramie "Doc" Shaw as Malik, Denise Burse as Claretha and Keshia Knight Pulliam as Miranda
159	23	"The Bible: King Payne's Version"	Chip Hurd	Don Woodard	April 14, 2010	423
Ella futilely tries to fit in with college-age peers in her study group; Curtis offers his own unique spin on religion when he teaches at Jazmine's Bible school. Absent: Allen Payne as C.J., Lance Gross as Calvin, Larramie "Doc" Shaw as Malik, Denise Burse as Claretha, Demetria McKinney as Janine and Keshia Knight Pulliam as Miranda
160	24	"Matured Investment"	Chip Hurd	Torian Hughes	April 14, 2010	424
A different side of Calvin blossoms when he cares for Calvin Jr. Elsewhere, new neighbors arrive--with unique notions on relationships. Guest stars: Richard Lawson as Mitch and Vanessa Bell Calloway as Fiona Absent: Allen Payne as C.J., Larramie "Doc" Shaw as Malik, Denise Burse as Claretha, China Anne McClain as Jazmine and Demetria McKinney as Janine
161	25	"Who's Your Daddy Now?"	Chip Hurd	Brian Egeston	April 21, 2010	425
C.J. at long last meets his birth father, bit the surprise has unexpected results; Curtis helps Jazmine choose a musical instrument to learn. Guest star: William Katt as Clive James Absent: Lance Gross as Calvin, Denise Burse as Claretha, Larramie "Doc" Shaw as Malik and Keshia Knight Pulliam as Miranda
162	26	"Feet of Clay"	Chip Hurd	Don Woodard	April 21, 2010	426
Curtis' old pal Big Jesse, resurfaces, but he has seriously changed. Meanwhile, Calvin works to awe a nursery-school recruiter in the hopes of getting his child enrolled. Guest star: J. Anthony Brown as Big Jesse Absent: Allen Payne as C.J., Larramie "Doc" Shaw as Malik, Denise Burse as Claretha, China Anne McClain as Jazmine and Demetria McKinney as Janine
163	27	"Date Night x 3"	Chip Hurd	Adam Szymkowicz	April 28, 2010	427
The Payne men are pressured to take their wives out on the town; Curtis and Ella get locked out of their home and later has dinner in the backyard. Guest star: Brian Palermo as Phillipe Absent: Larramie "Doc" Shaw as Malik, Denise Burse as Claretha and China Anne McClain as Jazmine
164	28	"Watch the Son Shine"	Chip Hurd	Brian Egeston & Adam Szymkowicz	April 28, 2010	428
Calvin and Ella work on a school project; Curtis gets pointers for his first post-retirement from Malik. Absent: Allen Payne as C.J., Denise Burse as Claretha, China Anne McClain as Jazmine, Demetria McKinney as Janine and Keshia Knight Pulliam as Miranda
165	29	"The Drinking Game"	Chip Hurd	Karen Felix and Don Woodard	May 5, 2010	429
Malik and his friend Kevin exploit the freedom of being home alone, but later have experience of alcohol drinking; Curtis and Ella dine at a top-notch resident but Curtis tangles with a snobby waiter. Guest star: Brian Palermo as Phillipe Absent: Lance Gross as Calvin, Denise Burse as Claretha, China Anne McClain as Jazmine and Keshia Knight Pulliam as Miranda
166	30	"Who's On Top?"	Chip Hurd	Robin M. Henry & Torian Hughes	May 5, 2010	430
C.J. meets his new boss; Floyd's ex-wife Vernita reappears, pulling Curtis and Ella into messy love-triangle drama. Guest star: Penny Johnson Jerald as Maxine "Max" Bannon Absent: Lance Gross as Calvin, Larramie "Doc" Shaw as Malik, China Anne McClain as Jazmine and Keshia Knight Pulliam as Miranda
167	31	"Help, Help, Help"	Chip Hurd	Brian Egeston & Robin M. Henry	May 12, 2010	431
A flood closes the help center, forcing Ella to work at home--or try to, amidst all the drama. Elsewhere, Calvin and Miranda has Calvin Jr. living with them after Tracie and her husband were in a severe auto accident which results in Tracie in a coma and her husband dead. Absent: Allen Payne as C.J., Denise Burse as Claretha, Larramie "Doc" Shaw as Malik, China Anne McClain as Jazmine and Demetria McKinney as Janine
168	32	"Stinging Payne"	Chip Hurd	Don Woodard	May 12, 2010	432
C.J. enlists Curtis to help him set a trap for his new boss; Calvin and Miranda's financial condition worsens. Guest star: Penny Johnson Jerald as Maxine "Max" Bannon Absent: Cassi Davis as Ella, Denise Burse as Claretha, Larramie "Doc" Shaw as Malik and China Anne McClain as Jazmine
169	33	"Worth Fighting For"	Chip Hurd	Torian Hughes	May 19, 2010	433
Malik tries to win over an upperclassman by dueling with a bully. Meanwhile, Calvin puts into motion a plan to solve his financial problems. Guest star: Tanisha Lynn as Tory Absent: Denise Burse as Claretha, China Anne McClain as Jazmine and Demetria McKinney as Janine
170	34	"Who's Your Nanny?"	Chip Hurd	Robin M. Henry & Adam Szymkowicz	May 19, 2010	434
Tracie announces the loss of her husband and asks Calvin and Miranda to look after Calvin Jr.; C.J. is chagrined when overworked Janine decides to hire a nanny. Guest star: Eva Marcille as Tracie and Crystal R. Fox as C.J. & Janine's nanny/housekeeper Absent: Denise Burse as Claretha, Cassi Davis as Ella and Larramie "Doc" Shaw as Malik
171	35	"The Chef"	Chip Hurd	Anthony C. Hill	May 26, 2010	435
Malik lies to his girlfriend that he's a gourmet chef, then asks Curtis to help him prepare something impressive. Meanwhile, Calvin's second job keeps him away from Miranda. Guest star: Tanisha Lynn as Tory Absent: Allen Payne as C.J., Denise Burse as Claretha, China Anne McClain as Jazmine and Demetria McKinney as Janine
172	36	"My Fair Curtis"	Chip Hurd	Don Woodard	May 26, 2010	436
Hoping to win Claretha's heart, Floyd enlists Curtis and Ella's help; C.J.'s boss bombards him with advances. Guest stars: Penny Johnson Jerald as Maxine "Max" Bannon and Brian Palermo as Phillipe Absent: Lance Gross as Calvin, Larramie "Doc" Shaw as Malik, China Anne McClain as Jazmine and Keshia Knight Pulliam as Miranda
173	37	"Rest for the Weary"	Chip Hurd	Brian Egeston	June 2, 2010	437
Calvin falls into peril when he takes on two jobs. Meanwhile, Janine's home life suffers when she scores a promotion. Absent: Denise Burse as Claretha and Larramie "Doc" Shaw as Malik
174	38	"Thug Life"	Chip Hurd	Torian Hughes	June 2, 2010	438
Big Jesse reappears and inches closer to Ella, triggering jealousy in Curtis. Meanwhile, Malik faces the consequences of hanging out with some bad folks. Guest stars: J. Anthony Brown as Big Jessie Absent: Denise Burse as Claretha, Lance Gross as Calvin, China Anne McClain as Jazmine and Keshia Knight Pulliam as Miranda
175	39	"Rehabilitation"	Chip Hurd	Adam Szymkowicz	June 9, 2010	439
C.J. protests when Malik's crime partner appears; Curtis starts a barbershop in the backyard. Bobbi Baker as Kiki has a special appearance in this episode. Absent: Denise Burse as Claretha, Lance Gross as Calvin and Keshia Knight Pulliam as Miranda
176	40	"A Payne In Need Is A Pain Indeed"	Chip Hurd	Don Woodard	June 9, 2010	440
Tracie's unexpected visits to the house come under scrutiny; after Ms. Wilhelmina quits, C.J. and Janine enlist Curtis as babysitter. Guest star: Eva Marcille as Tracie Absent: Denise Burse as Claretha and Larramie "Doc" Shaw as Malik
177	41	"House Guest"	Chip Hurd	David A. Arnold	January 5, 2011	441
Ella helps a domestic abuse victim; C.J. and Jazmine anticipate for the father-daughter dance. Guest star: Essence Atkins as Monica Absent: Denise Burse as Claretha, Lance Gross as Calvin, Larramie "Doc" Shaw as Malik and Keshia Knight Pulliam as Miranda
178	42	"Payne Showers"	Chip Hurd	Omega Mariaunnie Stewart and Torian Hughes	January 5, 2011	442
Ella sets up a baby shower for Miranda while Curtis plans a "man shower" for Calvin. Guest star: Essence Atkins as Monica, Eva Marcille as Tracie and Valarie Pettiford as Mrs. Lucas Absent: Larramie "Doc" Shaw as Malik and China Anne McClain as Jazmine
179	43	"Playing With Fire"	Chip Hurd	Carlos Portugal	January 12, 2011	443
Monica helps out around in C.J. and Janine's house. Tracie demands child support from Calvin. Guest star: Essence Atkins as Monica and Eva Marcille as Tracie Absent: Cassi Davis as Ella, Denise Burse as Claretha and Larramie "Doc" Shaw as Malik
180	44	"When the Payne's Away"	Chip Hurd	Kristin Topps and Don Woodard	January 12, 2011	444
C.J. and Monica goes to the movies while Janine is out of town. Guest star: Essence Atkins as Monica Absent: Denise Burse as Claretha and Larramie "Doc" Shaw as Malik
181	45	"Beginnings"	Chip Hurd	Myra J.	January 19, 2011	445
The family reminisce as Curtis decides to sell the Payne house. Note: Larramie "Doc" Shaw didn't appear in this episode. However, he was credited due to his appearance in flashbacks. Absent: Denise Burse as Claretha and Larramie "Doc" Shaw as Malik
182	46	"Payneful Resolution"	Chip Hurd	Anthony C. Hill	January 19, 2011	446
Curtis and Ella are given a lucrative offer for their house. Miranda goes into labor and is taken to the hospital. Calvin finally graduates college but is then arrested for back child support. Monica returns and tells C.J. of her new job. They then kiss before Janine finds out, leaving the episode in a cliffhanger. Guest star: Essence Atkins as Monica Note: Jazmine makes her final beginning with this episode. Absent: Denise Burse as Claretha and Larramie "Doc" Shaw as Malik
