= Tyler Perry's House of Payne season 2 =

Tyler Perry's House of Payne
- Season 2
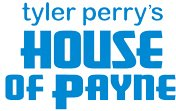
- No. of episodes: 100

Release
- Original network: TBS
- Original release: June 6, 2007 – August 4, 2008

Season chronology
- ← Previous; Season 1 Next → Season 3

The second season of Tyler Perry's House of Payne began airing on June 6, 2007, and concluded on August 6, 2008. The season contained 100 episodes.

== Cast ==
=== Main cast ===
- LaVan Davis as Curtis Payne
- Cassi Davis as Ella Payne
- Lance Gross as Calvin Payne
- Allen Payne as Clarence James (C.J.) Payne, Jr.
- Larramie "Doc" Shaw as Malik Payne
- China Anne McClain as Jazmine Payne
- Demetria McKinney as Janine Payne
- Denise Burse as Claretha Jenkins
- Keisha Knight Pulliam as Miranda Lucas (episodes 72-100, guest star in episode 25)

=== Recurring cast ===
- Joyce Giraud as Angel O. Reilz
- Bart Hansard as Bart Holmes
- Cedric Pendleton as Keenan Jared
- Robinne Lee as Nicole Jamieson
- Kyre Batiste-Loftin as Kevin
- Quincy Bonds as Pookie
- Clayton English as Peanut
- Eva Marcille as Tracie
- Robin Givens as Tanya

=== Guest stars ===
- David Mann as Mr. Brown
- George Wallace as Jimmy
- Daniele Gaither as Smokey
- Lisa Arrindell Anderson as Dr. Gilrest
- Tyler Perry as Madea
- Keke Palmer as Nikki
- Tamela Mann as Cora Brown
- Lamman Rucker as Will Brown

== Episodes ==
No. overall	No. in season	Title	Directed by	Written by	Original release date	Prod. code
Part 1
11	1	"Bully and the Beast"	Tyler Perry	Kellie R. Griffin	June 6, 2007	201
In the series premiere, also the second season premiere, Curtis becomes tired of all the people in his house. Meanwhile, Malik is being bullied by a girl at school who is taking his lunch money. Curtis tries to reconcile the situation but doesn't get along with the girl's foster mother, Madea. ''Crossover: This episode proves that Madea's Family Reunion is a part of the same reality as House of Payne. Guest stars: Keke Palmer as Nikki, Tyler Perry as Madea Absent: Denise Burse as Claretha
12	2	"I Can Cry If I Want To"	Tyler Perry	Michelle L. Johnson	June 6, 2007	202
While the family tries to plan a surprise party for Curtis' 50th birthday, Curtis tries to regain his youth. During the party the guys are called out for a fire that ends up being at C.J. and Janine's house. This forces C.J., Janine, Malik and Jazmine to move in with Curtis and Ella. ''Crossover: This episode proves that Meet the Browns is a part of the same reality as House of Payne. Guest star: David Mann as Mr. Brown
13	3	"More Than Meets the Eye"	Tyler Perry	Christopher J. Moore	June 13, 2007	203
C.J. finds out the fire at his house was arson. Meanwhile, Janine's strange behavior is questioned by the family, especially Curtis, who thinks Janine is cheating on C.J. with her mysterious friend Blue. Absent: Denise Burse as Claretha
14	4	"Busted"	Tyler Perry	Jenee V. Giles	June 13, 2007	204
The family continues to question Janine's odd behavior before realizing she is on drugs. The shocking discovery also unlocks another hidden revelation. Meanwhile, Calvin sells knock off designer purses to make some extra money.
15	5	"Lost and Found"	Tyler Perry	Carmelita Arroyo	June 20, 2007	205
Curtis is required to take an anger management class, but the upbeat instructor doesn't seem to suppress his anger. Later, the guys go to the crack house to help bring Janine home. Janine agrees to go to rehab but the family wakes up to find her missing. Absent: Denise Burse as Claretha
16	6	"Down and Outted"	Tyler Perry	Christopher J. Moore	June 20, 2007	206
Curtis thinks Malik is gay after seeing him wear a tutu. Meanwhile, Curtis offers some of his and Ella's retirement money to C.J. in order to jump start him and the kids moving out. Absent: Denise Burse as Claretha
17	7	"No Money, Mo' Problems"	Tyler Perry	Anita M. Cal	June 27, 2007	207
C.J. accepts Curtis and Ella's money offer, but when he uses the money to put Janine in rehab she checks herself out, causing C.J. to lose the money and find a way to break the news to Curtis. Meanwhile, Calvin shows off Curtis and Ella's house as his own to impress a girl. Absent: Denise Burse as Claretha
18	8	"Just Say No"	Tyler Perry	Steve Coulter, Dee Wagner	June 27, 2007	208
A school assembly about "Say No To Drugs" upsets Jazmine, because of Janine's drug problems. Meanwhile, the firefighters protest after Curtis refuses to replace the broken television at the firehouse. Absent: Denise Burse as Claretha
19	9	"Surprise, Surprise"	Tyler Perry	Shontell McClain	July 4, 2007	209
Janine's parents show up looking for her. Claretha believes she knows Janine's father. Guest stars: Dorian Harewood as Larry Shelton, Anne-Marie Johnson as Liz Shelton Absent: Demetria McKinney as Janine
20	10	"Father Knows Best"	Tyler Perry	Joseph Hampton	July 4, 2007	210
Janine's parents return and want custody of the kids. The firefighters "misplace" the fire truck. Guest stars: Dorian Harewood as Larry Shelton, Anne-Marie Johnson as Liz Shelton Absent: Denise Burse as Claretha and Demetria McKinney as Janine
21	11	"I Keep Coming Up Short"	Tyler Perry	Teri Jackson	July 11, 2007	211
Curtis has impotency issues. Meanwhile, C.J. tries to work out his debt. Absent: Demetria McKinney as Janine, Larramie "Doc" Shaw as Malik and China Anne McClain as Jazmine
22	12	"The Buck Stops Here"	Tyler Perry	Carmelita Arroyo	July 11, 2007	212
The firefighters do a pinup calendar as a fundraiser and are surprised when a new firefighter assigned to the house is a woman named Angel. Meanwhile, Jazmine sells candy for her school. Absent: Denise Burse as Claretha and Demetria McKinney as Janine
23	13	"Wax On, Wax Off"	Tyler Perry	Anita M. Cal	July 18, 2007	213
Malik's going through puberty and the women in the house are clueless. Meanwhile, a failing inspection at the firehouse is Curtis's fault. Absent: Demetria McKinney as Janine
24	14	"Head of the Class"	Tyler Perry	Steve Coulter, Dee Wagner	July 18, 2007	214
Jazmine runs for class president. Meanwhile, Curtis and Ella take an art class together with models. Absent: Denise Burse as Claretha and Demetria McKinney as Janine
25	15	"Paternity and Fraternity: Part 1"	Tyler Perry	Kellie R. Griffin	July 25, 2007	215
An old high school flame of C.J.'s comes back in his life with a claim that is bound to rock his world. Meanwhile, Malik's hanging around a bad group of kids and gets into trouble. To be continued... Guest star: Sierra Aylina McClain as Jasmine Note: Sierra Aylina McClain is China Anne McClain's real life sister Absent: Denise Burse as Claretha and Demetria McKinney as Janine
26	16	"Paternity and Fraternity: Part 2"	Tyler Perry	Kellie R. Griffin	July 25, 2007	216
C.J. gets the results of the paternity test. And after a heated discussion with Malik, C.J. finally understands the revelations of Janine's situation has major effects on the kids. Meanwhile, Bart does some extreme stunts while the firefighters place bets on him. Guest star: Sierra Aylina McClain as Jasmine Absent: Denise Burse as Claretha and Demetria McKinney as Janine
27	17	"Cracking Under Pressure"	Tyler Perry	Lamont Ferrell	August 1, 2007	217
Janine and her associates from the crack-house break in and steal from the Payne's house. Meanwhile, Calvin trains for a marathon. Absent: Denise Burse as Claretha
28	18	"Club PCP"	Tyler Perry	Kellie R. Griffin	August 1, 2007	218
Calvin plans a house party when the rest of the family visits relatives in Florida. Absent: Allen Payne as C.J., LaVan Davis as Curtis, Cassi Davis as Ella, Denise Burse as Claretha, Larramie "Doc" Shaw as Malik, China Anne McClain as Jazmine and Demetria McKinney as Janine
29	19	"Sadly Mistaken"	Tyler Perry	Teri Jackson	August 8, 2007	219
Janine's associate, Beverly, steals Ella's identity, causing Ella to be briefly jailed for check kiting. Afterward, Ella feels compelled to confront Janine at the crack house. Meanwhile, Calvin crams for mid-terms. Absent: Denise Burse as Claretha
30	20	"And Justice for All"	Tyler Perry	Lamont Ferrell	August 8, 2007	220
Malik and Kevin meet someone on the Internet, who turns out to be a man. Meanwhile, Curtis and Claretha have jury duty together. Absent: Cassi Davis as Ella, China Anne McClain as Jazmine and Demetria McKinney as Janine
31	21	"I Got the Hook Up"	Tyler Perry	Teri Jackson	August 15, 2007	221
Everyone tries to hook C.J. up on a date. Meanwhile, a woman who's HIV-positive volunteers at the Help Center. Guest star: Kaira Whitehead as Karen Note: This episode featured Cassi Davis informing viewers about HIV and AIDS. Absent: Larramie "Doc" Shaw as Malik, China Anne McClain as Jazmine and Demetria McKinney as Janine
32	22	"Absolutely Positive"	Tyler Perry	Joseph Hampton	August 15, 2007	222
Curtis gets a colonoscopy and thinks he's dying. Meanwhile, Calvin goes on a date with Karen, the woman who's HIV-positive. Guest star: Kaira Whitehead as Karen Note: This episode featured LaVan Davis informing viewers about colonoscopy. Absent: Allen Payne as C.J. and Demetria McKinney as Janine
33	23	"Teacher's Pet"	Tyler Perry	Anita M. Cal	August 22, 2007	223
After Jazmine "rescues" a hamster from her school, assistant principal Nicole Jamieson comes to the Payne household to investigate, sparking a schoolboy crush from Malik. When Malik finds out that Jazmine did abscond with the hamster, the two kids make a pact to keep it a secret. Soon, Calvin gets involved, and mayhem becomes the order of the day. Guest star: Robinne Lee as Nicole Jamieson Note: This episode was dedicated to China Anne McClain's hamster, Perry, who died prior to this episode. Absent: Allen Payne as C.J., Denise Burse as Claretha and Demetria McKinney as Janine
34	24	"The Perfect Storm"	Tyler Perry	Christopher J. Moore	August 22, 2007	224
The firehouse is overwhelmed by a nasty storm that hits Atlanta. Miscommunication about retrieving the kids from school causes a mix up that leads to everyone taking shelter at the firehouse and sparks flying between C.J. and the assistant principal. Guest star: Robinne Lee as Nicole Jamieson Absent: Demetria McKinney as Janine
35	25	"Sad, Sad Leroy Brown: Part 1"	Tyler Perry	Steve Coulter, Dee Wagner	August 29, 2007	225
A neighbor, Mr Brown, moves in with the Paynes after a fire renders his home uninhabitable, but the man soon emerges as an annoying houseguest. Elsewhere, Calvin finds romance---with a con artist named Miranda. To be continued... Guest stars: Keshia Knight Pulliam as Miranda Lucas, David Mann as Mr. Brown and Tamela Mann as Cora Brown Note: Keshia Knight Pulliam makes her first appearance as Miranda Lucas. Absent: Allen Payne as C.J., Denise Burse as Claretha, Larramie "Doc" Shaw as Malik, China Anne McClain as Jazmine and Demetria McKinney as Janine
36	26	"Sad, Sad Leroy Brown: Part 2"	Tyler Perry	Kellie R. Griffin	August 29, 2007	226
Tension escalates between Curtis and Mr. Brown, a Payne houseguest in the wake of his home fire. Meanwhile, Malik gets a tattoo and comes to regret that decision. Guest stars: David Mann as Mr. Brown and Tamela Mann as Cora Brown Absent: Allen Payne as C.J., Lance Gross as Calvin, Denise Burse as Claretha and Demetria McKinney as Janine
37	27	"Weeping May Endure for a Night"	Tyler Perry	Kellie R. Griffin, Joseph Hampton	September 5, 2007	227
Mr. Brown, Cora and Will come by the Paynes after Pop Brown's funeral. Brown is upset because Pop Brown left him his run down house which makes Brown think his Daddy really hates him. After going on another bad date, Calvin starts a website called "She's A Whack" (shesawhack.com) only for it to backfire on him. Guest stars: David Mann as Mr. Brown, Tamela Mann as Cora Brown and Lamman Rucker as Will Brown Note: This episode serves as the backdoor pilot for Tyler Perry's Meet the Browns. Absent: Allen Payne as C.J., Denise Burse as Claretha, Larramie "Doc" Shaw as Malik, China Anne McClain as Jazmine and Demetria McKinney as Janine
38	28	"The Big Test"	Tyler Perry	Steve Coulter, Dee Wagner	September 5, 2007	228
C.J. has a date with Nicole who tells him she is waiting until she is married before having sex. Meanwhile, Jazmine cheats on a test. Guest star: Robinne Lee as Nicole Jamieson Absent: LaVan Davis as Curtis, Cassi Davis as Ella, Denise Burse as Claretha and Demetria McKinney as Janine
39	29	"Balancing Act"	Tyler Perry	Kellie R. Griffin	September 12, 2007	229
C.J. tries to find time for Nicole without neglecting the children. Meanwhile, Jazmine hopes a new look will attract the attention of Malik's friend. Guest star: Robinne Lee as Nicole Jamieson Absent: Denise Burse as Claretha, Lance Gross as Calvin and Demetria McKinney as Janine
40	30	"Why Can't We Be Friends"	Tyler Perry	Steve Coulter, Dee Wagner	September 12, 2007	230
Jazmine's friend, Tiffany, convinces Jazmine that C.J. is going to marry Nicole and move to San Francisco with Nicole just like her Dad did when he remarried. Jazmine and Tiffany devise a plan to break up C.J. and Nicole. Meanwhile, Curtis and Malik clean out the garage and bond. Guest star: Robinne Lee as Nicole Jamieson Absent: Denise Burse as Claretha, Lance Gross as Calvin and Demetria McKinney as Janine
41	31	"Dog Day Afternoon"	Tyler Perry	Christopher J. Moore	September 19, 2007	231
While Malik must make a documentary for a school assignment, Curtis is unknowingly roped into assisting a bank robber. Guest star: Robinne Lee as Nicole Jamieson Absent: Demetria McKinney as Janine
42	32	"New Beginnings"	Tyler Perry	Kellie R. Griffin	September 19, 2007	232
When his divorce from Janine is at last finalized, C.J. attempts to start life anew, and his firehouse buddies urge him to savor the single life. Meanwhile, Janine tries to reconnect with the Paynes, so Ella helps her get into a rehab facility which does not sit well with C.J. and Curtis. Absent: Larramie "Doc" Shaw as Malik and China Anne McClain as Jazmine
43	33	"Heavy Petting"	Tyler Perry	Carmelita Arroyo	September 19, 2007	233
When an old friend of C.J.'s turns up, they stir up jealousy in Nicole which causes C.J. and Nicole's budding romance to hit a bump. In the meantime, the Payne children push to get a pooch. Guest star: Robinne Lee as Nicole Jamieson Absent: Denise Burse as Claretha, Lance Gross as Calvin and Demetria McKinney as Janine
44	34	"The Fast and the Furious"	Tyler Perry	Michelle L. Johnson	September 19, 2007	234
Curtis must take an online driving course after he gets a speeding ticket. Meanwhile, Claretha and Ella clash over playing the lottery. Absent: Allen Payne as C.J., Larramie "Doc" Shaw as Malik, China Anne McClain as Jazmine and Demetria McKinney as Janine
45	35	"Gone in 60 Seconds"	Tyler Perry	Teri Jackson	September 26, 2007	235
Curtis surprises the family with a new motorcycle, but his new bike causes more trouble than any one family could ever imagine. Malik's new friend from New York convinces him to steal Curtis' motorcycle, leaving Curtis no choice but to press charges, causing Ella to kick him out of the house. (Part one of three.) Guest star: Robinne Lee as Nicole Jamieson and Eva Marcille as Tracie Absent: Denise Burse as Claretha and Demetria McKinney as Janine
46	36	"Lost Without U"	Tyler Perry	Carmelita Arroyo	September 26, 2007	236
C.J. and Nicole's relationship is seriously tested when Nicole's jealousy gets out of hand, but that's the least of C.J.'s problems. Curtis filed charges against Malik, who faces time in prison for stealing and wrecking Curtis' motorcycle. Meanwhile, the firehouse crew must find a way to get Curtis back into the house that Ella kicked him out of before they go insane. (Part two of three.) Guest star: Robinne Lee as Nicole Jamieson Absent: Denise Burse as Claretha, Larramie "Doc" Shaw as Malik, China Anne McClain as Jazmine and Demetria McKinney as Janine
47	37	"I Rest My Case"	Tyler Perry	Lamont Ferrell	September 26, 2007	237
Malik and his friend Kyle go to a court hearing for wrecking Curtis' bike, but Curtis' plan to teach the boys a lesson backfires when Malik and Kyle are each given an actual sentence, much to the family's horror. Now Curtis must do whatever it takes to reverse the outcome. (Part three of three) Guest star: Eva Marcille as Tracie Absent: Denise Burse as Claretha, Demetria McKinney as Janine
Part 2
48	38	"A House Is Not a Home"	Tyler Perry	Michelle L. Johnson	December 5, 2007	238
C.J. thinks he may have found the perfect new apartment for him and the kids, but he soon learns that his dream home is too good to be true. Curtis is ecstatic that C.J. and the kids are finally getting out of his house. Meanwhile, Ella has had enough of Janine once she learns that she has been taking advantage of her. Guest star: Eva Marcille as Tracie Absent: Denise Burse as Claretha and Lance Gross as Calvin
49	39	"Home Alone"	Tyler Perry	Teri Jackson	December 5, 2007	239
Just as C.J. and the kids adjust to their new surroundings, an unexpected break in changes everything. Meanwhile, Curtis and Ella are thrilled to have their home all to themselves again. Absent: Denise Burse as Claretha and Demetria McKinney as Janine
50	40	"The Wench Who Saved Christmas"	Tyler Perry	Jenée V. Giles	December 5, 2007	240
Christmas has arrived and everyone is excited...except for Curtis. When he learns that Ella decided to cancel their holiday vacation to help celebrate C.J. and the kids spending Christmas without Janine, Curtis throws a Scrooge-like tantrum. He returns to reality after being in a dream state where Madea haunts him into realizing the true meaning of the holiday season. Guest star: Tyler Perry as Madea; Absent: Denise Burse as Claretha and Demetria McKinney as Janine Note: This marks Tyler Perry's second appearance as Madea.
51	41	"Trial by Fire: Part 1"	Tyler Perry	Steve Coulter, Dee Wagner	December 5, 2007	241
When a raging house fire is reported in the neighborhood, Curtis and the other firefighters rush to the scene. Calvin believes that he has finally found the right opportunity to prove to himself what he can do in a perilous situation. An uncalculated move results in Calvin rushing to safety and C.J. remaining trapped inside underneath the rumble. Meanwhile, Malik tries to impress a girl. Absent: Denise Burse as Claretha and Demetria McKinney as Janine
52	42	"Trial by Fire: Part 2"	Tyler Perry	Joseph Hampton, Dani Renee	December 12, 2007	242
Curtis and his team continue to strategize the best way in order to rescue C.J., who remains trapped in the burning house unconscious. Meanwhile, Malik continues to win over his new crush, Taylor. Guest star: Robinne Lee as Nicole Jamieson Absent: Demetria McKinney as Janine
53	43	"Trial by Fire: Part 3"	Tyler Perry	Joseph Hampton, Dani Renee	December 12, 2007	243
As C.J. fights for his life, he regains consciousness while awaiting the help from the other firefighters. Guest stars: Robinne Lee as Nicole Jamieson, David Mann as Mr. Brown and Eva Marcille as Tracie Absent: Demetria McKinney as Janine
54	44	"Crazy In Love"	Tyler Perry	Michelle L. Johnson	December 12, 2007	244
An old friend of Curtis is in town and begins to set his sights on Claretha, much to the dismay of Ella. Meanwhile, C.J. is being stalked by a mentally unstable woman he rescued. Guest stars: George Wallace as Jimmy and Daniele Gaither as Smokey Absent: Demetria McKinney as Janine, Larramie "Doc" Shaw as Malik and China Anne McClain as Jazmine
55	45	"Reality Check"	Tyler Perry	Joseph Hampton, Christopher J. Moore	December 12, 2007	245
The firehouse becomes the subject of a new reality series about firefighters, but the producer of the show tampers with everyone's interviews by showing them in a not-so perfect image. Meanwhile, C.J. and Ella are at odds when Ella decides to takes the children to see their mother without C.J.'s consent. Absent: Demetria McKinney as Janine
56	46	"Piece of Mind"	Tyler Perry	Brandon Broussard, Dani Renee	December 19, 2007	246
Deciding on the best way to handle some of their brooding issues, the Payne household decide to seek a family therapist. After each member of the family has their one-on-one time with the therapist, the final result proves that the doctor is need of some psychiatric assistance of his own. Absent: Denise Burse as Claretha and Demetria McKinney as Janine
57	47	"There's No Place Like Home"	Tyler Perry	Teri Jackson	December 19, 2007	247
Janine is discharged from the rehabilitation center after successfully completing her program. She seeks help from Ella as she is nervous about her impending job interview and needs a place to stay for the night. Reluctantly, Ella goes beyond C.J.'s wishes and allows her to bunk on the couch, unbeknownst to the rest of the family. Meanwhile, Curtis decides to go on a diet after failing a physical exam.
58	48	"Mommie Dearest"	Tyler Perry	Kellie R. Griffin	December 26, 2007	248
C.J. is at odds with the family as they continue to allow Janine to live with them. The Payne family ties are once again tested when Malik becomes embarrassed by Janine's arrival as he wants to avoid being taunted by his classmates because of his troubled mother. Absent: Denise Burse as Claretha and Lance Gross as Calvin
59	49	"You Big Dummy"	Tyler Perry	Lamont Ferrell	December 26, 2007	249
Janine and C.J. are at odds when she takes the children out to an amusement park without C.J.'s consent. But the drama ensues when C.J. discovers that Calvin has been dating Tracie behind his back. Meanwhile, Curtis guides the firehouse into a mandatory CPR certification. Guest star: Eva Marcille as Tracie Absent: Denise Burse as Claretha
60	50	"It's a Boy"	Tyler Perry	Joseph Hampton	January 2, 2008	250
While the crew responds to an emergency call, Curtis finds himself all alone at the firehouse with a very pregnant woman. Meanwhile, Calvin and Tracie's relationship begins to wilt when Tracie questions if Calvin's ready for a mature relationship. Guest star: Eva Marcille as Tracie Absent: Cassi Davis as Ella, Denise Burse as Claretha, China Anne McClain as Jazmine and Demetria McKinney as Janine
61	51	"Aches and Paynes"	Tyler Perry	Brandon Broussard	January 2, 2008	251
Jazmine reveals her fear of visiting the dentist when she develops a painful toothache. Meanwhile, Calvin is devastated once he receives the news that Tracie wants to move back in with her ex and end their relationship. Calvin was heartbroken but Pookie and Peanut came to the rescue. Guest stars: Eva Marcille as Tracie, Clayton English as Peanut and Quincy Bonds as Pookie Absent: LaVan Davis as Curtis and Denise Burse as Claretha
62	52	"The Big Bang Theory"	Tyler Perry	Christopher J. Moore	January 9, 2008	252
Blue, Janine's former drug dealer, demands that he receives the money that she owes him or he will threaten to harm the family. Meanwhile, another bully at Malik's school starts to harass him. But he finds Curtis' gun in the closet and soon believes that he's found the answer to his problem. Absent: Denise Burse as Claretha
63	53	"Step It Up"	Tyler Perry	Jenee V. Giles, Christopher J. Moore	January 9, 2008	253
Ella's niece Renee comes from out of town to enter in the Health Center's College Scholarship Program, but she's mistreated because of the way she acts. Meanwhile Bart brings his obnoxious nephew Peter to the firehouse where he challenges Malik to a firemen's duel. Guest Star: Mystie Smith as Renee, Tommy Dimassimo as Peter Absent: Denise Burse as Claretha
64	54	"No Payne, No Gain"	Tyler Perry	Steve Coulter, Dee Wagner	January 16, 2008	254
A rat is at the firehouse and everyone has different ideas of how to get rid of it. Jazmine is sick but C.J. and Malik thinks she's faking. But when she has to go to the hospital Jazmine starts to take advantage of the family. Absent: Denise Burse as Claretha and Lance Gross as Calvin
65	55	"Devil in a Blue Suit"	Tyler Perry	Jenee V. Giles	January 16, 2008	255
The family is suspicious of Janine's actions. She tries to get rid of her former drug dealer, but he proves to be more dangerous than she could handle alone. So the rest of the family help her with the situation. Meanwhile, Malik sets out to buy new shoes by getting a job as a paperboy but he soon discovers that it's a lot of responsibility than he originally thought. Absent: Denise Burse as Claretha and Lance Gross as Calvin
66	56	"Bad Influence"	Tyler Perry	Teri Jackson	January 23, 2008	256
Ella is sick so Curtis has to do all the chores. Jazmine gets a part in the school play, but Janine takes it too far. Absent: Cassi Davis as Ella and Denise Burse as Claretha
67	57	"Play on Playa"	Tyler Perry	Shontell R. McClain	January 23, 2008	257
Angel invites her friend Dr. Gilrest to interview the firehouse for her book about stress interfering in the workplace, but she takes an interest in Calvin. Meanwhile Curtis is planning a poker party, but Ella wants him to watch Malik and Jazmine instead. Guest star: Lisa Arrindell Anderson as Dr. Gilrest Absent: Allen Payne as C.J., Demetria McKinney as Janine and Denise Burse as Claretha
68	58	"It's Getting Hot in Here"	Tyler Perry	Myra J.	January 30, 2008	258
Janine and C.J.'s friends invite them to a party, but they fail to realized that they're not married. Back at the firehouse Calvin convinces Curtis to let Pookie and Peanut to volunteer for their community service. At the end of the episode C.J. gets drunk and ask Janine to sleep with him. Guest star: Robin Givens as Tanya Absent: Denise Burse as Claretha
69	59	"Don't Get It Twisted"	Tyler Perry	Kellie R. Griffin	January 30, 2008	259
Continuing from the last episode C.J. and Janine decide to sleep together and the whole family (except Malik and Jazmine) find out including Claretha who was spying on them. Also someone thinks Curtis is sleeping with his wife so he sends Curtis threatening messages and packages. Absent: Larramie "Doc" Shaw as Malik and China Anne McClain as Jazmine
Part 3
70	60	"Wife Swap"	Tyler Perry	Kellie R. Griffin	March 5, 2008	260
Ella claims that Curtis takes her for granted, but Curtis learns his lesson when the always-sassy Madea materializes in one of his dreams as his wife. Elsewhere, Malik takes up football to woo a cheerleader. Guest star: Tyler Perry as Madea Note: Madea's 3rd appearance. Absent: Denise Burse as Claretha and Demetria McKinney as Janine
71	61	"Stop Being All Funky"	Tyler Perry	Kellie R. Griffin, Jenee V. Giles	March 5, 2008	261
Janine dates an ex-football star and C.J. goes out with Tanya. C.J. starts to feel uncomfortable when Janine's date gives out lavish gifts to Malik and Jazmine. Meanwhile, Curtis develops a man-crush on Janine's date. Guest stars: Robin Givens as Tanya and Michael Jai White as Bryan Absent: Denise Burse as Claretha and Lance Gross as Calvin
72	62	"Guess Who's Coming to Dinner?"	Tyler Perry	J.D. Walker	March 12, 2008	262
As Malik invites his new girlfriend to a Payne family dinner, Calvin again woos Miranda, who ripped him off during a previous romance but now insists she's changed her ways. Miranda's acceptance back into the Payne house is slow at first, but eventually she charms her way back. But Malik's girlfriend has a surprise that beats Miranda's return: she's pregnant. Note: Keshia Knight Pulliam returns to the show as a regular. Guest star:Jamila Thompson as Courtney Absent: Denise Burse as Claretha
73	63	"Game Over"	Tyler Perry	Buddy Lewis	March 12, 2008	263
Game night at the Paynes' heats up when Ella's old college friend arrives, bringing a damaging secret about her and Curtis that also sparks an argument among the younger couples. Guest stars: Robin Givens as Tanya, Iona Morris as Bernice and Michael Jai White as Bryan Absent: Denise Burse as Claretha, Larramie "Doc" Shaw as Malik and China Anne McClain as Jazmine
74	64	"Can I Get A Witness?"	Tyler Perry	Teri Jackson	March 19, 2008	264
Ella finds out she may have breast cancer; Calvin has witnessed a neighborhood crime and is tracked down. After Ella is tested, Janine decides to get tested and finds out that she is pregnant. (Part 1 of 2.) Note: The Barbershop is introduced. Absent: Denise Burse as Claretha and Keshia Knight Pulliam as Miranda
75	65	"Commencement Day"	Tyler Perry	Steve Coulter, Dee Wagner	March 19, 2008	265
Calvin finds out that he is graduating, but the school makes a mistake. Ella must keep Janine's pregnancy secret, which is impossible. (Part 2 of 2.) Absent: Allen Payne as C.J., Denise Burse as Claretha, Larramie "Doc" Shaw as Malik, China Anne McClain as Jazmine and Keshia Knight Pulliam as Miranda
76	66	"A Shock to the System"	Tyler Perry	Lamont Ferrell	March 26, 2008	266
Malik's best friend Kevin is injured in a hit-and-run accident; Calvin gets a new job, but gets fired the next day due to laziness. Absent: Denise Burse as Claretha, China Anne McClain as Jazmine, Demetria McKinney as Janine and Keshia Knight Pulliam as Miranda
77	67	"Compromising Position"	Tyler Perry	Christopher J. Moore	March 26, 2008	267
Curtis is offered a job in Los Angeles, but Ella doesn't want to move. Meanwhile, Tanya's friend makes a move on C.J. Guest stars: Robin Givens as Tanya and Tembi Locke as Lisa Absent: Denise Burse as Claretha, Larramie "Doc" Shaw as Malik, China Anne McClain as Jazmine, Demetria McKinney as Janine and Keshia Knight Pulliam as Miranda
78	68	"Moral Dilemma"	Tyler Perry	Joseph Hampton	April 2, 2008	268
The family must decide what to do with the $50,000 that C.J. finds in his truck. Absent: Denise Burse as Claretha and Keshia Knight Pulliam as Miranda
79	69	"Sex, Lies and Videotapes"	Tyler Perry	Pamela Brewster	April 2, 2008	269
C.J. finds out that Tanya was in a rap music video years ago. Meanwhile, the F.B.I. uses the Payne home for a stakeout. Guest star: Robin Givens as Tanya Absent: Larramie "Doc" Shaw as Malik, China Anne McClain as Jazmine, Demetria McKinney as Janine and Keshia Knight Pulliam as Miranda
80	70	"Time to Clean House"	Tyler Perry	Kellie R. Griffin	April 9, 2008	270
The family has had it with Calvin's ungrateful shenanigans, so they lay down some house rules. Calvin decides to move in with his girlfriend, who finds out just how dependent he is. Meanwhile, Malik and Jazmine help Claretha clean her house.
81	71	"Living With Liz"	Tyler Perry	Teri Jackson	April 9, 2008	271
Janine's mother moves in with the Paynes, and Janine has a hard time not revealing that she's pregnant. Liz has a secret too: her husband kicked her out of their home. Guest stars: Anne-Marie Johnson as Liz Shelton and Dorian Harewood as Larry Shelton Absent: Denise Burse as Claretha, Lance Gross as Calvin and Keshia Knight Pulliam as Miranda
82	72	"Beat Down"	Tyler Perry	Shontell R. McClain, Steve Coulter & Dee Wagner	April 16, 2008	272
Ella and Claretha help a church member who has an abusive boyfriend. Delante struggles on juggling two dates at the same time, which cause more drama at the barbershop. Absent: Allen Payne as C.J., LaVan Davis as Curtis, Larramie "Doc" Shaw as Malik, China Anne McClain as Jazmine, Demetria McKinney as Janine and Keshia Knight Pulliam as Miranda
83	73	"Expectations"	Tyler Perry	Jenee V. Giles	April 16, 2008	273
Janine's pregnancy is revealed at a social gathering; Curtis befriends a cable man who could possibly be his son. Guest stars: Robin Givens as Tanya and Michael Jai White as Bryan Absent: Denise Burse as Claretha, Lance Gross as Calvin, Larramie "Doc" Shaw as Malik, China Anne McClain as Jazmine and Keshia Knight Pulliam as Miranda
84	74	"Cheers"	Tyler Perry	Lemelle Frazier	April 23, 2008	274
Malik's scheme to get phone numbers from cheerleaders ends with him becoming a cheerleader. Meanwhile, Janine reveals her pregnancy to the children and prepares to move in with Bryan. Note: This episode marks the last appearance of Janine (Demetria McKinney) until her return in the Season 3 episode "To Have and To Hold". Absent: Denise Burse as Claretha, Lance Gross as Calvin and Keshia Knight Pulliam as Miranda
85	75	"R-E-S-P-E-C-T Me"	Tyler Perry	Joseph Hampton	April 23, 2008	275
Malik babysits Jazmine; the guys at the firehouse upset Angel. With Ella and Claretha's help they intent on doing role playing. Absent: Demetria McKinney as Janine and Keshia Knight Pulliam as Miranda
Part 4
86	76	"Driving Me Crazy"	Tyler Perry	Lamont Ferrell	June 4, 2008	276
Calvin babysits Miranda's nephew who is a major handful. Meanwhile, Claretha's car is stolen, and Ella must help her find it. Absent: Allen Payne as C.J., Larramie "Doc" Shaw as Malik, China Anne McClain as Jazmine, Demetria McKinney as Janine and Keshia Knight Pulliam as Miranda
87	77	"Reunited and... It Don't Feel Good"	Tyler Perry	Kellie R. Griffin	June 4, 2008	277
Curtis, Ella and Claretha host a mixer for their college reunion. C.J. tries to babysit Malik and Jazmine. Guest star: Dorien Wilson as Andrew and Sandy Brown as Cynthia Green Absent: Demetria McKinney as Janine and Keshia Knight Pulliam as Miranda
88	78	"What the-?"	Tyler Perry	Jenee V. Giles	June 4, 2008	278
Dana finally decides to settle down and date one guy. Everyone is happy for her except for Kiki--Dana is dating her younger brother. Meanwhile, Jazmine learns a curse word from Curtis. Absent: Allen Payne as C.J., Denise Burse as Claretha, Demetria McKinney as Janine and Keshia Knight Pulliam as Miranda
89	79	"Guys' Night Out, Girls' Night In"	Tyler Perry	Jenee V. Giles	June 4, 2008	279
Malik reluctantly goes on his first camping trip. Jazmine is upset she's not allowed to go, but lightens up when she finds out she'll get to have a girls' night in. Absent: Demetria McKinney as Janine and Keshia Knight Pulliam as Miranda
90	80	"How Do You Spell....It's All About Me?"	Tyler Perry	Christopher J. Moore	June 11, 2008	280
Malik assists Jazmine in her attempt to win a spelling bee and dethrone the reigning champion. Elsewhere, Curtis believes that Ella is having an affair. Absent: Allen Payne as C.J., Denise Burse as Claretha, Lance Gross as Calvin, Demetria McKinney as Janine and Keshia Knight Pulliam as Miranda
91	81	"And...Cut!"	Tyler Perry	Joseph Hampton	June 11, 2008	281
Ella tries to increase quality family time by fasting in which she forbids the family from using electronics for one week in the process a shocking secret is revealed about C.J. Elsewhere, a popular film actor begins frequenting the barbershop. Guest star: Jason Olive as Chad Absent: Denise Burse as Claretha, Demetria McKinney as Janine and Keshia Knight Pulliam as Miranda
92	82	"Old School vs. New School"	Tyler Perry	T. Smith, III, Joseph Hampton	June 18, 2008	282
It's Malik's birthday and he's being a brat about the kind of party and gifts he wants. Meanwhile, with Miranda's help, Calvin invests in the barbershop and becomes a partner. Absent: Denise Burse as Claretha, Demetria McKinney as Janine and Keshia Knight Pulliam as Miranda
93	83	"Fired and Desire"	Tyler Perry	Michelle L. Johnson	June 18, 2008	283
The entire household suffers along with Ella as she goes through menopause. Absent: Allen Payne as C.J., Demetria McKinney as Janine and Keshia Knight Pulliam as Miranda
94	84	"Unsung Heroes"	Tyler Perry	Steve Coulter, Dee Wagner	June 25, 2008	284
Calvin prepares to throw a party for a buddy who has returned home from Iraq. Elsewhere, Malik is assigned a school paper on a role model. Absent: Denise Burse as Claretha, Demetria McKinney as Janine and Keshia Knight Pulliam as Miranda
95	85	"Pissed, Poor and Paranoid"	Tyler Perry	Christopher J. Moore, Teri Jackson	June 25, 2008	285
Curtis puts Malik and Jazmine to work at the firehouse charity food drive so they can learn the art of money management. Elsewhere, C.J. tries to lose his female stalker; and the barbers find out that Delante has been living in the barbershop. Note: This was the final episode to feature the firehouse. Absent: Denise Burse as Claretha, Demetria McKinney as Janine and Keshia Knight Pulliam as Miranda
96	86	"True Lies"	Tyler Perry	Myra J.	July 2, 2008	286
Malik and Kevin decide to skip school to be with two girls. Meanwhile, Calvin's pal Peanut tries to impress the ladies by telling them he's a Payne family member and owns a barbershop. Absent: Denise Burse as Claretha, Demetria McKinney as Janine
97	87	"That Sounds Sweet"	Tyler Perry	Lamont Ferrell	July 2, 2008	287
Ella gets an idea for a new business after she sells a bunch of cakes and cookies; Malik takes up the saxophone to impress a girl. Absent: Lance Gross as Calvin, Demetria McKinney as Janine and Keshia Knight Pulliam as Miranda
98	88	"Meet the Lucases"	Tyler Perry	Joseph Hampton	July 9, 2008	288
The Paynes meet Miranda's family; in the middle of a heated discussion with Calvin, Curtis has a heart attack and collapses. Guest stars: Wendell Pierce as Jeffrey Lucas and Valarie Pettiford as Sandra Lucas Absent: Denise Burse as Claretha, China Anne McClain as Jazmine and Demetria McKinney as Janine
99	89	"Out on a Limb"	Tyler Perry	Christopher J. Moore	July 9, 2008	289
Ella, Claretha, Jazmine, and her friend set off on a camping trip and quickly become lost. Meanwhile, Calvin decides to propose to Miranda and sets out to find the perfect engagement ring. Absent: Allen Payne as C.J., Larramie "Doc" Shaw as Malik, Demetria McKinney as Janine and Keshia Knight Pulliam as Miranda
100	90	"Can't Buy Me Love"	Tyler Perry	Teri Jackson, Anita M. Cal	July 16, 2008	290
Calvin plans to propose to Miranda at a fancy restaurant but starts to question if he's rich enough to support her. Note: This is the 100th episode. Absent: Allen Payne as C.J., Denise Burse as Claretha, Larramie "Doc" Shaw as Malik, China Anne McClain as Jazmine and Demetria McKinney as Janine
101	91	"To Have and To Hold"	Tyler Perry	Steve Coulter, Dee Wagner, Teri Jackson	July 16, 2008	291
Calvin's newest attempt to propose to Miranda hits a snag when he misplaces the engagement ring; a secret romance blooms at the barbershop; Janine returns to tell C.J. that he is her baby's father. Note: This episode marks the return of Janine (Demetria McKinney). Note: The next 9 episodes are season-ending episodes as Janine goes through her pregnancy and Calvin and Miranda plan their wedding. They all happen in the Season 5 opener. Absent: Denise Burse as Claretha
102	92	"Unexpected Results"	Tyler Perry	Jenee V. Giles	July 23, 2008	292
Jazmine gets a perfect score on an aptitude test; C.J. and Tanya break up when he tells her he's the father of Janine's child. Guest star: Robin Givens as Tanya Absent: LaVan Davis as Curtis, Cassi Davis as Ella, Denise Burse as Claretha, Lance Gross as Calvin and Keshia Knight Pulliam as Miranda
103	93	"Let's Get Ready to Rumble"	Tyler Perry	Anita M. Cal, Lamont Ferrell	July 23, 2008	293
Curtis and Malik are left to chaperone Jazmine's slumber party when C.J. and Janine get held up at the barber shop. Absent: Cassi Davis as Ella, Denise Burse as Claretha and Keshia Knight Pulliam as Miranda
104	94	"Father's Day"	Tyler Perry	Steve Coulter, Dee Wagner	July 30, 2008	294
Grandpa Kelly comes to town; when he meets Miranda, he realizes he knew her in a past life. Meanwhile, the barbers befriend a homeless man who is searching for his son. Note: LaVan Davis has a dual role as Curtis and Grandpa Kelly. Absent: Allen Payne as C.J., Denise Burse as Claretha and Demetria McKinney as Janine
105	95	"Whose Wedding Is It Anyway?"	Tyler Perry	Teri Jackson	July 30, 2008	295
Ella accompanies Miranda to the mall to complete her wedding registry and ends up taking over; when C.J. and Janine decide to go out together, the kids hope their parents are reconciling. Absent: Denise Burse as Claretha
106	96	"All is Not Lost"	Tyler Perry	Kellie R. Griffin	July 30, 2008	296
Curtis has gained weight since his last tuxedo fitting; Calvin gets cold feet when his and Miranda's wedding plans start to go awry. Absent: Denise Burse as Claretha, Larramie "Doc" Shaw as Malik and China Anne McClain as Jazmine
107	97	"Party Over Here!"	Tyler Perry	Christopher J. Moore	August 6, 2008	297
Although Calvin promised Miranda that his bachelor party would be canceled, his family and friends go on with the celebration. Absent: Denise Burse as Claretha, Larramie "Doc" Shaw as Malik, China Anne McClain as Jazmine and Demetria McKinney as Janine
108	98	"The Last Supper"	Tyler Perry	Myra J.	August 6, 2008	298
Calvin and Miranda find themselves inundated with marital advice during their wedding rehearsal and dinner; the event may be ruined anyway by an unforeseen guest, drunken foolishness, and a fainting spell. Guest stars: Valarie Pettiford as Sandra Lucas, Wendell Pierce as Jeffrey Lucas and Marvin Winans as Pastor Richards Absent: Denise Burse as Claretha
109	99	"We've Come This Far by Faith: Part 1"	Tyler Perry	Jenee V. Giles, Kellie R. Griffin	August 6, 2008	299
Various issues threaten to ruin Calvin and Miranda's special day. One mighty complication: Miranda's father helps to deliver triplets. To be continued... Guest star: Valarie Pettiford as Sandra Lucas
110	100	"We've Come This Far by Faith: Part 2"	Tyler Perry	Kellie R. Griffin	August 6, 2008	2100
Numerous predicaments continue to plague Calvin and Miranda's big wedding day. One of those predicaments resulting in C.J. realizing he is still in love with Janine and repairing his family by proposing to her. At the end of the episode while giving the marriage vows, Janine goes into labor. Note: This episode marks the last appearance of Jazmine (China Anne McClain) until her return in the Season 4 episode "Recurring Paynes". Guest stars: Valarie Pettiford as Sandra Lucas, Wendell Pierce as Jeffrey Lucas and Marvin Winans as Pastor Richards

== Ratings ==
The first two episodes premiered with 5.2 and 5.8 million viewers.

== Home release ==
The season's first 20 episodes were released on the Volume 1 DVD on December 4, 2007. The season's final 17 episodes were released on the Volume 2 DVD on July 1, 2008.
