= Tyler Perry's House of Payne season 5 =

Tyler Perry's House of Payne
- Season 5
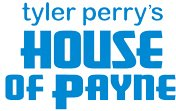
- No. of episodes: 40

Release
- Original network: TBS
- Original release: March 30, 2011 – January 13, 2012

Season chronology
- ← Previous; Season 4 Next → Season 6

The fifth season of Tyler Perry's House of Payne began airing on March 30, 2011, and ended on January 13, 2012. It stars LaVan Davis as Curtis Payne, Cassi Davis as Ella Payne, Allen Payne as CJ Payne, Lance Gross as Calvin Payne, Demetria McKinney as Janine Payne and Keshia Knight Pulliam as Miranda Payne.

Actress Denise Burse was reduced to a recurring role this season. Larramie "Doc" Shaw and China Anne McClain are featured in a low minimum number of episodes due to the shows they starred in Pair of Kings and A.N.T. Farm, respectively on Disney Channel and Disney XD.

On March 4, 2011, Tyler Perry's House of Payne won the 42nd NAACP Image Award for Outstanding Comedy Series. It won the award again the following year.

== Episodes ==
- LaVan Davis appeared in all the episodes.
- Cassi Davis was absent for four episodes.
- Allen Payne was absent for seven episodes.
- Demetria McKinney was absent for eight episodes.
- Keshia Knight Pulliam was absent for ten episodes.
- Lance Gross was absent for thirteen episodes.
- Larramie "Doc" Shaw was absent for thirty episodes.
- China Anne McClain was absent for thirty-four episodes.
- Denise Burse makes a guest appearance in four episodes.

No. overall	No. in season	Title	Directed by	Written by	Original release date	Prod. code
Part 1
183	1	"Payneful Resolution Resolution"	Tyler Perry	Brian Egeston, Tanya Hoffler-Moore and Angi Bones	March 30, 2011	501
C.J. and Janine deal with C.J. having kissed Monica. Meanwhile, Calvin gets out of jail and Miranda gives birth. Janine demands a divorce at the hospital in front of Calvin and Miranda after Malik confronts C.J. about kissing Monica. In the ending moments, Roland calls Janine into work; C.J. follows after her yelling, and Curtis and Ella observe, looking confused. Note: Starting with this episode Denise Burse is no longer credited as a main cast member, she now appears in a recurring role.
184	2	"Growing Paynes"	Tyler Perry	Aeysha Carr	March 30, 2011	502
Curtis and Ella have a weight-loss competition; Jazmine starts wearing makeup, hanging out with the wrong crowd, and having boys over when no adult is home; and C.J. and Janine reconcile when they see how their kids need them and how much they love each other. Note: This episode featured Cassi Davis telling viewers about losing 75 pounds during her time on House of Payne. Guest star: Jacob Latimore as Andre, Shamiek Moore as Dante, & Kia Jie Jacobs as Sandy Absent: Lance Gross as Calvin and Keshia Knight Pulliam as Miranda
185	3	"Payne Protection"	Tyler Perry	Don Woodard	April 6, 2011	503
All the Payne men help Malik prepare for college by offering advice and condoms, and in the season's funniest sequence, all the Payne women find out. Absent: China Anne McClain as Jazmine
186	4	"Payneful Visit"	Tyler Perry	Aeysha Carr	April 6, 2011	504
Claretha tells Ella and Curtis she has leukemia; Miranda's cousin-in-law/college-friend Vanessa hooks up with Calvin's friend. Guest star: Denise Burse as Claretha Absent: Allen Payne as C.J., Demetria McKinney as Janine, Larramie "Doc" Shaw as Malik and China Anne McClain as Jazmine
187	5	"Where There's a Will, There's a Way"	Chip Hurd	Beverly D. Hunter	April 13, 2011	505
After a young firefighter's death, Ella decides that it's time for her and Curtis to make their wills. Meanwhile, Miranda's mom hurts the baby during a visit. Absent: Larramie "Doc" Shaw as Malik and China Anne McClain as Jazmine
188	6	"Epic Fail"	Kim Fields	Tanya Hoffler-Moore & Kevin A. Garrett	April 13, 2011	506
Overwhelmed Ella falls behind in her studies due to church duties, household duties, and nurturing the family; when she fails a test she needs to graduate, she snaps on the family. Meanwhile, Calvin suddenly realizes that it's his anniversary and hurriedly buys some surprising gifts Absent: Demetria McKinney as Janine, Larramie "Doc" Shaw as Malik and China Anne McClain as Jazmine
189	7	"Praying for Attention"	Tyler Perry	Dani Reese	April 20, 2011	507
Jazmine prays to pass a test instead of applying herself; Calvin grows jealous of the baby.
190	8	"Shout Out"	Kim Fields	Tanya Hoffler-Moore	April 20, 2011	508
After attending marriage-counseling, C.J. and Janine try the therapist's way, but end up yelling and screaming at each other--and feeling better. They also get to the reason Janine would rather work than stay home. Meanwhile, Ella misses her graduation when she has to rush Claretha to the hospital. Guest Star: Denise Burse as Claretha Absent: Larramie "Doc" Shaw as Malik and China Anne McClain as Jazmine
191	9	"Love Thy Neighbor"	Chip Hurd	Beverly D. Hunter	April 27, 2011	509
The family befriends a reformed sex-offender who moves into the neighborhood and all hell breaks loose when they discover the truth, in spite of his good intentions. Meanwhile, on their marriage-counselor's advice, C.J. and Janine look for a hobby they can share. Absent: Larramie "Doc" Shaw as Malik, China Anne McClain as Jazmine, Lance Gross as Calvin and Keshia Knight Pulliam as Miranda
192	10	"Dream Girls"	Tyler Perry	Tanya Hoffler-Moore	April 27, 2011	510
A music producer wants to sign Jazmine; Calvin is embarrassed by his new grocery-store manager job. Guest Star: Heavy D as P-Rock
193	11	"A Payneful Night Out"	Chip Hurd	Kevin A. Garrett	May 4, 2011	511
Curtis and Ella believe that Janine and C.J. are cheating on each other: first they see Janine and Roland at dinner, then C.J. shows up with a woman. Meanwhile, Miranda goes on a grooming strike. Absent: Larramie "Doc" Shaw as Malik and China Anne McClain as Jazmine
194	12	"Payneful Assistance"	Chip Hurd	Tanya Hoffler-Moore	May 4, 2011	512
Miranda gets cooking advice after she makes a horrible dinner for Ella's club. Meanwhile, Curtis can't talk after his tonsillectomy, but manages to get Janine and C.J. to take care of him longer than they should. Absent: Lance Gross as Calvin, Larramie "Doc" Shaw as Malik and China Anne McClain as Jazmine
195	13	"House of Awkward"	Chip Hurd	Brian Egeston	May 11, 2011	513
C.J. is offered a promotion making him Janine and Roland's boss; Curtis finds a vintage bag of weed while packing and Floyd smokes it; when Calvin asks Curtis to babysit, he ends up tending Christian and Floyd. Absent: Larramie "Doc" Shaw as Malik, China Anne McClain as Jazmine and Keshia Knight Pulliam as Miranda
196	14	"Brain Payne"	Chip Hurd	Brian Egeston	May 11, 2011	514
Jayden may have autism and Janine blames herself. Meanwhile, Curtis lives by Bible rules when he believes God spoke to him. Absent: Lance Gross as Calvin, Larramie "Doc" Shaw as Malik, China Anne McClain as Jazmine and Keshia Knight Pulliam as Miranda
197	15	"Foster Paynes"	Kim Fields	Joseph Hampton	May 18, 2011	515
Ella brings troubled youth Deshawn (Bobb'e J. Thompson) home from the help center and Curtis brings out his true colors; Janine and Miranda's competition to get into an exclusive daycare gets ugly. Note: This was Bobb’e J. Thompson’s first appearance as Deshawn Absent: Allen Payne as C.J., Lance Gross as Calvin, Larramie "Doc" Shaw as Malik and China Anne McClain as Jazmine
198	16	"Talented Paynes"	Roger M. Bobb	Tanya Hoffler-Moore	May 18, 2011	516
Claretha secretly deals with the possibility of losing her home; the family participates in a talent show C.J. warned them against; after an argument with Curtis, Calvin and Miranda combine their unique talents for the show. Guest Star: Denise Burse as Claretha Absent: Larramie "Doc" Shaw as Malik and China Anne McClain as Jazmine
199	17	"Going, Going, Gone"	Kim Fields	Joseph Hampton	May 25, 2011	517
Janine is on the brink of a breakdown; Deshawn gets a lesson in the Negro Baseball League. Note: Beginning with this episode, the show aired one episode a week. Absent: Larramie "Doc" Shaw as Malik and China Anne McClain as Jazmine
200	18	"Mother's Day Out"	Roger M. Bobb	Myra J. & Robin M. Henry	June 1, 2011	518
Deshawn's mother shows up at the Paynes'; C.J. upgrades Janine's wedding ring. Absent: Lance Gross as Calvin, Larramie "Doc" Shaw as Malik, China Anne McClain as Jazmine and Keshia Knight Pulliam as Miranda Note: This is the 200th episode.
201	19	"So Hard To Say Goodbye"	Tyler Perry	David A. Arnold	June 8, 2011	519
Malik goes off to college; Miranda is overwhelmed when Calvin Jr. visits.
202	20	"Payneful Rescue"	Tyler Perry	Brian Egeston	June 15, 2011	520
The aftershocks of a fire impact Miranda and Calvin; Tracie and her new boyfriend show up at the hospital causing a huge argument. In the ending moments, the baby seems to be fine. Guest Star: Eva Marcille as Tracie Absent: Larramie "Doc" Shaw as Malik and China Anne McClain as Jazmine
Part 2
203	21	"A Mother's Payne"	Kim Fields	Brian Egeston	October 21, 2011	521
Ella's mother and sister Evie visit, and Ella experiences the effects of their mother's disease; Janine texts C.J. a sexy picture of herself. Note: Beginning with this episode, the show returned to regularly air 2 episodes a week on Fridays instead of Wednesdays. Guest-Stars: Aloma Wright as Eunice Williams and Janet Hubert-Whitten as Evie Absent: Lance Gross as Calvin, Larramie "Doc" Shaw as Malik and China Anne McClain as Jazmine
204	22	"Up From the Ashes"	Kim Fields	Aeysha Carr	October 21, 2011	522
Calvin finds out that Tracie checked Calvin Jr. out of the hospital. Calvin and Miranda try to find a place to stay. Absent: Larramie "Doc" Shaw as Malik and China Anne McClain as Jazmine
205	23	"The Payne Gang"	Roger M. Bobb	Kevin A. Garnett	October 28, 2011	523
Curtis, Ella, and Floyd try to bring DeShawn a reality check when he wants to join a gang. C.J. and Calvin tussle over their living arrangements. Absent: Larramie "Doc" Shaw as Malik, China Anne McClain as Jazmine, Demetria McKinney as Janine and Keshia Knight Pulliam as Miranda
206	24	"The Gifted and the Grout"	Kim Fields	Kevin A. Garnett	October 28, 2011	524
DeShawn is placed in a gifted-students program to avoid being expelled from school; Calvin and Miranda hire a contractor to repair their condo. Absent: Allen Payne as C.J., Larramie "Doc" Shaw as Malik, China Anne McClain as Jazmine and Demetria McKinney as Janine
207	25	"Do the Fight Thing"	Kim Fields	Tanya Hoffler-Moore	November 4, 2011	525
DeShawn bullies a classmate and lands himself in serious trouble; Miranda and Janine fight over petty things. Note: This episode featured Bobb'e J. Thompson talking to viewers about bullying. Absent: Allen Payne as C.J., Lance Gross as Calvin, Larramie "Doc" Shaw as Malik, and China Anne McClain as Jazmine
208	26	"1096"	Kim Fields	Aeysha Carr	November 4, 2011	526
C.J. forgets Janine's 3-years-sober anniversary; Ella gets DeShawn an ugly outfit for school-picture day. Absent: Lance Gross as Calvin, Larramie "Doc" Shaw as Malik and China Anne McClain as Jazmine
209	27	"Number Five's Fight"	Chip Hurd	Brian Egeston	November 11, 2011	527
C.J closes a fire station due to budget cuts, and Curtis disapproves of it. Calvin and Miranda want to move upstairs. Absent: Larramie "Doc" Shaw as Malik and China Anne McClain as Jazmine
210	28	"The Best Surprise"	Chip Hurd	Joseph Hampton	November 11, 2011	528
Calvin and Miranda plan Calvin Jr.'s birthday party; Curtis and Ella have trouble with the Homeowners Association. Guest Star: Corey Holcomb as Damon Absent: Allen Payne as C.J., Larramie "Doc" Shaw as Malik and China Anne McClain as Jazmine
211	29	"Working Paynes"	Chip Hurd	Adrianne Carter	November 18, 2011	529
C.J. hires Calvin, whose performance is disappointing. Meanwhile, Curtis tries painting Absent: Larramie "Doc" Shaw as Malik and China Anne McClain as Jazmine
212	30	"Curtis Jefferson"	Tyler Perry	Joseph Hampton & Brian Egeston	November 18, 2011	530
Curtis wakes up as a Jefferson. Note: This was the first of several episodes where Demetria McKinney is credited as Demetria "Dee Dee" McKinney. Special Guest Stars: Sherman Hemsley as George Jefferson and Marla Gibbs as Florence Absent: Larramie "Doc" Shaw as Malik and China Anne McClain as Jazmine
213	31	"Dead Wrong"	Kim Fields	Myra J.	November 25, 2011	531
Miranda frets over her unemployment; C.J. looks into firefighter response times. Absent: Cassi Davis as Ella, Larramie "Doc" Shaw as Malik and China Anne McClain as Jazmine
214	32	"The Rich and Payneless"	Kim Fields	Tanya Hoffler-Moore	November 25, 2011	532
Calvin is allowed supervised visits; Ella's friend Felicia visits. Guest Stars: Corey Holcomb as Damon and Sheryl Lee Ralph as Felicia Starr Absent: Allen Payne as C.J., Demetria McKinney as Janine, Larramie "Doc" Shaw as Malik and China Anne McClain as Jazmine
215	33	"Mentoring Paynes"	Kim Fields	Joseph Hampton	December 2, 2011	533
Janine sponsors a young girl; Curtis and Ella become DeShawn's foster parents. Absent: Larramie "Doc" Shaw as Malik and China Anne McClain as Jazmine
216	34	"Roommate Paynes"	Chip Hurd	David A. Arnold	December 2, 2011	534
C.J. and Janine are not comfortable with Malik's roommate; Claretha tries alternative cancer-fighting treatments. Guest Star: Denise Burse as Claretha Note: This was Denise Burse's final appearance as Claretha. Absent: Lance Gross as Calvin, China Anne McClain as Jazmine and Keshia Knight Pulliam as Miranda
217	35	"Pledging Paynes"	Chip Hurd	Brian Egeston	December 30, 2011	535
Malik gets hazed. Absent: Cassi Davis as Ella, Lance Gross as Calvin, China Anne McClain as Jazmine, Demetria McKinney as Janine and Keshia Knight Pulliam as Miranda
218	36	"Help Me, Ella"	Chip Hurd	Anthony C. Hill	December 30, 2011	536
Ella becomes director of the center; Malik mulls dropping out. Absent: Lance Gross as Calvin, China Anne McClain as Jazmine and Keshia Knight Pulliam as Miranda
229	37	"Paynefully Fit"	Tyler Perry	Tanya Hoffler-Moore	January 6, 2012	537
Curtis becomes a contestant on Paynefully Fit, while Deshawn get advice about girls. Absent: Demetria McKinney as Janine, Lance Gross as Calvin, Keshia Knight Pulliam as Miranda, Larramie "Doc" Shaw as Malik and China Anne McClain as Jazmine Guest Star: Shaun T as himself
220	38	"Do the Hustle"	Tyler Perry	Beverly D. Hunter	January 6, 2012	538
Miranda's new client flirts with her while the family honors Curtis. Note: Demetria McKinney is credited as Demetria "Dee Dee" McKinney. Absent: Larramie "Doc" Shaw as Malik and China Anne McClain as Jazmine Guest Stars: Troy Winbush as Travis Harris
221	39	"No More Payne"	Tyler Perry	Joseph Hampton	January 13, 2012	539
Miranda takes over renovating the condo while Calvin and Deshawn bond. Absent: Allen Payne as C.J., Demetria McKinney as Janine, Larramie "Doc" Shaw as Malik and China Anne McClain as Jazmine
222	40	"God Bless the Paynes"	Tyler Perry	Joseph Hampton & Brian Egeston	January 13, 2012	540
The Payne's say goodbye while praising God in church. Guest Stars: Troy Winbush as Travis Harris Note: This is part 1 out of two. This is the second altercation between Calvin and Travis Harris.
