= Tyler Perry's House of Payne season 3 =

Tyler Perry's House of Payne
- Season 3
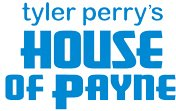
- No. of episodes: 26

Release
- Original network: TBS
- Original release: December 3, 2008 – June 3, 2009

Season chronology
- ← Previous; Season 2 Next → Season 4

The third season of Tyler Perry's House of Payne began airing on December 3, 2008, and concluded on June 3, 2009. It stars Keshia Knight Pulliam as Miranda, Cassi Davis as Ella Payne, LaVan Davis as Curtis Payne, Allen Payne as CJ Payne, Lance Gross as Calvin Payne, Demetria McKinney as Janine Payne, and Larramie "Doc" Shaw as Malik Payne. This season consists of 26 episodes. All episodes of this season of House of Payne were recorded in front of a live studio audience.

Actress China Anne McClain is not a cast member this season and Denise Burse leaves the show after the fourth episode "Casa De Payne".

== Episodes ==
No. overall	No. in season	Title	Directed by	Written by	Original release date	Prod. code
111	1	"Labor Paynes: Part 1"	Tyler Perry	Brandon Broussard	December 3, 2008	301
Janine goes into labor as a double wedding uniting C.J. and Janine, and Calvin and Miranda, swiftly changes locations to the hospital. To be continued... Guest stars: Valarie Pettiford as Sandra Lucas, Wendell Pierce as Jeffrey Lucas and Marvin Winans as Pastor Richards Absent: Denise Burse as Claretha
112	2	"Labor Paynes: Part 2"	Tyler Perry	Teri Jackson	December 3, 2008	302
Since bringing the twins home and with little help from anyone, Janine struggles to keep the newborns settled at the same time and as a result, she goes through postpartum depression Absent: Denise Burse as Claretha, Lance Gross as Calvin and Keshia Knight Pulliam as Miranda
113	3	"Your Wife's a Payne"	Tyler Perry	Kellie R. Griffin	December 10, 2008	303
Calvin and Miranda move into their new digs, but Miranda's shadowy con-artist past insists on threatening to ruin the present. Also, the couple quarrel over business plans at the barbershop. Absent: Allen Payne as C.J., LaVan Davis as Curtis, Cassi Davis as Ella, Denise Burse as Claretha, Larramie "Doc" Shaw as Malik and Demetria McKinney as Janine
114	4	"Casa De Payne"	Tyler Perry	Steve Coulter	December 10, 2008	304
Claretha becomes engaged to an African prince; planning a move to Africa, she sells her house to the Hernandezes. Meanwhile, Curtis blows a gasket when he receives a slew of parking tickets. Guest star: Denise Burse as Claretha Note: This episode marks the last appearance of Claretha (Denise Burse) until her return in the Season 4 premiere episode "Where's the Payne?" and she is credited as a guest-star.
115	5	"It's a Payne Growing Up"	Tyler Perry	Tajamika Paxton and Calvin Brown, Jr.	December 17, 2008	305
Malik's best friend Kevin gets intimate with a promiscuous girl who happens to be the source of a syphilis outbreak at their school. Malik subsequently seeks counsel from C.J., which leads to a misunderstanding. Meanwhile, Miranda pressures Calvin to be a more thoughtful husband when communication between them lapses. Note: This episode featured Larramie "Doc" Shaw telling viewers about sexually transmitted diseases.
116	6	"Payne and Prejudice"	Tyler Perry	Steve Coulter	December 17, 2008	306
The Paynes have dinner at the Hernandez home; at the barbershop, Dana's falsehoods catch up with her, when her parents pay her a visit. Guest star: Tracey Ross as Mrs. Carter Absent: Allen Payne as C.J., Lance Gross as Calvin, Demetria McKinney as Janine and Keshia Knight Pulliam as Miranda
107	7	"Payneful News"	Tyler Perry	Joseph Hampton and Lamont Ferrell	February 11, 2009	307
When Miranda and Calvin have trouble conceiving, they consult a doctor whose orders leave Calvin overly fatigued. Meanwhile, Malik is hired to run errands at the barbershop, but he settles on cutting a customer's hair.
118	8	"Payneful Loss"	Tyler Perry	Christopher J. Moore and Kelly Zimmerman-Green	February 11, 2009	308
Striving to lose weight, Ella enters a health-and-wellness ranch---with Curtis in tow. They meet Ella's erstwhile trainer, Francois. Absent: Allen Payne as C.J. and Demetria McKinney as Janine
119	9	"Payneful Employment"	Tyler Perry	Joseph Hampton	February 18, 2009	309
C.J. interviews for a fire-chief post in New Jersey, and Curtis is elated that the younger Paynes might finally move out. At the barbershop, Kiki tries to persuade Floyd to hire her brother---who was just released from prison. Absent: Lance Gross as Calvin, Larramie "Doc" Shaw as Malik and Keshia Knight Pulliam as Miranda
120	10	"Slightly Payneful Truth"	Tyler Perry	Christopher J. Moore and Calvin Brown, Jr.	February 18, 2009	310
Alexandra discloses that Consuela needs her citizenship and enlists Malik for help. Elsewhere, Dana and Kiki eye a handsome new stylist at the barbershop. Absent: Allen Payne as C.J., Demetria McKinney as Janine, Cassi Davis as Ella, Lance Gross as Calvin and Keshia Knight Pulliam as Miranda
121	11	"Joy and Payne"	Tyler Perry	Joseph Hampton	February 25, 2009	311
The eldest Hernandez son returns home from Iraq; Floyd's extensive casino time brings him trouble. Absent: Allen Payne as C.J., Demetria McKinney as Janine, Cassi Davis as Ella, Larramie "Doc" Shaw as Malik and Keshia Knight Pulliam as Miranda
122	12	"A Sister's Payne"	Tyler Perry	Brandon Broussard and Christopher J. Moore	February 25, 2009	312
Kiki's brother Darnell tries to put his drug-dealer life behind him; he stands tall to protect his sister when her ex-flame stirs up trouble. Meanwhile, Malik's romantic interest in Alexandra advances to the next level when they go out on a date. Note: This episode featured Lance Gross telling viewers about the importance of witnesses coming forward with information. Absent: Allen Payne as C.J., Cassi Davis as Ella, Demetria McKinney as Janine and Keshia Knight Pulliam as Miranda
123	13	"A Grand Payne"	Tyler Perry	Brandon Broussard and Joseph Hampton	March 4, 2009	313
Malik and Alexandra agree to go on a date; when their parents insist that they need supervision, Calvin and Mercedes are enlisted as their chaperones. Meanwhile, Janine's parents visit, promptly taxing Janine's relationship with her mother. Guest stars: Anne-Marie Johnson as Liz Shelton and Dorian Harewood as Larry Shelton Absent: Keshia Knight Pulliam as Miranda
124	14	"Games People Play"	Tyler Perry	Joseph Hampton	March 4, 2009	314
The Paynes relish their annual tailgating shindig, but Miranda falls ill after hearing of Calvin and Mercedes' "date." Meanwhile, an increasingly agitated Diego starts all kinds of fights. Note: This episode marks the last appearance of C.J. (Allen Payne) until his return in the Season 4 episode "Recurring Paynes". Absent: Demetria McKinney as Janine
125	15	"Help Wanted"	Tyler Perry	Steve Coulter & Dani Renee	April 8, 2009	315
Still reeling from Calvin's kiss with Mercedes, Miranda heads out on her own and runs into her successful, good-looking ex-fiance; this gets Calvin's attention and he takes a job at Mercedes' company to show that he's doing something with his life. Guest star: Boris Kodjoe as David Absent: Allen Payne as C.J., Larramie "Doc" Shaw as Malik and Demetria McKinney as Janine
126	16	"Old Lady Paynes"	Tyler Perry	Lamont Ferrell	April 8, 2009	316
Ella's demanding mother arrives but exhibits lapses of memory that alert Ella that she might have Alzheimer's disease. Meanwhile, Floyd's supposedly dead first wife materializes at the barbershop. Guest star: Aloma Wright as Eunice Williams Absent: Allen Payne as C.J., Lance Gross as Calvin and Keshia Knight Pulliam as Miranda
127	17	"I Don't Know This Payne"	Tyler Perry	Tricia Johnson and Myra J.	April 15, 2009	317
Ella and Rosie seek independence and financial strength by applying for jobs at a mall boutique; Curtis and Carlos bond during their manly free time--until they begin missing their wives. Absent: Allen Payne as C.J., Lance Gross as Calvin, Larramie "Doc" Shaw as Malik, Demetria McKinney as Janine and Keshia Knight Pulliam as Miranda
128	18	"Pall Mall"	Tyler Perry	Steve Coulter	April 15, 2009	318
Ella meets a handsome, charming man at the mall; Diego enlists Calvin and Miranda to scrutinize Mercedes' new beau. Absent: Allen Payne as C.J., Larramie "Doc" Shaw as Malik and Demetria McKinney as Janine
129	19	"With Friends Like These"	Tyler Perry	Dani Renee	April 22, 2009	319
Malik befriends an HIV-positive classmate who is a target of classroom abuse; Consuela oversees the boutique when Rosie calls in sick. Note: This episode featured Larramie "Doc" Shaw and JT Knight telling viewers about HIV and AIDS. Absent: Allen Payne as C.J., LaVan Davis as Curtis, Lance Gross as Calvin and Keshia Knight Pulliam as Miranda
130	20	"The Talent Show"	Tyler Perry	Myra J. and Kelly Zimmerman-Green	April 22, 2009	320
The firehouse's very existence is jeopardized by city budget cuts, but a big fundraising talent show could save the day. R&B vocalist Gladys Knight appears as herself. Guest star: Gladys Knight Absent: Allen Payne as C.J. and Keshia Knight Pulliam as Miranda
131	21	"Bringing Down the House"	Tyler Perry	Joseph Hampton	April 29, 2009	321
The Payne home foundation urgently needs repairs, but Curtis' cost-cutting approach backfires; Ella inches closer to the charmer (Michael Genet) she met at the mall. Absent: Allen Payne as C.J., Lance Gross as Calvin, Larramie "Doc" Shaw as Malik, Demetria McKinney as Janine and Keshia Knight Pulliam as Miranda
132	22	"Moving Day"	Tyler Perry	Calvin Brown Jr.	April 29, 2009	322
Curtis, Ella, and Malik must relocate to Calvin and Miranda's after slipshod repairs on their house leave them homeless; Floyd's beautiful daughter arrives at the barbershop. Absent: Allen Payne as C.J. and Demetria McKinney as Janine
133	23	"Moving Out"	Tyler Perry	Kelly Zimmerman-Green	May 27, 2009	323
Miranda fumes over Calvin's escapades with Mercedes and his decision to let his family stay with them; Curtis and Ella quarrel over Ella's job. Absent: Allen Payne as C.J., Larramie "Doc" Shaw as Malik and Demetria McKinney as Janine
134	24	"Back Where We Belong"	Tyler Perry	Myra J.	May 27, 2009	324
With their respective marriages on the rocks, Curtis and Calvin move into the barbershop; meanwhile, Floyd finds out about Zack and Olivia. Note: This was the final episode to feature the barbershop. Absent: Allen Payne as C.J. and Demetria McKinney as Janine
135	25	"Surprise!: Part 1"	Tyler Perry	Gary Sturgis	June 3, 2009	325
Calvin runs into an ex-flame and her newborn--Calvin Jr.--just as Miranda discovers that she's pregnant. Meanwhile, Janine alerts the family that C.J. is after a new job that would take him and the family to Chicago, but Malik isn't thrilled. To be continued... Guest star: Eva Marcille as Tracie Absent: Allen Payne as C.J.
136	26	"Surprise!: Part 2"	Tyler Perry	Joseph Hampton & Steve Coulter	June 3, 2009	326
Calvin mediates a meeting involving Miranda, Tracie and Mercedes; Janine and the twins prepare to relocate to Chicago, where Malik would need to repeat his freshman year. Guest star: Eva Marcille as Tracie Note: Malik makes his final beginning with this episode. Absent: Allen Payne as C.J.
