= Tyler Perry's House of Payne season 1 =

Tyler Perry's House of Payne
- Season 1
- No. of episodes: 10

Release
- Original network: Syndcation
- Original release: June 21 – July 19, 2006

Season chronology
- Next → Season 2

The first season of the Tyler Perry's House of Payne began on TBS in June 21, 2006, and concluded on July 19, 2006. The season contained 10 episodes. Although this is the first season of the series, a set of 10 test episodes aired in the summer of 2006 in syndications.

The series debut in 2006 had 5.2 million viewers, setting a cable channel record at the time.

== Cast ==
- Allen Payne as Clarence James (C.J.) Payne Jr.
- LaVan Davis as Curtis Payne
- Cassi Davis as Ella Payne
- Larramie "Doc" Shaw as Malik Payne
- China Anne McClain as Jazmine Payne
- Demetria McKinney as Janine Payne
- Denise Burse as Claretha Jenkins

== Episodes ==
No. overall	No. in season	Title	Original release date	Prod. code
1	1	"The Roof is On Fire"	June 21, 2006	101
C.J. Payne and his wife, Janine, are happily married with two children and live in a nice home. When their house catches on fire, they are forced to move in under the roof of C.J.'s parents, Curtis and Ella, and no one is happy with the present situation.
2	2	"When the Smoke Clears Out"	June 21, 2006	102
C.J. and Janine's relationship starts to get worse when C.J. finds out that Janine hasn't been paying the bills for their house. Meanwhile, Curtis and Malik start bonding after the television system blows up.
3	3	"The Invasion (Part 1)"	June 28, 2006	103
Curtis has problems with Malik's new outfit and C.J.'s current living condition puts him in a bad mood. To be continued...
4	4	"Take It Or Leave It (The Invasion: Part 2)"	June 28, 2006	104
C.J. is attracted to Malik's math teacher, Miss Nicole Jamieson (Rochelle Aytes). Meanwhile, Ella has to tell Claretha some bad news about her involvement with the church.
5	5	"Home Alone"	July 5, 2006	105
C.J. is left home in the house with his kids and Claretha while Curtis and Ella go out of town for the weekend. To be continued...
6	6	"I've Got the Hook Up (Home Alone: Part 2)"	July 5, 2006	106
C.J. tries to get back in the dating scene, but his efforts are thwarted as Pops and Claretha follow him during his date with Claretha's daughter, Huretha. Meanwhile, Curtis tries to have his monthly poker game while babysitting his grandchildren at the same time.
7	7	"Ella's War"	July 12, 2006	107
While Curtis is away, Ella gets a visit from Janine who asks Ella to help her get her life together. Things get serious between C.J. and Malik's math teacher.
8	8	"No Place Like Home"	July 12, 2006	108
After finishing her stay in rehab, Janine asks Ella if she could move back in.
9	9	"Divided We Fall"	July 19, 2006	109
When Ella gets sick, Curtis takes on more responsibilities. C.J. struggles to adapt to living with Janine again.
10	10	"Big Baller, Shot Caller"	July 19, 2006	110
While C.J. is less than inclined to meet Janine's new boyfriend (Michael Jai White), Curtis studies painting.
