= The Paynes =

American comedy television series

- Created by: Tyler Perry
- Written by: Tyler Perry
- Directed by: Tyler Perry; Mark E. Swinton
- Starring: LaVan Davis; Cassi Davis; Stephanie Charles; Markice Moore; JD McCrary; Sanai Victoria; Anthony O. Dalton; Matthew Law; Jackée Harry
- Country of origin: United States
- Original language: English
- No. of seasons: 1
- No. of episodes: 38

Production
- Executive producer: Tyler Perry
- Camera setup: Multiple
- Running time: 21 minutes
- Production company: Tyler Perry Studios

Original release
- Network: Oprah Winfrey Network
- Release: January 16 – November 30, 2018

Related
- House of Payne

The Paynes is an American television sitcom that premiered on January 16, 2018, on the Oprah Winfrey Network. The show was created, written, and directed by Tyler Perry and serves as a sequel to his previous series, Tyler Perry's House of Payne.

Though the show was not renewed for a second season, a revival of the original series premiered in 2020 on BET.

== Plot ==
The series begins in Sun Coast, Florida, where Curtis and Ella Payne come to attend the funeral of Curtis' Uncle Robert. Their trip takes an unexpected turn when Ella and Curtis get roped into a real estate deal, landing them in a new community with a new church and unfamiliar family members. The family land straight back into the issues they find in their everyday lives. As life lessons abound, Ella finds a new business, a new home, and a new purpose. On House of Payne, Season 7, Episode 14 "Been A Long Time", this series is officially retconned out of existence as it is revealed that it was all a dream that Curtis had.

== Cast and characters ==
=== Main ===
- LaVan Davis as Curtis Payne, Ella's husband and JoAnn's cousin. Without consulting his wife, Curtis sells his old house and buys his late uncle's house and laundromat at his cousin's suggestion, only to find both in ruins.
- Cassi Davis as Ella Payne, Curtis' wife. While Ella is furious at her husband for not consulting her, she soon comes to enjoy the effect of the move and lets her anger go to make a new start.
- Jackée Harry as JoAnn Payne, Curtis' cousin and Ryan's mother, who tricked him into buying his late uncle's dilapidated home as well as a broken-down laundromat in order to make profits for her church.
- Stephanie Charles as Nyla, Kenny and Lynn's mother. A young woman who works with JoAnn at the church. She begins to live with Curtis and Ella after they encounter her in an abusive relationship with her boyfriend Kendrick. She has two young kids, Kenny and Lynn.
- Markice Moore as Ryan Payne, JoAnn's son and Curtis's nephew. He works at the laundromat and was amused when his relatives bought the dump. He often butts heads with Curtis, but comes to see him as family and reaches common ground with him.
- JD McCrary as Kenny, Nyla's son
- Sanai Victoria as Lynn, Nyla's daughter
- Anthony O. Dalton as Terrance, the head contractor whom Ella hires to repair the laundromat
- Matthew Law as Kendrick, Nyla's abusive boyfriend

=== Guest ===
- Lance Gross as Calvin Payne, Curtis and Ella's only son
- Allen Payne as Clarence "CJ" Payne Jr., Curtis and Ella's nephew
- Demetria McKinney as Janine Payne, C.J.'s wife
- Larramie "Doc" Shaw as Malik Payne, C.J. and Janine's son
- China Anne McClain as Jazmine Payne, C.J. and Janine's daughter
- Anthony Reynolds as Agent Simms
- Polly W. LePorte as Margaret Davis
- Monique Grant as Homeless Woman

== Episodes ==
No.	Title	Directed by	Written by	Original release date	Prod. code
Part 1
1	"A Surprise for the Paynes"	Tyler Perry	Tyler Perry	January 16, 2018	101
Special guest stars: Lance Gross as Calvin, Allen Payne as CJ, Demetria McKinney as Janine, Larramie "Doc" Shaw as Malik and China Anne McClain as Jazmine
2	"Revelations of Payne"	Tyler Perry	Tyler Perry	January 16, 2018	102
Special guest stars: Lance Gross as Calvin, Allen Payne as CJ, Demetria McKinney as Janine, Larramie "Doc" Shaw as Malik and China Anne McClain as Jazmine
3	"A Confrontation of Payne"	Tyler Perry	Tyler Perry	January 19, 2018	103
Special guest stars: Lance Gross as Calvin, Allen Payne as CJ, Demetria McKinney as Janine, Larramie "Doc" Shaw as Malik and China Anne McClain as Jazmine
4	"Cleaning Up the Payne"	Tyler Perry	Tyler Perry	January 26, 2018	104
5	"A Fugitive in Payne"	Tyler Perry	Tyler Perry	February 2, 2018	105
6	"The Waiting Game"	Tyler Perry	Tyler Perry	February 9, 2018	106
7	"Better Than Nothing"	Mark E. Swinton	Tyler Perry	February 16, 2018	107
8	"A Payneful Night"	Tyler Perry	Tyler Perry	February 23, 2018	108
9	"The World Wide Payne"	Mark E. Swinton	Tyler Perry	March 2, 2018	109
10	"Lynn's Punishment"	Mark E. Swinton	Tyler Perry	March 9, 2018	110
11	"Making Repairs"	Mark E. Swinton	Tyler Perry	March 16, 2018	111
12	"Payneful Repairs"	Tyler Perry	Tyler Perry	March 23, 2018	112
13	"A Payneful Dispute"	Tyler Perry	Tyler Perry	March 30, 2018	113
14	"A Payneful Cry"	Tyler Perry	Tyler Perry	April 6, 2018	114
15	"Keep the Payne Away"	Tyler Perry	Tyler Perry	April 13, 2018	115
16	"Date Night"	Tyler Perry	Tyler Perry	April 20, 2018	116
17	"Secret Lovers"	Tyler Perry	Tyler Perry	April 27, 2018	117
18	"Making Her Honest"	Tyler Perry	Tyler Perry	May 4, 2018	118
Part 2
19	"A Payneful Bounce"	Tyler Perry	Tyler Perry	July 20, 2018	119
Guest starring: Anthony Reynolds as Agent Simms and Lolly W. PePorte as Margaret Davis
20	"A Payne Family Secret"	Tyler Perry	Tyler Perry	July 27, 2018	120
Guest starring: Anthony Reynolds as Agent Simms and Lolly W. PePorte as Margaret Davis
21	"Payneful Situations"	Tyler Perry	Tyler Perry	August 3, 2018	121
22	"Home Alone"	Tyler Perry	Tyler Perry	August 10, 2018	122
23	"Girl Talk"	Tyler Perry	Tyler Perry	August 17, 2018	123
24	"The Outsiders"	Tyler Perry	Tyler Perry	August 24, 2018	124
25	"An Impasse"	Tyler Perry	Tyler Perry	August 31, 2018	125
26	"No Room for Payne"	Tyler Perry	Tyler Perry	September 7, 2018	126
27	"No Sticks or Bricks"	Tyler Perry	Tyler Perry	September 14, 2018	127
28	"A Payneful Hunch"	Tyler Perry	Tyler Perry	September 21, 2018	128
29	"Syncopal"	Tyler Perry	Tyler Perry	September 28, 2018	129
30	"A Payneful Confrontation"	Tyler Perry	Tyler Perry	October 5, 2018	130
31	"Hostile"	Tyler Perry	Tyler Perry	October 12, 2018	131
32	"Payneful Business"	Tyler Perry	Tyler Perry	October 19, 2018	132
33	"A Conundrum"	Tyler Perry	Tyler Perry	October 26, 2018	133
34	"A Payneful Proposition"	Tyler Perry	Tyler Perry	November 2, 2018	134
35	"Payneful Partnership"	Tyler Perry	Tyler Perry	November 9, 2018	135
36	"Social Media'd"	Tyler Perry	Tyler Perry	November 16, 2018	136
37	"A Giraffe and a Bull"	Tyler Perry	Tyler Perry	November 23, 2018	137
38	"Payneful Choices"	Tyler Perry	Tyler Perry	November 30, 2018	138
