= San Junipero =

- Black Mirror episode
- Yorkie (Mackenzie Davis, left) and Kelly (Gugu Mbatha-Raw, right)
- Episode no.: Series 3 Episode 4
- Directed by: Owen Harris
- Written by: Charlie Brooker
- Cinematography by: Gustav Danielsson
- Editing by: Nicolas Chaudeurge
- Original release date: 21 October 2016
- Running time: 61 minutes

Guest appearances
- Gugu Mbatha-Raw as Kelly; Mackenzie Davis as Yorkie; Denise Burse as elder Kelly; Raymond McAnally as Greg; Gavin Stenhouse as Wes; Annabel Davis as elder Yorkie

Episode chronology
| ← Previous "Shut Up and Dance" | Next → "Men Against Fire" |

"San Junipero" is the fourth episode in the third series of the British science fiction anthology television series Black Mirror. Written by series creator and showrunner Charlie Brooker and directed by Owen Harris, it premiered on Netflix on 21 October 2016, with the rest of series three.

The episode is set in a beach resort town named San Junipero, where the introverted Yorkie (Mackenzie Davis) meets the more outgoing Kelly (Gugu Mbatha-Raw). The town is part of a simulated reality the elderly can inhabit, even after death. "San Junipero" was the first episode written for the third series. Initial drafts were based on nostalgia therapy and designed as a 1980s period piece. The first script was about a heterosexual couple and had an unhappy ending, while the final version focuses on a sapphic couple and has an optimistic ending, atypical of Black Mirror. Filming took place in London and Cape Town across several weeks. The soundtrack interweaves 1980s songs with an original score by Clint Mansell.

The episode received critical acclaim, with particular praise for Mbatha-Raw's and Davis's performances, its plot twist, visual style, and its unusual uplifting tone. It received higher critical ratings than the show's other episodes, while some critics considered it one of the best television episodes of 2016. In addition to several other accolades, "San Junipero" won two Primetime Emmy Awards for Outstanding Television Movie and Outstanding Writing for a Limited Series, Movie, or Dramatic Special.

== Plot ==
In 1987, a shy young woman named Yorkie (Mackenzie Davis) visits the nightclub Tucker's in San Junipero. Kelly (Gugu Mbatha-Raw), a vivacious party girl, rebuffs the advances of Wes (Gavin Stenhouse) to talk to Yorkie. Kelly and Yorkie dance, but Yorkie becomes uncomfortable and leaves the club. Kelly follows and sexually propositions Yorkie, who declines, saying she is engaged. The following week, Yorkie returns to the bar and observes Kelly flirting with a man. Yorkie and Kelly reunite in the bathroom, kiss there, and later have sex at Kelly's beach house. Yorkie confesses that it was her first time having sex, and Kelly reveals that she was once married.

The next week, Yorkie visits another nightclub, the BDSM-themed Quagmire, looking for Kelly. Wes advises her to "try a different time". Yorkie visits Tucker's in a few different decades until she finds Kelly in 2002, but Kelly rejects her. After Yorkie leaves, Kelly follows and confesses she is dying; Kelly had avoided Yorkie because she feared developing feelings for her. The two have sex again, and Yorkie reluctantly tells Kelly she lives in Santa Rosa, California, so they can meet.

San Junipero is revealed to be a simulated reality where the deceased can live, and the elderly can visit, all inhabiting their younger selves' bodies in a time of their choice. In the physical world, the elderly Kelly (Denise Burse) visits Yorkie (Annabel Davis). She learns from Yorkie's nurse Greg (Raymond McAnally) that Yorkie was paralysed at age 21 after crashing her car when her parents reacted negatively to her coming out, and has been in a coma for 40 years. Yorkie wishes to be euthanised to live in San Junipero permanently, but her family objects; she intends to marry Greg so that he can consent for her. Kelly offers to marry Yorkie instead, and after she enthusiastically accepts, Kelly authorises Yorkie's euthanasia.

During Kelly's next visit to San Junipero, Yorkie asks her to stay full-time. Kelly says she plans to die without being uploaded to the simulation; her husband chose the same fate because their daughter died before San Junipero existed. Yorkie and Kelly argue, and Kelly leaves in her car, which she intentionally crashes. Yorkie catches up to her just as Kelly disappears, her visiting time over for the week.

Time passes and Kelly decides she is ready to enter San Junipero permanently. She is euthanised and buried alongside her family, and she happily reunites with Yorkie in San Junipero.

== Production ==
"San Junipero" is the fourth episode of series three of Black Mirror; all six episodes in this series were simultaneously released on Netflix on 21 October 2016. Whilst series one and two of Black Mirror were shown on Channel 4 in the UK, Netflix commissioned the series for 12 episodes (split into two series of six episodes) in September 2015 with a bid of $40 million, and in March 2016, Netflix outbid Channel 4 for the right to distribute series three in the UK. Due to its move to Netflix, the show had a larger budget than in previous series, and a larger episode order which allowed the show to vary its genre and tone more than previous series. Alongside series three episode "Nosedive", "San Junipero" was first shown in 2016 ahead of its Netflix release at the Toronto International Film Festival.

=== Conception and writing ===
I'd read people saying, 'Oh no! It's going to get all American!' so I said, fuck it, I'm going to set it in California, fuck you, I'll choose protagonists that wouldn't necessarily leap into my head, and I'll explore a hopeful use of technology to shut up people who think it's written by the Unabomber.

— Charlie Brooker, interview with The Daily Beast.

"San Junipero" was the first script produced for series three, written by Charlie Brooker as a "conscious decision to change the series". The show previously focused on technology's negative effects; this episode served as proof that uplifting Black Mirror episodes are possible.

Brooker initially envisioned an episode in which technology is used to investigate whether an afterlife exists, thinking of the genres of horror and supernatural fiction. He later became inspired by nostalgia therapy, wherein elderly people are immersed in music and fashion from their youth. Brooker and executive producer Annabel Jones felt that their concept of virtual consciousness, established in the episode "White Christmas", had more potential. One of Brooker's original concepts was based on the episode "Be Right Back", in which deceased persons' personalities are uploaded into artificial entities in a theme park that relatives can visit. This idea was scrapped with the 2016 broadcast of Westworld, in which humans visit a theme park inhabited by androids. He then recalled the 2010 BBC series The Young Ones, in which older celebrities live in a home decorated in the fashion of the 1970s and find themselves rejuvenated by the setting. Having repeatedly thought of writing an episode set in the past, Brooker wrote "San Junipero" as a period episode.

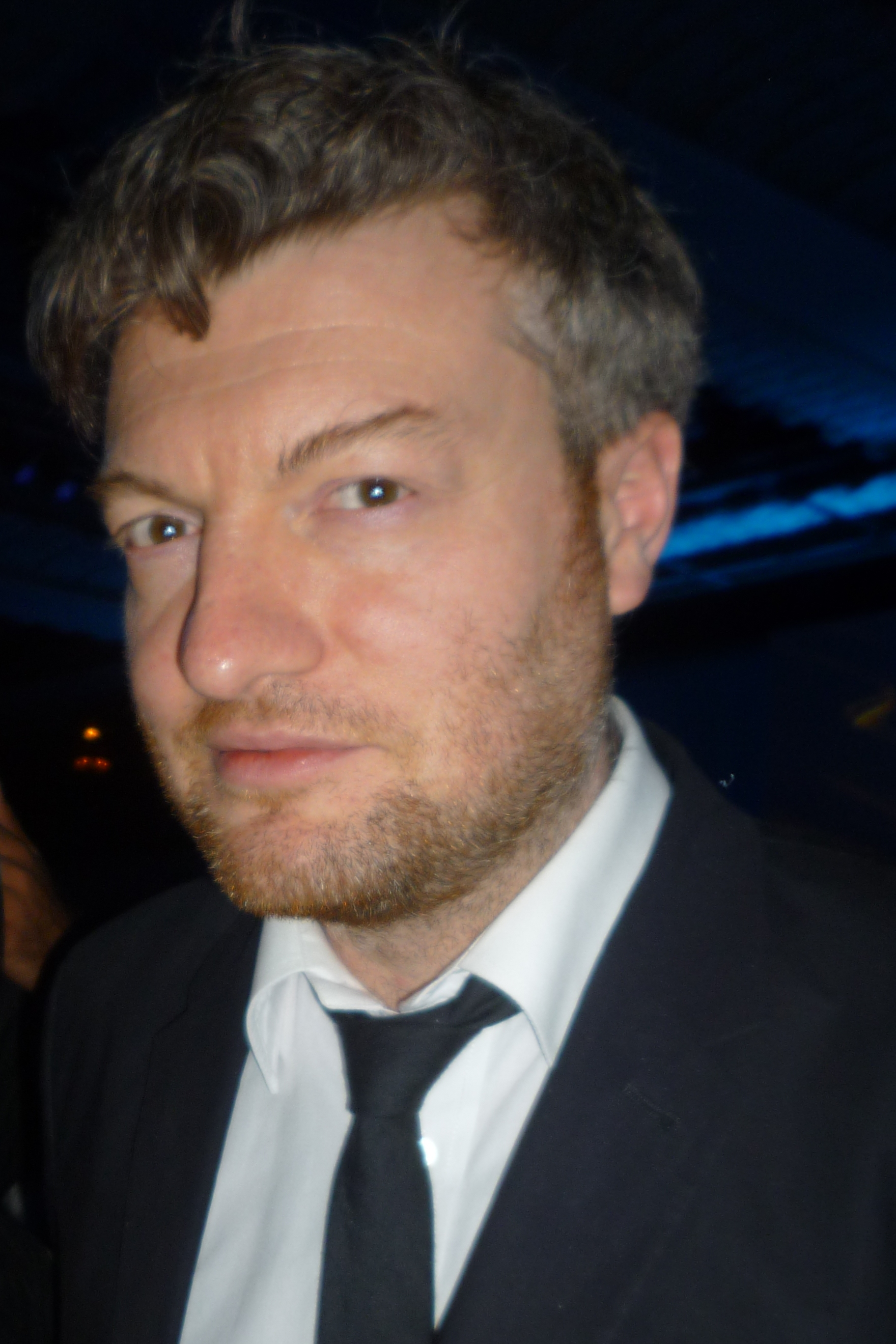
Series creator Charlie Brooker wrote the script for "San Junipero".

Brooker has said that he wrote the script for the episode in four days. In the initial draft, the love story was about a heterosexual couple, but Brooker changed it to give the episode an extra resonance, as same-sex marriage was not legal in 1987. He has said that having a twist makes the writing process easier, as "when you know that 85 percent of what's happening you can't reveal till later on, it actually sort of narrows your options in a useful way". One draft of the episode contained a scene where Kelly visits a kindergarten in San Junipero, full of children who had died, but it was removed because "it was too sad and too poignant of a note to hit in that story". Brooker chose the setting of California, a location in America rather than Britain, as a way to "upend" people's preconceptions of Black Mirror. One reviewer noted that all of the characters in "San Junipero" are American.

The episode was originally to have an unhappy ending. Brooker told The Daily Beast that in the rough treatment, the episode ended with the scene where Kelly and Yorkie meet in the hospital, but "when I sat down to actually write it, I was enjoying it so much that I thought, No, I'm going to keep going!" He conceived of Yorkie's euthanasia and expanded on Kelly's backstory, writing her emotional speech to Yorkie in one sitting. The ending came about when Brooker heard "Heaven is a Place on Earth" off a streaming playlist while writing the script, and wanted to license the song for the episode. After listening to the song and lyrics several times, he came to the final shot, which shows a bank of computer servers with flashing lights, giving literal weight to the song's title. An unused idea for the ending had the audience see Kelly and Yorkie in many different eras, such as the 1920s.

Following the episode's release, Brooker was asked about a Reddit post speculating that Kelly is simulated for Yorkie's benefit, rather than really there; he replied "Wrong! They are together", and commented that "[t]hey have the happiest ending imaginable. [...] it's not a big rainbow sandwich, but what appears to be happening there, is happening there."

=== Setting and music ===
The nightclub settings featured arcade games, which Brooker took an interest in choosing as he was a teenager during the 1980s and has worked as a video game journalist. Director Owen Harris described the 1980s as a "period in life that was really optimistic". He chose the year 1987 "fairly arbitrarily" and mentioned "very specific movie posters" in the script. Brooker put together a playlist of music from 1987 on Spotify. Some songs, such as Belinda Carlisle's "Heaven Is a Place on Earth" and the Smiths' "Girlfriend in a Coma", hint at the episode's plot twist, as do arcade games Time Crisis and The House of the Dead. Each song had to be cleared for roughly 15 years for Netflix. Every song was successfully cleared except one by Prince.

"Heaven Is a Place on Earth" plays at the episode's beginning and over the end credits. Brooker believed it would be perfect for the final scene, admitting in an interview he would have been "absolutely distraught" if they had been unable to use it. "Girlfriend in a Coma" features in the episode "for about five seconds", yet cost "an outrageous amount of money", Brooker said. Jones said the song's inclusion "was indulgent but at the same time, it was so important that we set up that era so it felt different". Robbie Nevil's song "C'est La Vie" was chosen by Harris, as it was one of the first singles he ever purchased.

The episode also featured an original score by Clint Mansell. Mansell was approached by Harris, and based the score around the previously chosen songs, including "Heaven Is a Place on Earth". He has said that the "calm electronic" score was influenced by John Hughes movies and the death of his girlfriend a year before. In December 2016, Lakeshore Records released the score for downloading and streaming.

=== Cast and filming ===
Gugu Mbatha-Raw, who plays Kelly, had heard of the show but not seen it when she received the script, though she did watch the series two episode "Be Right Back" before the shoot. Mbatha-Raw read the entire script as soon as she received it, on a bus journey from Oxford Circus to Brixton. Mackenzie Davis, who plays Yorkie, first saw the show with a friend who had pirated it; they watched "The National Anthem". Denise Burse plays the elder Kelly in the real world, as using prosthetics on Mbatha-Raw was quickly discounted. Annabel Davis was cast as elder Yorkie.

The episode's director was Owen Harris, who previously directed "Be Right Back" – an episode he described as "strangely similar" to this one as both are "relationship-led". Joel Collins served as production designer. The 1986 teen films Pretty in Pink and Ferris Bueller's Day Off were considered as inspiration to anchor the audience in "a place they know". The episode was filmed in 15 days across a three-week period, with shooting split equally between London for most of the interior shots, and Cape Town, South Africa, for most external scenes. They did not film in the United States as a cost-cutting measure. Mbatha-Raw said there was little time to rehearse, and she had little opportunity to meet Davis before shooting. Kelly's outfit was inspired by celebrities of the 1980s such as Janet Jackson and Whitney Houston, while Yorkie's outfit "looks like her mum laid it out on her bed", according to Davis. Her clothing is constant throughout the episode to subvert a "transforming geek" trope in fiction, also allowing her change to be internal rather than external.

The first day of filming was in London for the Quagmire nightclub, shot on location in the Electrowerkz nightclub venue in Islington. For the club Tucker's, a 3D model was made, which Brooker and Harris viewed with a virtual reality headset. Mbatha-Raw and Davis worked with a dance choreographer and danced to Janet Jackson's "What Have You Done for Me Lately", though Alexander O'Neal's "Fake" was used in the final edit. The alleyway scene features rain, which Harris insisted on including despite Brooker's protestations that the simulated world would not have rain. Harris said that Cape Town "has these really rich, beautiful settings" that allowed him to craft a "slightly heightened" version of California. He noted that whilst shooting Kelly and Yorkie's argument on the beach, an "incredible mist rolled in from the ocean", which caused difficulties but led to "some really lovely texture". Mbatha-Raw said that almost every scene was shot at night or dusk, particularly the exterior scenes.

=== Editing ===
The episode contains hints leading up to the reveal of the twist. For example, the choice of the song "Girlfriend in a Coma", and the use of the arcade games Time Crisis and The House of the Dead allude to the true reality of the episode. More overtly, Yorkie reacts viscerally to seeing a car accident in an arcade game, an element that Brooker was surprised was not picked up by viewers earlier. While Yorkie plays Bubble Bobble in the arcade, she is informed that "it's got different endings, depending if you're in one or two player". A factor considered during the editing process was how overt the hints should be. Annabel Jones said that "there may be visual signifiers that you think were going to work and then didn't, so you need more exposition in the edit". Adjustments were also made using sound design techniques such as sound effects.

== Marketing ==
External videos
- "Black Mirror – Season 3"; The trailer for series three of Black Mirror.
- "Orange is the New Black Mirror"; A crossover clip released by Netflix.

The titles of the six episodes that make up series 3 were announced in July 2016, along with the release date. A trailer for series three, featuring an amalgamation of clips and sound bites from the six episodes, was released by Netflix on 7 October 2016. A short clip "Orange Is the New Black Mirror", released by Netflix in 2017, is a crossover between this episode and Orange is the New Black, featuring characters Poussey and Taystee from the latter reunited in San Junipero.

== Analysis ==
Reviewers have described "San Junipero" as a highly optimistic, emotionally rooted love story and a work of science fiction. It features the first same-sex couple in Black Mirror. Rebecca Nicholson of The Guardian wrote that it "leaves you believing in the power of love to fight pain and loneliness". Some reviewers noted that the love story "transcends consciousness". The episode also has unhappy elements and has been called "bittersweet". It evokes nostalgia for the 1980s with its soundtrack and its style, and can be considered a period piece. It also raises questions about death and the afterlife. Esquire reviewer Emma Dibdin called it a "modern fairy tale".

At the time of its release, "San Junipero" was said to be the most different from other Black Mirror episodes due to its more hopeful tone. Mat Elfring of GameSpot described it as the only episode with "warmth to it", and Digital Spy reviewer Morgan Jeffery called it the "most upbeat and positive". Zack Handlen of The A.V. Club believed that the previous episodes' sad tone heightens the effectiveness of "San Junipero", and Jacob Stolworthy of The Independent thought that it was consequently the show's most ambitious episode. Variety critic Sonia Saraiya pointed out that technology is portrayed as good in "San Junipero", a rarity in the show. The Atlantic reviewer David Sims noted that the episode follows the season's darkest episode, "Shut Up and Dance".

The episode subverts a common trope in television of killing off lesbian characters: though Kelly and Yorkie die, they have a happy ending. Some felt its Emmy Awards marked a cultural shift in relation to portrayal of lesbianism, or proof of concept that works dealing with LGBT characters need not be tragic. "San Junipero" has also been cited as an example of bisexual lighting, in which neon pink and deep blue – the colours on the bisexual pride flag – represent bisexual characters. Amelia Perrin of Cosmopolitan criticised that this and the episode's nightclub setting reinforce a stereotype of bisexuality as "a 'phase' or something experimental".

The episode's plot raises many philosophical questions, including the nature of consciousness and experience and the consequences of digitally simulated existence, though these issues are not the episode's focus. Reviewers have questioned what San Junipero would mean to believers in an afterlife, and what would happen to its inhabitants in case of technical malfunctions.

== Reception ==
At the time of its release, "San Junipero" was very popular among fans, (Note: "San Junipero" is described as the show's most popular episode by reviewers for Complex, Entertainment Weekly, Vulture and The Daily Beast.) which has been attributed to its emotive presentation of a love story with a happy ending. It has been favourably received by critics, garnering an approval of 93% from 27 critics on Rotten Tomatoes, and an average rating of 8/10. Critics' consensus on the website reads, "Black Mirror delivers an uncharacteristically uplifting and enjoyable ending in "San Junipero", an especially bright and sweetly surprising episode that benefits greatly from its vibrant lead performances." The episode was rated five stars out of five in the Irish Independent and an A in The A.V. Club. Along with "Nosedive", Benjamin Lee of The Guardian gave the episode four stars, while The Telegraph gave "San Junipero" three stars. It has been described by critics as one of the "best hours" and one of the "most beautiful, cinematic episodes" of television in 2016.

Mbatha-Raw's and Davis's performances were universally praised. (Note: Mbatha-Raw and Davis have been praised in Collider, the Irish Independent, IGN, Paste, and IndieWire.) Sims lauded the couple's chemistry and said the pair concisely communicate "a whole lifetime of angst and desires". Mullane commented that the strong acting keeps the audience interested prior to the plot twist. Caitlin Welsh of Junkee complimented the "understated, pitch-perfect" performances for making the characters' relationship feel genuine. Mbatha-Raw and Davis were praised for their emotional range, for giving "fierce and vulnerable performances", and for anchoring the episode.

Mbatha-Raw and Davis also received praise in negative reviews. Robbie Collin of The Daily Telegraph criticised the characters' dialogue but praised that the ending is emotional due to Mbatha-Raw's "vivacity and conviction". Aubrey Page of Collider reviewed that the episode is unoriginal, but this is compensated by the perfect casting and emotion of the acting. However, Andrew Wallenstein of Variety criticised Mbatha-Raw and Davis for an inability to "pack the emotional punch" needed for the episode to stand out.

The episode's plot twist, revealing that San Junipero is a simulated reality, was commended by critics. Pat Stacey of Irish Independent called the twist "ingenious" while Louisa Mellor of Den of Geek described it as "captivating". Adam Chitwood of Collider noted that there is more to the episode than its twist and praised Harris for how the story unfolds. Similarly, Alex Mullane of Digital Spy said the developments in the story are "refreshing" as they are not presented as twists. Handlen liked how the episode finds a balance between revealing information and making the audience care about the characters.

The episode's visual style and music, which evoke the 1980s, were well received. IndieWire praised both the production design and soundtrack. Mullane called Mansell's score "wonderfully tender". The Wrap reviewers said that the episode was "visually stunning" and its nostalgia for the 80s was "joyous".

Many critics admired the emotion the episode evokes, and how it ventured into a new genre for the show. Corey Atad of Esquire and Tim Goodman of The Hollywood Reporter both opined that the story would leave viewers in tears, and Adam David of CNN Philippines cried whilst watching it. Stacey found the episode "extremely moving". Scott Meslow of GQ called it "breathtakingly and tear-jerkingly human". Lee was surprised by the episode's poignancy, while Mellor wrote that it is "genuinely moving". Mullane said the episode demonstrated that the show can tell stories without a dark tone, and Jacob Hall of /Film concurred. Wallenstein called the episode "satisfyingly daring", although he ranked it poorly in comparison to other episodes.

The episode has also received negative criticism from a minority of critics. Collin noted that the episode's central conceit has been widely used within the science fiction genre. Stolworthy criticised the third act as "overloaded" and commented that "San Junipero", rather than "Hated in the Nation", should have been 90 minutes long.

=== Black Mirror episode rankings ===
"San Junipero" appeared on many critics' rankings of the 23 installments in the Black Mirror series, from best to worst.

- 1st – Ed Power, The Telegraph
- 2nd – Matt Donnelly and Tim Molloy, TheWrap
- 2nd – James Hibberd, Entertainment Weekly
- 3rd (of the Top Seven) – Al Horner, GQ
- 3rd – Corey Atad, Esquire
- 3rd – Travis Clark, Business Insider
- 4th (of the Top Ten) – Gina Carbone, CinemaBlend
- 4th – Morgan Jeffery, Digital Spy
- 4th – Aubrey Page, Collider
- 6th – Charles Bramesco, Vulture

Following the fifth series, Brian Tallerico of Vulture rated Mbatha-Raw's performance the fourth best of Black Mirror. Additionally, Proma Khosla of Mashable ranked the 22 Black Mirror instalments excluding Bandersnatch by tone, concluding that "San Junipero" is the second-least pessimistic episode of the show after "Hang the DJ".

The episode also appears on critics' rankings of the 19 episodes from series 1 to series 4:

- 2nd – Eric Anthony Glover, Entertainment Tonight
- 4th – Steve Greene, Hanh Nguyen and Liz Shannon Miller, IndieWire

Other critics ranked the 13 episodes in Black Mirror's first three series.

- 1st – Jacob Hall, /Film
- 2nd – Adam David, CNN Philippines
- 3rd – Mat Elfring, GameSpot
- 3rd (of the Top Ten) – Brendan Doyle, Comingsoon.net
- 9th – Andrew Wallenstein, Variety

"San Junipero" has been widely described as the best episode of series three of Black Mirror. (Note: The episode has been described as such in The New York Times, IGN, GameSpot, The Atlantic, Junkee, Vox and Collider.) It has also appeared at various ranks on critics' lists of series three episodes by quality.

- 1st – Liam Hoofe, Flickering Myth
- 5th – Jacob Stolworthy and Christopher Hooton, The Independent

=== End-of-year lists ===
"San Junipero" appears in multiple critics' lists of the best episodes of television from 2016.

- 1st of 15 – Den of Geek, 25 reviewers
- 2nd of 9 – The Guardian, 7 reviewers
- 2nd of 20 – Variety, Sonia Saraiya
- 3rd of 33 – Vox, Caroline Framke and Emily VanDerWerff
- 5th of 10 – Entertainment Weekly
- 7th of 25 – IndieWire, Ben Travers, Hanh Nguyen, Liz Shannon Miller
- 9th of 10 – Time, Daniel D'Addario
- 9th of 25 – Paste
- 18th of 20 – Esquire, Emma Dibdin

Other critics listed their favourite episodes of television in 2016, without giving an order. "San Junipero" appears on these lists:

- Top 10 – The Washington Post, Bethanie Butler
- Top 10 – The New York Times, 4 reviewers
- Top 10 – Cinema Blend, Laura Hurley
- Top 12 – GQ, Scott Meslow
- Top 15 – The Hollywood Reporter, Tim Goodman and Daniel Fienberg

=== Awards ===
In 2017, "San Junipero" won two Primetime Emmy Awards, as well as two BAFTA Television Craft Awards. It has also won or been nominated for several other accolades:

List of awards and nominations received by "San Junipero"
| Year | Award | Category | Recipients | Result | Ref. |
|---|---|---|---|---|---|
| 2017 | Art Directors Guild Awards | Excellence in Production Design for a Television Movie or Limited Series | Joel Collins, James Foster and Nicholas Palmer (Also nominated for "Nosedive" and "Playtest".) | Nominated | |
| 2017 | BAFTA Television Craft Awards | Best Make Up and Hair Design | Tanya Lodge | Won | |
| 2017 | BAFTA Television Craft Awards | Best Costume Design | Susie Coulthard | Won | |
| 2017 | Cinema Audio Society Awards | Outstanding Achievement in Sound Mixing for Television Movies and Mini-Series | Adrian Bell, Martin Jensen, Philip Clements and Rory de Carteret | Nominated | |
| 2017 | Diversity in Media Awards | TV Moment of the Year | "San Junipero" | Nominated | |
| 2017 | GLAAD Media Awards | Outstanding Individual Episode (in a series without a regular LGBT character) | "San Junipero" | Won | |
| 2017 | IGN Awards | Best TV Episode | "San Junipero" | Won | |
| 2017 | Hugo Awards | Best Dramatic Presentation, Short Form | Charlie Brooker, Owen Harris | Nominated | |
| 2017 | Online Film and Television Association Awards | Best Motion Picture | "San Junipero" | Won | |
| 2017 | Online Film and Television Association Awards | Best Production Design in a Non-Series | "San Junipero" | Nominated | |
| 2017 | Online Film and Television Association Awards | Best Costume Design in a Non-Series | "San Junipero" | Nominated | |
| 2017 | Primetime Emmy Awards | Outstanding Television Movie | Charlie Brooker, Annabel Jones and Laurie Borg | Won | |
| 2017 | Primetime Emmy Awards | Outstanding Writing for a Limited Series, Movie, or Dramatic Special | Charlie Brooker | Won | |
| 2018 | Broadcast Awards | Best Single Drama | "San Junipero" | Won | |

== Future ==
In August 2017, Brooker said there were no plans for a sequel episode to "San Junipero". He told the Los Angeles Times that "we want to keep [Kelly and Yorkie] happy there". In an interview with NME, Brooker mentioned that some ideas for the episode were later removed, such as a scene with a kindergarten in San Junipero that "felt like a whole world in and of itself". He raised the idea of doing a sequel in "a completely different form", such as a graphic novel or "an experience". "San Junipero" has been alluded to through Easter eggs in subsequent episodes: for example, "Black Museum" shows Kelly's and Yorkie's dresses on display in a museum, and features a hospital named Saint Juniper's. The first episode of season 7 "Common People" features a hotel called "Juniper" where the lead characters spend their most precious time together. The third episode of Season 7 "Hotel Reverie" features a similar theme of simulated reality, and ends with the main character receiving a package at their doorstep addressed to 3049 Junipero Drive.
