= Tanisha Lynn =

American actress (born 1978)

- Born: Tanisha Lynn Eanes; September 14, 1978 (age 47); Houston, Texas, United States
- Occupation: Actress

Tanisha Lynn Eanes, known professionally as Tanisha Lynn and T. Lynn Eanes (born September 14, 1978 in Houston, Texas) is an American actress.

== Brief biography ==
Lynn is best known for her portrayal of Danielle Frye, the daughter of Derek Frye (formerly William Christian and currently Charles Parnell) and Mimi Reed (Shari Headley), a role which she played from March 2004 until January 2007 on the show All My Children. Although rumors about Lynn's status with the show were circulating for some time, due to her lack of storyline, it was reported at Pine Valley Bulletin: Ins and Outs in January 2007 that Lynn had taped her final scenes in December 2006, last to air in late January. She graduated from the Theatre Department at the High School for the Performing and Visual Arts in Houston and went on to the Tisch School of the Arts at NYU.

She also appearanced as Audrey in Shakespeare's As You Like It at Worth Street Theater Company.

== Filmography ==
=== Film ===
Year	Title	Role	Notes
2003	Robot Stories	Assistant	
2004	The Code	Xenia Rex	
2008	Skeletons in the Desert	Jade Niel	
2010	Perfect Combination	Jazmine	
2010	Speed Dating	Kelly	Uncredited
2012	Murder on the 13th Floor	Becca	
2013	Cryptogram	Xenia Rex	
2018	Woman on the Edge	Calleigh Jones	Credited as T. Lynn Eanes

=== Television ===
Year	Title	Role	Notes
2003	Law & Order: Special Victims Unit	Ricky	Season 4, Fallacy
2003	My Wife & Kids	Ricky	Season 4, While Out
2004-07	All My Children	Danielle Frye	32 Episodes
2009	Saving Grace	Ginger Metarie	Season 2, But There's Clay
2009	90210	Sasha's Friend	2 Episodes
2010	How I Met Your Mother	Esme	Season 5, Say Cheese
2010	House of Payne	Tory	Season 6, Worth Fighting For
2010	Hollywood is Like High School With Money	Michelle	Season 1, Embrace Your Inner Geek
2010-11	The Bay	Vivian Johnson	9 Episodes
2016	Ray Donovan	Sugar	Season 4, Chinese Algebra

== Personal life ==
Lynn parents are William Eanes and Brenda Davis. She has two siblings: Kenneth Davis and Brent Eanes. She makes guest appearances in Tyler Perry's series on TBS called Tyler Perry's House of Payne, 2010 season.
