= Doc Shaw =

American actor (born 1992)

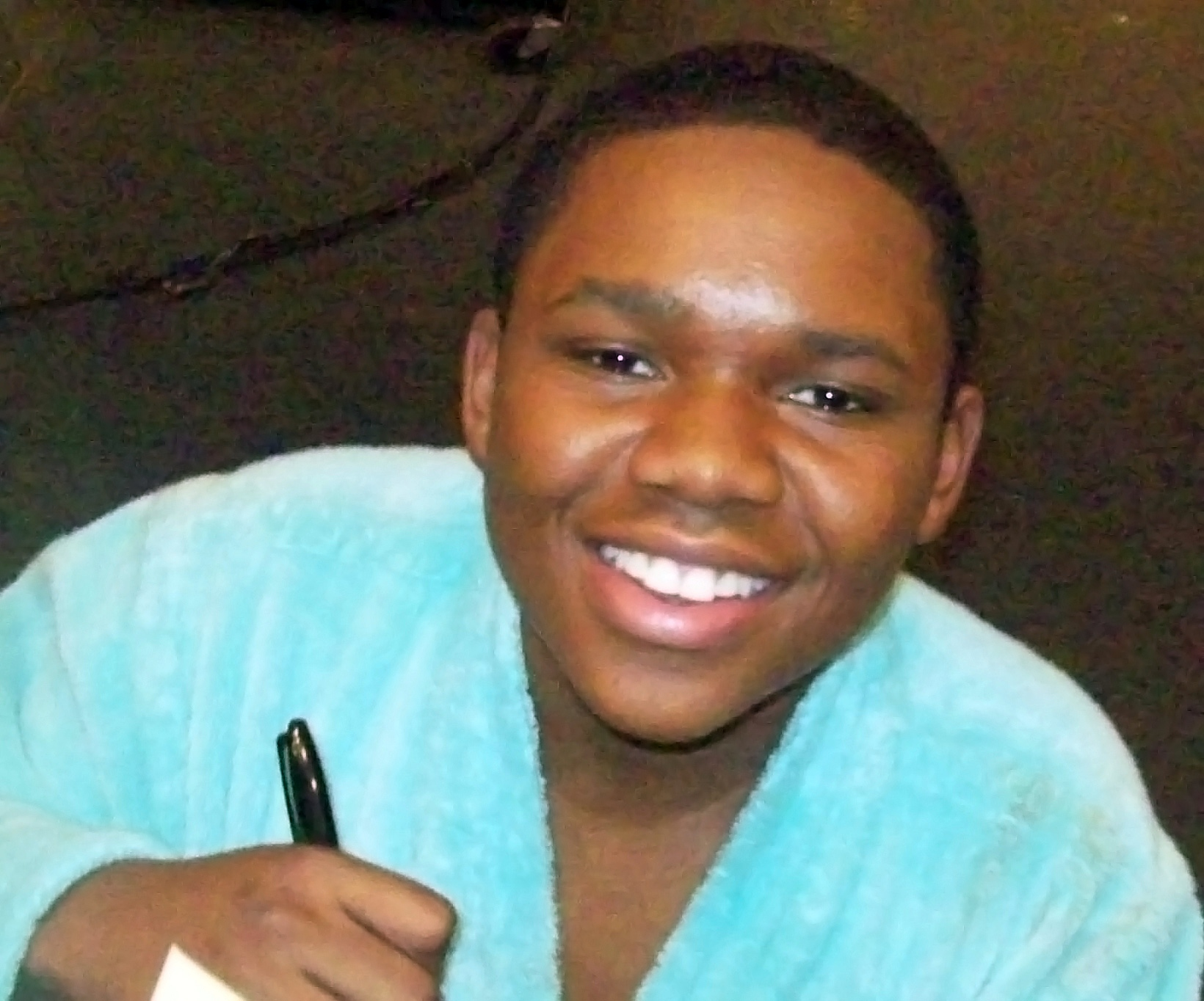
- Born: April 24, 1992 (age 34); Atlanta, Georgia

Larramie Cortez "Doc" Shaw (born April 24, 1992) is an American actor. He is best known for his roles as Malik Payne in Tyler Perry's House of Payne, Marcus Little in The Suite Life on Deck, and King Boomer in Pair of Kings.

== Life and career ==
Shaw was born in Atlanta, Georgia. He appeared in print ads and acted in television commercials.

In 2006 Shaw earned the role of Malik Payne on the TBS sitcom, Tyler Perry's House of Payne. His character Malik is introduced as a witty preteen whose antics often land him in unintentional trouble. As he matures into an adult, he is given age-appropriate storylines, and by the seventh season he is expecting his first child with his live-in girlfriend.

Shaw was a presenter at the 39th annual NAACP Image Awards ceremony in 2008.

Shaw joined the cast of Disney Channel sitcom The Suite Life on Deck for the show's second season which began airing on August 7, 2009, although he did not make his debut until the episode "Roomies," which aired on October 16, 2009. He played Marcus Little, a former Grammy Award winner whose career ended after his record label dumped him. On August 20, 2010, Shaw made his final appearance in The Suite Life on Deck.

Shaw next appeared on Pair of Kings with Mitchel Musso from Hannah Montana. Shaw made his singing and rapping debut on the Pair of Kings theme song, "Top of the World", also performed by Musso. The song was featured on Radio Disney on September 10, 2010. Pair of Kings aired on Disney XD.

== Filmography ==
=== Film ===
Year	Title	Role	Notes
2008	Open Season 2	Additional voices	
2010	Nobody Loves Me	Big D	
2012	Thunderstruck	Mitch	
2014	Dawn of the Planet of the Apes	Ash	

=== Television ===
Year	Title	Role	Notes
2006–2012, 2020–present	Tyler Perry's House of Payne	Malik Payne	Main role
2007	The King of Queens	Reilly	Special guest
2009–2010	The Suite Life on Deck	Marcus Little/Lil' Little	Main role (seasons 2–3)
2010–2013	Pair of Kings	King Boomer Parker	Lead role
2013	Emily Owens, M.D.	Ethan Gorgia	Episode: "Emily and... The Teapot"
2014	See Dad Run	Robbie	Episode: "See Dad Run Into Marcus' Nephew"
2018	The Paynes	Malik Payne	3 episodes

== Music ==
Year	Title	Other	Notes
2010	"Top of the World"	Mitchel Musso	from Pair of Kings
