= LaVan Davis =

American actor

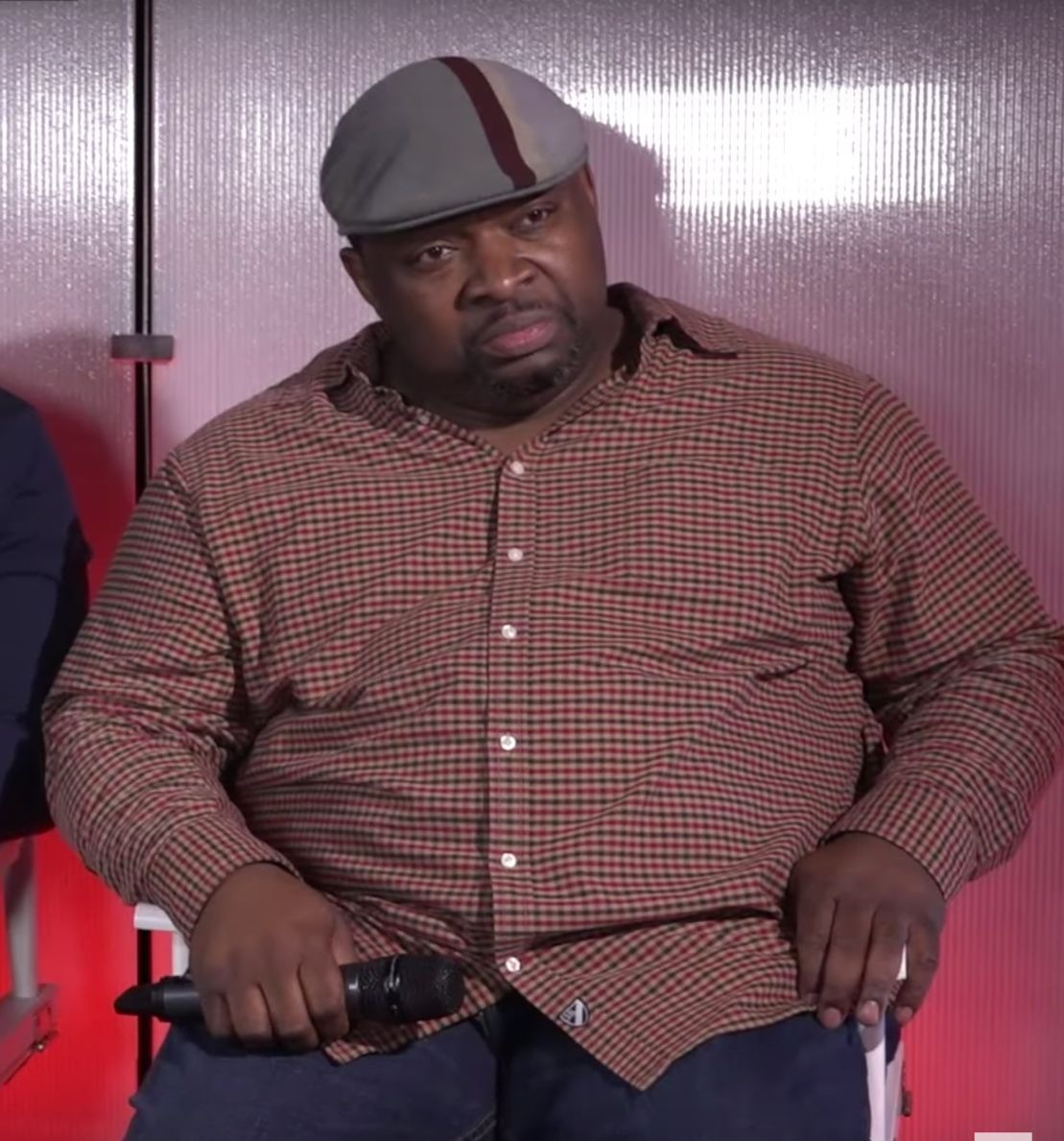
- Davis in 2018
- Born: September 21, 1966 (age 59); Atlanta, Georgia, U.S.
- Occupation: Actor
- Years active: 2004–present

LaVan Davis (born September 21, 1966) is an American actor who played the character Curtis Payne on Tyler Perry's TV shows House of Payne (2006–2012, 2020-present) and The Paynes (2018).

== Career ==
Davis' acting career began in 2004 with his first role as Leroy in the film Mindbenders. In 2005, he made a guest appearance in two episodes of Everybody Hates Chris as a preacher. The following year, Davis was cast as the cranky patriarch of the Payne family, Curtis Payne, in the TBS sitcom Tyler Perry's House of Payne. Davis worked with Perry again in two of his feature films including Daddy's Little Girls in 2007 and Tyler Perry's Meet the Browns in 2008.

In addition to his work in films and television, Davis has also appeared in the stage plays Why Did I Get Married? as Poppy, Why Good Girls Like Bad Boyz as JD, and Madea Goes to Jail as Leo.

== Filmography ==
Year	Title	Role	Notes
1994	What Goes Around Comes Around The Play	Pete	
1995	Why Good Girls Like Bad Boyz	JD	
2005	Madea Goes to Jail: The Play	Leo	
2006	Puff, Puff, Pass	Otis Jenkins	
2007	Tyler Perry's Daddy's Little Girls	Lester	Small role in bar; musician/singer
2008	Tyler Perry's Meet the Browns	Bus Driver	Small role
2007–2012, 2020–present	Tyler Perry's House of Payne	Curtis Payne	Lead role; 254 episodes
2018	Tyler Perry's The Paynes	Curtis Payne	Lead role: 38 episodes
