= Allen Payne =

American actor

- Born: Allen Roberts; July 7, 1968 (age 58); New York City, New York, U.S.
- Occupation: Actor
- Years active: 1989–present
- Known for: New Jack City; Jason's Lyric; Tyler Perry's House of Payne

Allen Payne (born July 7, 1968) is an American actor. He is best known for his role as Jason Alexander in the 1994 drama film Jason's Lyric, as well as his portrayal of C.J. Payne on the family sitcom Tyler Perry's House of Payne (2006–2012, 2020-present). Payne is also known for his portrayal of Lance Rodman on NBC's The Cosby Show during its final two seasons. On film, Payne also played Gerald "Gee Money" Wells in the 1991 film New Jack City, and Detective Justice in the 1995 film Vampire in Brooklyn.

== Life and career ==
Payne was born Allen Roberts in the Harlem neighborhood of New York City, the eldest son of Allen Roberts and Barbara Reeves. He attended Pennsauken High School in Pennsauken Township, New Jersey.

Payne's first television role was in a 1990 episode of The Cosby Show. Over the span of two seasons he played the role of Lance Rodman, the boyfriend of the character Charmaine. Payne subsequently appeared in episodes of The Fresh Prince Of Bel-Air and Malcolm & Eddie.

Payne has appeared in many films. He played "Dead Mike" in the Nelson George-produced and Chris Rock-written hip-hop parody CB4. He also appeared in New Jack City, Jason's Lyric, Vampire in Brooklyn, Double Platinum, and The Perfect Storm. He also appeared in the Stacy Lattisaw video I'm Not The Same Girl.

Since 2006, he has starred as C.J. Payne on Tyler Perry's House of Payne. In 2018, he reprised his role from House of Payne on the short-lived spinoff The Paynes that was ultimately cancelled in favor of the parent series’ reboot.

In 2022, he also stars and reprised his role as "Gee Money" in the stage adaptation of New Jack City: Live on Stage, produced by playwright Je'Caryous Johnson.

== Filmography ==
=== Film ===
Year	Title	Role	Notes
1989	Rooftops	Kadim	
1989	Cookie	Extra	
1991	New Jack City	Gee Money	
1993	CB4	Euripides Smalls/Dead Mike	
1994	Jason's Lyric	Jason Alexander	
1995	The Walking Dead	Cole Evans	
1995	The Tuskegee Airmen	Walter Peoples	TV movie
1995	Vampire in Brooklyn	Detective Justice	
1998	A Price Above Rubies	Ramon Garcia	
1999	Double Platinum	Ric Ortega	TV movie
2000	The Perfect Storm	Alfred Pierre	
2001	30 Years to Life	Malik	
2001	Commitments	Van Compton	TV movie
2001	Blue Hill Avenue	Tristan	
2003	Men Cry In The Dark	-	Video
2003	Playas Ball	Cedric Tinsley	
2006	Crossover	Kemp	
2021	The Fight That Never Ends	Leon Watkins	TV movie
2024	Outlaw Posse	Jeremiah	

=== Television ===
Year	Title	Role	Notes
1990–92	The Cosby Show	Lance Rodman	Recurring cast: Season 7-8
1992	The Fresh Prince of Bel-Air	Marcus Stokes	Episode: "My Brother's Keeper"
1992	A Different World	Lance Rodman	Episode: "Conflict of Interest"
1993	Roc	James	Episode: "The Parent Thing"
1996	Malcolm & Eddie	Preston	Episode: "Do the K.C. Hustle"
2004	All of Us	Larry	Episode: "Used Ta Be My Girl"
2004	CSI: NY	Willie Chancey	Episode: "Officer Blue"
2007–12	Tyler Perry's House of Payne	C.J. Payne	Main Cast
2018	The Paynes	C.J. Payne	Recurring cast
2020–	Tyler Perry's House of Payne	C.J. Payne	Main Cast

=== Stage ===
Year	Production	Role
2022–2024	New Jack City: Live on Stage	Gee Money
2025	Jason's Lyric: Live!	Jason Alexander
