= Denise Burse =

American actress

- Born: Atlanta, Georgia, U.S.
- Occupation: Actress

Denise Burse-Mickelbury is an American actress, best known for her role as Claretha Jenkins in the television series Tyler Perry's House of Payne.

== Acting career ==
An African-American native of Atlanta, Burse received professional training at the Just Us Theatre, The Alliance Theatre and The Atlanta Children's Theater. She has numerous television credits such as Law & Order: Special Victims Unit and Law & Order: Criminal Intent. Burse has also appeared in various stage productions such as An American Daughter, Harriet’s Return, Ground People, Pearl Cleage's Flyin' West, and Radio Golf. In 2016, she appeared in "San Junipero", an episode of the anthology series Black Mirror.

=== Filmography ===
Year	Title	Role	Notes
1992, 1999	Law & Order	ER Nurse #2	Episode: "Consultation"
1992, 1999	Law & Order	Sarah Chase	Episode: "Haven"
1995	New York Undercover	Mrs. Denise Reyes	Episode: "Mama Said Knock You Out"
1996	The Juror	Secretary Mary	
1996	Basquiat	Mary on TV	
1999	Funny Valentines	Brenda	
2000	The Sopranos	Nurse #2	Episode: "From Where to Eternity"
2000	Cosby	Mrs. Henderson	Episode: "Thursday's Child"
2000–2001	Law & Order: Special Victims Unit	Counselor Scheider	Episode: "Wrong Is Right"
2000–2001	Law & Order: Special Victims Unit	Pamela Tatum	Episode: "Inheritance"
2001	Third Watch	Brigette	Episode: "Exposing Faith"
2001	100 Centre Street	Joy Glass	Episode: "Love Stories"
2005	Law & Order: Criminal Intent	Sarah Edgars	Episode: "Ex Stasis"
2005	On the One (Preaching to the Choir)	Sister Marcie	
2006–2011	Tyler Perry's House of Payne	Claretha Jenkins	Main role (Seasons 1–6); Recurring role (Season 7–8); 47 episodes
2016	Black Mirror	Elder Kelly	Episode: "San Junipero"
2017	Greenleaf	Ethlin Satterlee	Episode: "A Mother's Love"
2018	One Dollar	Anna Woodrow	Episode: "Wilson Furlbee"
2019	New Amsterdam	Marlene	Episode: "King of Swords"
2019	The Marvelous Mrs. Maisel	Woman in Apollo Audience	Episode: "A Jewish Girl Walks Into the Apollo..."
2020–2021	Manifest	Estelle Vance	Episodes: "Call Sign" and "Deadhead"
2022	The Last Days of Ptolemy Grey	Shirley Wring	Recurring role, 4 episodes
2023	The Wrath of Becky	Elena Cahn	
