= Sierra McClain =

American actress and singer (born 1994)

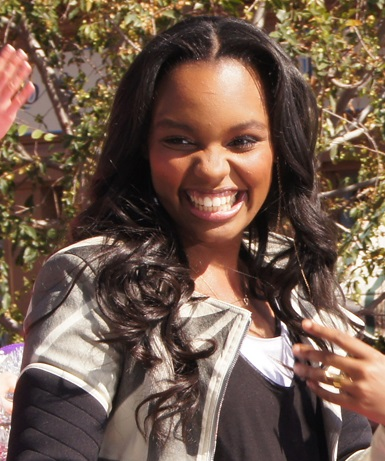
- McClain at the 2011 Disney Parks Christmas Day Parade
- Born: Sierra Aylina McClain; March 16, 1994 (age 32); Decatur, Georgia, U.S.
- Occupations: Actress; singer
- Years active: 2005–present
- Parent(s): Michael McClain (father); Shontell McClain (mother)
- Relatives: China Anne McClain (sister); Lauryn McClain (sister); Gabriel McClain (brother)
- Musical career
- Genres: Pop; R&B
- Instruments: Vocals; guitar; piano

Sierra Aylina McClain (born March 16, 1994) is an American actress and singer. As an actress, she was first recognized for her role as Sierra in Daddy's Little Girls (2007). She had her breakthrough as Nessa Parker in Empire (2016–2018), and is also best known for starring as Tanya Clifton in the television series Mindhunter (2019), and as Grace Ryder in 9-1-1: Lone Star (2020–2023). Her film roles have included starring as Tosha in the film Honey: Rise Up and Dance (2018), and as Carina in Shrink (2009).

As a singer, she is best known as a member of her family pop/R&B group, Thriii, with her sisters.

== Early life ==
Sierra was born in Decatur, GA, the eldest daughter of father Michael and mother Shontell McClain. Michael is a music producer who produced Solange Knowles' debut album Solo Star (2002). Shontell (née Rucker) is a songwriter and former television screenwriter.

Sierra has two younger sisters, actress/singers Lauryn (born January 9, 1997) and China Anne (born August 25, 1998), and a younger brother, actor Gabriel (born April 17, 2001).

== Career ==
=== Acting ===
==== 2005–2010: Daddy's Little Girls ====
After Sierra's sister China was discovered in 2004 by a music executive who heard her sing, China was cast in the film The Gospel (2005), with Sierra cast in the children's choir.

In December 2005, while on the set of Tyler Perry's House of Payne, China introduced Sierra and Lauryn to a show producer and they performed a song for him. They were then cast in the film Daddy's Little Girls (2007) as the James sisters, and Sierra guest starred in the series, Tyler Perry's House of Payne.

Sierra had a small role as a neighbor in the short film Six Blocks Wide (2008). The next year, she starred as Carina in the film Shrink alongside Kevin Spacey and Keke Palmer.

==== 2015–present: Empire and 9-1-1: Lone Star ====
In September 2015, McClain was cast in a Showtime pilot by Lena Waithe, but it was not picked up. In 2016, McClain was cast and began starring as Nessa Parker, a recurring role, in the television series Empire (2016–2018). For the series, she sang several songs for the series' soundtrack, and her role as Nessa is considered her breakthrough role.

Sierra went on to star as Tosha in the dance film Honey: Rise Up and Dance (2018). She gained further recognition for other lead roles, starring as Tanya Clifton in the second season of the critically-acclaimed television series Mindhunter (2019), and as Grace Ryder in 9-1-1: Lone Star (2020–2023).

=== Music ===
==== 2005–2010: 3mcclaingirls ====
Around 2005, Sierra, China and Lauren formed the music group, 3mcclaingirls. In 2008, the sisters began posting videos of themselves performing cover songs on their YouTube channel.

==== 2011–2014: McClain Sisters and A.N.T. Farm ====
After China landed her own show on the Disney Channel called A.N.T. Farm in 2011, the sisters changed their group name to "McClain Sisters", and sang two songs on the A.N.T. Farm soundtrack: "Perfect Mistake" and "Electronic Apology". Sierra was also a theme-music composer for the series.

In December, the group performed their version of the song "Jingle Bell Rock" at the 2011 Disney Parks Christmas Day Parade.

In March 2012, the group signed with Hollywood Records, released their song "Rise", and was the opening act in Houston at the Houston Rodeo for Big Time Rush on their Better with U Tour. In April, they performed at the 2012 White House Easter Egg Roll. Most notably they released "The Great Divide", which peaked at number four on Billboard's US Kid Digital Songs.

In November 2012, Sierra guest-starred with sister Lauryn and performed the song "Go" during the episode "chANTs of a Lifetime" for A.N.T. Farm.

In December 2013, China announced on Twitter that A.N.T. Farm would be ending after its third season. Shortly afterward, McClain Sisters parted ways with Hollywood Records, and again changed the group's name, from "McClain Sisters" to simply "McClain".

==== 2014–2020: McClain ====
The group McClain continued performing, releasing songs and making appearances. They performed at the pre-show for the 2014 Radio Disney Music Awards and presented an award, had their first headlining concert at the House of Blues in Anaheim, California, and performed at the 19th Arthur Ashe Kids' Day. From the summer to the fall of 2014, the group embarked on a state fair tour around the United States.

Around 2016, the group McClain went on hiatus after all three sisters booked various acting roles.

==== 2020–present: Thriii ====
In June 2020, the group McClain changed their name to "Thriii" and performed at Radio Disney Presents ARDYs Summer Playlist.

== Personal life ==
When she was young, Sierra resided with her family near Atlanta, Georgia, but they later moved to Los Angeles for China's acting career.

Sierra is a Christian, but says she considers herself more spiritual than religious. She wants to have a lot of children, in part because she considers her siblings as her best friends, and wants her own kids to experience the same.

== Filmography ==
=== Film ===
Year	Title	Role	Notes
2005	The Gospel	Youth in Children's Choir	
2007	Daddy's Little Girls	Sierra	
2008	Six Blocks Wide	Neighbor	Short film
2009	Shrink	Carina	
2018	Honey: Rise Up and Dance	Tosha	
2024	Brewster's Millions: Christmas	Toya	

=== Television ===
Year	Title	Role	Notes
2007	Tyler Perry's House of Payne	Jasmine	Episodes: "Paternity and Fraternity: Parts 1 & 2"
2012	A.N.T. Farm	Syerra	Episode: "chANTs of a Lifetime"
2015	Untitled Lena Waithe Pilot	Jerrika	Pilot (unaired)
2016–2018	Empire	Nessa Parker	Recurring role (seasons 3–4)
2019	Mindhunter	Tanya Clifton	Main role
2020–2023	9-1-1: Lone Star	Grace Ryder	Main role (seasons 1–4); 53 episodes
