= Eyes Wide Open (Sabrina Carpenter album) =

Studio album by Sabrina Carpenter
- Released: April 14, 2015
- Recorded: 2013–2015
- Studios: The Guest House, Sleepwalker Studios, Captain Cuts Studios, The Synagogue and SOMD Studios, The Firestation (Los Angeles, California); Gordon Studio DK
- Genres: Folk-pop; teen pop
- Length: 40:32
- Label: Hollywood
- Producers: Mitch Allan; Jerrod Bettis; Dan Book; Brian Malouf; Jim McGorman; Robb Vallier; Steven Solomon; Captain Cuts; Matthew Tishler; Jon Ingoldsby; Jon Levine; Jordan Higgins; Lindsay Rush; Matt Squire; Steve Tippeconic; Scott Harris; John Gordon; Julie Frost

Sabrina Carpenter chronology
Can't Blame a Girl for Trying (2014)	Eyes Wide Open (2015)	Evolution (2016)

Singles from Eyes Wide Open
- 1. "We'll Be the Stars" Released: January 13, 2015; 2. "Eyes Wide Open" Released: April 7, 2015

Eyes Wide Open is the debut studio album by American singer Sabrina Carpenter. It was released by Hollywood Records on April 14, 2015. Carpenter began planning the project in 2014, after she launched her debut EP Can't Blame a Girl for Trying, as she wanted to make a full-length album. All the tracks on that EP were included on the album. The album was recorded from 2013 to 2015 with the majority of the album being recorded in 2014. Musically, Eyes Wide Open is a folk-pop and teen pop record with acoustic and country influences. Its production consists of guitars, piano, drums and keyboards. Thematically, the album focuses on Carpenter's personal experiences, friendship, love and teenage problems.

The album received positive reviews from music critics and debuted at number 43 on the US Billboard 200, number 31 on the US Billboard Top Album Sales chart, and number 14 on the US Billboard Digital Albums chart. The album sold over 12,000 copies in its first week of release. Eyes Wide Open produced two singles, "We'll Be the Stars", released on January 13, 2015, and the title-track "Eyes Wide Open", released on April 7, 2015.

== Background and recording ==
Carpenter became heavily involved with the Disney Channel in 2013, making various appearances on soundtracks like "Smile" for the album Disney Fairies: Faith, Trust, and Pixie Dust and "All You Need", featured on the Sofia the First soundtrack. In that same year, Carpenter signed a record deal with Hollywood Records to release her own music. Carpenter was planning to launch an EP and then release a studio album. She released her debut EP Can't Blame a Girl for Trying with four tracks in March 2014.

== Music and lyrics ==
The track listing for Eyes Wide Open contains twelve tracks; including four tracks previously included on Carpenter's debut EP Can't Blame a Girl for Trying. The album is a folk-pop and teen pop record, full of acoustic and country styles. It embodies influences of pop rock, power pop and Hawaiian folk. In all of the songs Carpenter talks about personal experiences, friendship, love and teenage problems. Four songs were written by Carpenter.

Eyes Wide Open begins with the title track “Eyes Wide Open”. The song demonstrates a "darker mood" where Carpenter sings about finding who she is and her path. Her favorite lyric on the album is the opening lyric of “Eyes Wide Open” that says "Everybody loves to tell me / I was born an old soul." "Can't Blame a Girl for Trying" is an acoustic guitar-pop folk song who talks the being foolish in love and making mistakes, but never blaming those who make them. According to Carpenter the song "perfectly describes a thirteen-year-old girl and a teenage girl." The third track, "The Middle of Starting Over" has country pop influences. The song talks about moving on, start all over again and forget the mistakes. "The Middle of Starting Over" was compared to Taylor Swift's work in her early albums.

The last song of Carpenter's new material, "Darling I'm a Mess", was the first song to be recorded for Eyes Wide Open. The Hawaiian folk song was co-written by Meghan Trainor and lyrically, it talks about the feeling of being friend-zoned. A folk-pop guitar-driven ballad, "White Flag" talks about changes in our daily life and that none of the bad things we do will last forever. The last track of the record, "Best Thing I Got" is a piano driven-pop song with jazz influences. Lyrically, the song talks about love and "being a non-perfect girl who wants life to be full of freedom.”

== Singles ==
The album's lead single, "We'll Be the Stars", was released on January 13, 2015. It made its radio premiere via Radio Disney a day earlier.

Carpenter made the lead track off of the album, "Eyes Wide Open", available for those who pre-ordered the album on iTunes on April 7, 2015. It was released as the album's second single, with the music video premiering on June 14, 2015. In 2016, the song won the Radio Disney Music Award for "Best Anthem".

== Critical reception ==
Writing for the website Headline Planet, Brian Cantor gave the album a positive review, focusing on the emotion conveyed by Sabrina Carpenter's performance. He wrote, "Decidedly loose in construct but rich in personality, Eyes Wide Open provides Carpenter with an opportunity to establish her own identity and leave her own mark." Cantor believed the more heavily produced songs put Carpenter at a disadvantage, playing against her strengths. In particular, he singled out "Eyes Wide Open" and "We'll Be the Stars" as weaker songs on the album that do not showcase Carpenter's talents and personality to their full potential. "With every passing moment–even on her weaker tracks–" Cantor wrote, "Carpenter creates distance between the conception and reality of a teen artist." Taylor Weatherby of Billboard praised ""We'll Be the Stars" as one of Carpenter's best songs by saying "Though Carpenter's voice is clearly great for dancer tracks, this track from her first album shows the vulnerable side to her sound – and it's just as awesome as the more upbeat tunes."

== Chart performance ==
The album debuted at number 43 on the US Billboard 200, number 31 on the US Billboard Top Album Sales chart, and number 14 on the US Billboard Digital Albums chart. According to Billboard and Nielsen SoundScan, the album sold over 12,000 album-equivalent units in its first week release.

== Track listing ==
Eyes Wide Open track listing
No.	Title	Writer(s)	Producer(s)	Length
1.	"Eyes Wide Open"	Jerrod Bettis; Audra Mae; Meghan Kabir	Mitch Allan; Bettis; Dan Book^{[a]}	3:12
2.	"Can't Blame a Girl for Trying"	Meghan Trainor; Al Anderson; Chris Gelbuda	Brian Malouf	2:49
3.	"The Middle of Starting Over"	Jim McGorman; Robb Vallier; Michelle Moyer	Malouf; McGorman^{[b]}; Vallier^{[b]}	3:32
4.	"We'll Be the Stars"	Skyler Stonestreet; Cameron Walker; Steven Solomon	Solomon	3:06
5.	"Two Young Hearts"	Ben Berger; Mae; Ryan McMahon	Captain Cuts	3:53
6.	"Your Love's Like"	Matthew Tishler; Philip Bentley; Lindsey Lee; Sabrina Carpenter	Tishler	3:29
7.	"Too Young"	Carpenter; Jon Ingoldsby	Ingoldsby	4:14
8.	"Seamless"	Carpenter; Jon Levine; Chelsea Lena	Levine	3:06
9.	"Right Now"	Carpenter; Jordan Higgins; Lindsay Rush	Higgins; Rush^{[c]}	3:35
10.	"Darling I'm a Mess"	Trainor; Lily Harrington	Malouf	2:59
11.	"White Flag"	Cara Salimando; Scott Harris; Matt Squire	Squire; Steve Tippeconic^{[d]}; Harris^{[d]}	3:18
12.	"Best Thing I Got"	John Gordon; Julie Frost	Gordon; Frost^{[c]}	3:19
Total length:				40:32

Notes

- ^{^a}signifies an additional vocal producer
- ^{^b}signifies a co-producer
- ^{^c}signifies a vocal producer
- ^{^d}signifies an additional producer
- "The Middle of Starting Over" is a cover of the 2013 song of the same name, originally released by Michelle Moyer.
- "Best Thing I Got" is a cover of the 2012 song of the same name, originally released by Aya.

== Credits and personnel ==
Credits adapted from the liner notes of Eyes Wide Open.

Recorded, engineered, mixed and mastered at

- North Hollywood, California (The Guest House)
- Sherman Oaks, California (Cookie Jar Recording)
- Los Angeles, California (Sleepwalker Studios, Captain Cuts Studios, The Synagogue, SOMD Studio, The Lair)
- West Los Angeles, California (The Firestation)
- Gordon Studio DK
- Ojai, California (The Mastering Lab, Inc.)

Performers and production

- Sabrina Carpenter – vocals (all tracks); backing vocals (6)
- Eric Boulanger – mastering (all tracks)
- Mitch Allan – production, vocal production, guitar, bass, programming, backing vocals (1)
- Jerrod Bettis – production, additional engineering, programming (1)
- Tony Maserati – mixing (1)
- Scott Robinson – additional engineering (1)
- Dan Book – additional vocal production (1)
- Meghan Kabir – backing vocals (1)
- Brian Malouf – production, keyboards (2, 3, 10); mixing (2, 3, 9, 10); drum programming (2); additional percussion (10)
- Chris Thompson – engineering (2, 3)
- Jim McGorman – acoustic guitar, electric guitar, bass (2, 3); glockenspiel, hand percussion (2); co-production, piano, keyboards (3)
- Robb Valler – co-production, backing vocals (3)
- Marc Slutsky – drums (3)
- Daniel Kalisher – mandolin (3)
- Michelle Moyer – backing vocals (3)
- Steven Solomon – production, mixing (4)
- Captain Cuts – production, mixing (5)
- Matthew Tishler – production, piano, bass, programming (6)
- Vic Florencia – mixing (6)
- Justin Abedin – guitars (6)
- Greg Critchley – drums (6)
- Lindsey Lee – backing vocals (6)
- Jon Ingoldsby – production, mixing, all instruments (7)
- Sarah Carpenter – additional backing vocals (7); backing vocals (10)
- Jon Levine – production, mixing engineering, piano, organ, glockenspiel, bass, programming (8)
- Dan Piscina – engineering (8)
- Jon Sosin – guitar, ukulele (8)
- Jordan Higgins – production, engineering, vocal production, arrangement, all instruments, programming (9)
- Lindsay Rush – vocal production, arrangement (9)
- Aaron Sterling – drums, drum programming (10)
- Curt Schneider – bass (10)
- Michael Ward – guitars (10)
- Zac Rae – keyboards (10)
- Matt Squire – production, mixing, all instruments (11)
- Steve Tippeconic – additional production, all instruments (11)
- Scott Harris – additional production (11)
- Larry Goetz – all instruments, engineering (11)
- John Gordon – production, mixing, programming, guitars, piano, additional instruments (12)
- Sune Haansbaek – mixing, additional guitar (12)
- Julie Frost – vocal production (12)
- Kim Thomsen – drums (12)
- Mikkel Riber – bass (12)

Design

- Rebecca Miller – photography
- Anabel Sinn – art direction, design
- Enny Joo – art direction, design

== Charts ==
Chart (2015)	Peak position
France Downloads Albums (SNEP)	181
UK Download Albums (OCC)	93
US Billboard 200	43

== Release history ==
Region	Date	Format(s)	Label	Ref.
United States	April 14, 2015	CD; digital download; vinyl	Hollywood	
