= List of awards and nominations received by Sabrina Carpenter =

Sabrina Carpenter awards and nominations
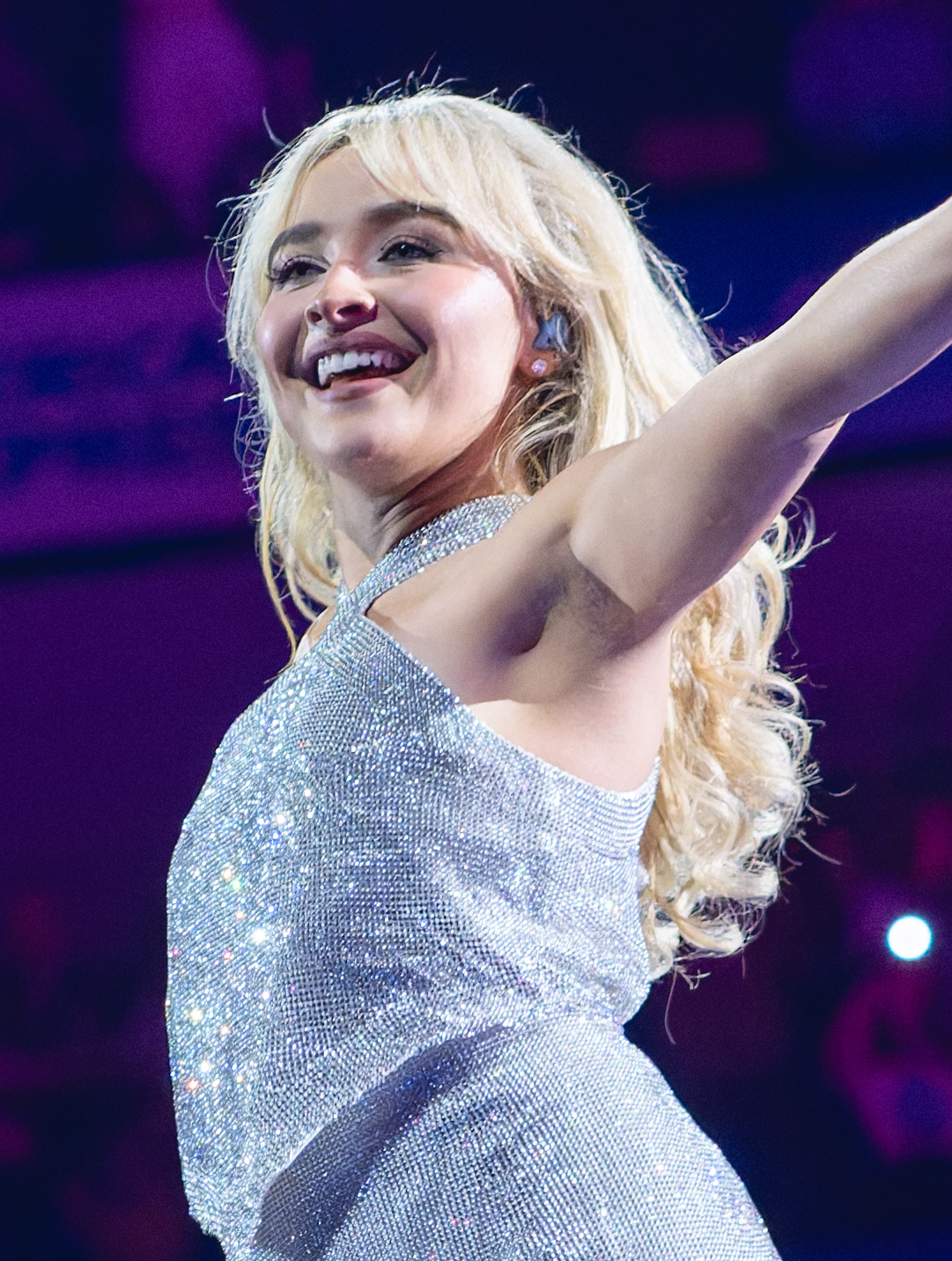
- Carpenter at the 2025 Primavera Sound
Awards and nominations
Award	Wins	Nominations
American Music Awards	3	13
Billboard Music Awards	0	9
Brit Awards	1	4
Grammy Awards	2	14
iHeartRadio Music Awards	3	20
Primetime Emmy Awards	1	1
MTV Video Music Awards	6	25
MTV Europe Music Awards	1	6

Totals (Note: Certain award groups do not simply award one winner. They acknowledge several different recipients, have runners-up, and have third place. Since this is a specific recognition and is different from losing an award, runner-up mentions are considered wins in this award tally. For simplification and to avoid errors, each award in this list has been presumed to have had a prior nomination.)
- Wins: 48
- Nominations: 151

The American singer, songwriter, and actress Sabrina Carpenter has won a total of 48 industry awards from 149 nominations throughout her career. She has received various accolades and awards and is a recipient of two Grammy Awards, an Emmy Award, three American Music Awards, three iHeartRadio Music Awards, and six MTV Video Music Awards, as well as nominations for Billboard Music Awards, and Teen Choice Awards.

She was included in the 2024 Time 100 Next list, which recognizes rising stars across industries.

Carpenter began her career as a child actress and rose to prominence with her role as Maya Hart in the Disney Channel series Girl Meets World (2014–2017). For her performance, she received nominations at the Teen Choice Awards and Kids’ Choice Awards while also being recognized for her vocal work on the show’s soundtrack. She later starred in the Disney Channel original movie Adventures in Babysitting (2016), which earned her additional fan-voted award nominations.

Carpenter achieved her mainstream music breakthrough with the release of her fifth studio album Emails I Can't Send (2022), which produced the viral single "Nonsense." The song won TikTok Bop of the Year at the 2024 iHeartRadio Music Awards. In 2024, her single "Espresso" became an international hit, earning her nominations at the Billboard Music Awards and the MTV Video Music Awards, with the latter for the Best Song of the Summer and Best New Artist categories.

As an actress, she served as the guest star in the Disney+ variety sketch special The Muppet Show (2026) as well as an executive producer for which she won a Primetime Emmy Award for Outstanding Variety Special (Pre-Recorded).

== Awards and nominations ==
Award	Year (Note: Indicates the year of ceremony. Each year is linked to the article about the awards held that year, wherever possible.)	Category	Nominee(s) / Work(s)	Result	Ref.
American Music Awards	2025	Artist of the Year	Herself	Nominated	
American Music Awards	2025	Favorite Female Pop Artist	Herself	Nominated	
American Music Awards	2025	Album of the Year	Short n' Sweet	Nominated	
American Music Awards	2025	Favorite Pop Album	Short n' Sweet	Nominated	
American Music Awards	2025	Song of the Year	"Espresso"	Nominated	
American Music Awards	2025	Favorite Pop Song	"Espresso"	Nominated	
American Music Awards	2026	Artist of the Year	Herself	Nominated	
American Music Awards	2026	Best Female Pop Artist	Herself	Won	
American Music Awards	2026	Album of the Year	Man's Best Friend	Won	
American Music Awards	2026	Best Pop Album	Man's Best Friend	Won	
American Music Awards	2026	Song of the Year	"Manchild"	Nominated	
American Music Awards	2026	Best Music Video	"Manchild"	Nominated	
American Music Awards	2026	Best Pop Song	"Manchild"	Nominated	
APRA Music Awards	2025	Most Performed International Work	"Espresso"	Nominated	
ARIA Music Awards	2025	Best International Artist	Herself	Nominated	
ARIA Music Awards	2026	Most Popular International Artist	Herself	Nominated	
Asian Pop Music Awards	2025	Global Artist Award	Herself	Nominated	
Berlin Music Video Awards	2026	Best Director	"Tears"	Nominated	
Billboard Music Awards	2024	Top Artist	"Espresso"	Nominated	
Billboard Music Awards	2024	Top Female Artist	"Espresso"	Nominated	
Billboard Music Awards	2024	Top Hot 100 Artist	"Espresso"	Nominated	
Billboard Music Awards	2024	Top Streaming Songs Artist	"Espresso"	Nominated	
Billboard Music Awards	2024	Top Radio Songs Artist	"Espresso"	Nominated	
Billboard Music Awards	2024	Top Billboard Global 200 Artist	"Espresso"	Nominated	
Billboard Music Awards	2024	Top Billboard Global (Excl. U.S.) Artist	"Espresso"	Nominated	
Billboard Music Awards	2024	Top Billboard Global 200 Song	"Espresso"	Nominated	
Billboard Music Awards	2024	Top Billboard Global (Excl. U.S.) Song	"Espresso"	Nominated	
BMI Pop Awards	2024	Most-Performed Songs of the Year	"Cupid" (Twin version)	Won	
BMI Pop Awards	2024	Most-Performed Songs of the Year	"Nonsense"	Won	
BMI Pop Awards	2025	Most-Performed Songs of the Year	"Espresso"	Won	
BMI Pop Awards	2025	Most-Performed Songs of the Year	"Feather"	Won	
BMI Pop Awards	2025	Most-Performed Songs of the Year	"Please Please Please"	Won	
BMI Pop Awards	2026	Songwriter of the Year	Herself	Won	
BMI Pop Awards	2026	Most-Performed Songs of the Year	"Bed Chem"	Won	
BMI Pop Awards	2026	Most-Performed Songs of the Year	"Busy Woman"	Won	
BMI Pop Awards	2026	Most-Performed Songs of the Year	"Good Graces"	Won	
BMI Pop Awards	2026	Most-Performed Songs of the Year	"Juno"	Won	
BMI Pop Awards	2026	Most-Performed Songs of the Year	"Manchild"	Won	
BMI Pop Awards	2026	Most-Performed Songs of the Year	"Taste"	Won	
BreakTudo Awards	2026	Global Artist	Herself	Pending	
BreakTudo Awards	2026	International Collaboration of the Year	"Bring Your Love" (with Madonna)	Pending	
Brit Awards	2025	International Artist of the Year	Herself	Nominated	
Brit Awards	2025	International Song of the Year	"Espresso"	Nominated	
Brit Awards	2025	Global Success Award	Herself	Won	
Brit Awards	2026	International Artist of the Year	Herself	Nominated	
Brit Awards	2026	International Song of the Year	"Manchild"	Nominated	
Danish Music Awards	2024	International Hit of the Year	"Espresso"	Won	
FiFi Awards (United States)	2024	Fragrance of the Year – Popular	"Sweet Tooth"	Finalist	
FiFi Awards (United Kingdom)	2025	Newcomer	"Sweet Tooth"	Won	
Filipino Music Awards	2025	People's Choice Awards: International Artist	Herself	Nominated	
Grammy Awards	2025	Record of the Year	"Espresso"	Nominated	
Grammy Awards	2025	Best Pop Solo Performance	"Espresso"	Won	
Grammy Awards	2025	Album of the Year	Short n' Sweet	Nominated	
Grammy Awards	2025	Best Pop Vocal Album	Short n' Sweet	Won	
Grammy Awards	2025	Song of the Year	"Please Please Please"	Nominated	
Grammy Awards	2025	Best New Artist	Herself	Nominated	
Grammy Awards	2026	Record of the Year	"Manchild"	Nominated	
Grammy Awards	2026	Song of the Year	"Manchild"	Nominated	
Grammy Awards	2026	Best Pop Solo Performance	"Manchild"	Nominated	
Grammy Awards	2026	Best Music Video	"Manchild"	Nominated	
Grammy Awards	2026	Album of the Year	Man's Best Friend	Nominated	
Grammy Awards	2026	Best Pop Vocal Album	Man's Best Friend	Nominated	
Grammy Awards	2027	Best Pop Duo/Group Performance	"Bring Your Love" (with Madonna)	Pending	
Grammy Awards	2027	Best Pop Duo/Group Performance	"The Life of a Showgirl" (with Taylor Swift)	Pending	
Hollywood Music Video Awards	2025	Music Video of the Year	"Taste"	Won	
Hollywood Music Video Awards	2025	Best Acting	"Taste"	Won	
Hollywood Music Video Awards	2025	Best Comedy	"Taste"	Won	
Hollywood Music Video Awards	2025	Best Hair & Makeup	"Taste"	Nominated	
Hollywood Music Video Awards	2025	Best Casting	"Taste"	Nominated	
Hollywood Music Video Awards	2025	Best Action & Stunts	"Taste"	Nominated	
Hollywood Music Video Awards	2025	Best Marketability	"Taste"	Nominated	
Hollywood Music Video Awards	2025	Best Editing	"Espresso"	Won	
Hollywood Music Video Awards	2025	Best Color Grading	"Espresso"	Nominated	
Hollywood Music Video Awards	2025	Best Pop	"Please Please Please"	Won	
Hollywood Music Video Awards	2025	Best Styling	"Please Please Please"	Nominated	
Hollywood Music Video Awards	2025	Best Narrative	"Please Please Please"	Nominated	
Hollywood Music Video Awards	2026	Best Pop	"Tears"	Won	
Hollywood Music Video Awards	2026	Best SciFi/Thriller/Horror	"Tears"	Nominated	
Hollywood Music Video Awards	2026	Best Online Virality	"Tears"	Nominated	
Hollywood Music Video Awards	2026	Best Production Design	"Tears"	Nominated	
Hollywood Music Video Awards	2026	Best Editing	"Tears"	Nominated	
Hollywood Music Video Awards	2026	Best Choreography	"Tears"	Nominated	
Hollywood Music Video Awards	2026	Music Video of the Year	"Tears"	Nominated	
iHeartRadio Music Awards	2019	Cutest Musician's Pet	Goodwin (Note: Her pet dog)	Nominated	
iHeartRadio Music Awards	2024	Favorite Tour Style	Short n' Sweet Tour	Nominated	
iHeartRadio Music Awards	2024	Best Lyrics	"Nonsense"	Nominated	
iHeartRadio Music Awards	2025	Artist of the Year	Herself	Nominated	
iHeartRadio Music Awards	2025	Pop Artist of the Year	Herself	Won	
iHeartRadio Music Awards	2025	Favorite Tour Style	Short n' Sweet Tour	Nominated	
iHeartRadio Music Awards	2025	Song of the Year	"Espresso"	Nominated	
iHeartRadio Music Awards	2025	Pop Song of the Year	"Espresso"	Won	
iHeartRadio Music Awards	2025	Best Lyrics	"Espresso"	Nominated	
iHeartRadio Music Awards	2025	Best Music Video	"Espresso"	Nominated	
iHeartRadio Music Awards	2025	Best Music Video	"Please Please Please"	Nominated	
iHeartRadio Music Awards	2025	Favorite Tour Tradition	"Juno" position	Nominated	
iHeartRadio Music Awards	2026	Song of the Year	"Manchild"	Nominated	
iHeartRadio Music Awards	2026	Pop Song of the Year	"Manchild"	Nominated	
iHeartRadio Music Awards	2026	Best Lyrics	"Manchild"	Nominated	
iHeartRadio Music Awards	2026	Best Music Video	"Manchild"	Nominated	
iHeartRadio Music Awards	2026	Artist of the Year	Herself	Nominated	
iHeartRadio Music Awards	2026	Pop Artist of the Year	Herself	Won	
iHeartRadio Music Awards	2026	Favorite Tour Style	Short n' Sweet Tour	Nominated	
iHeartRadio Music Awards	2026	Favorite Tour Tradition	Celebrity "Juno" Arrest	Nominated	
Los 40 Music Awards	2024	Best International Song	"Espresso"	Nominated	
Los 40 Music Awards	2024	Best International Artist	Herself	Nominated	
Los 40 Music Awards	2025	Best International Artist	Herself	Nominated	
MTV Europe Music Awards	2023	Biggest Fans	Herself	Nominated	
MTV Europe Music Awards	2024	Biggest Fans	Herself	Nominated	
MTV Europe Music Awards	2024	Best Artist	Herself	Nominated	
MTV Europe Music Awards	2024	Best Pop	Herself	Nominated	
MTV Europe Music Awards	2024	Best US Act	Herself	Nominated	
MTV Europe Music Awards	2024	Best Song	"Espresso"	Won	
MTV Video Music Awards	2024	Song of the Year	"Espresso"	Won	
MTV Video Music Awards	2024	Best Editing	"Espresso"	Nominated	
MTV Video Music Awards	2024	Best Direction	"Please Please Please"	Nominated	
MTV Video Music Awards	2024	Best Art Direction	"Please Please Please"	Nominated	
MTV Video Music Awards	2024	Song of Summer	"Please Please Please"	Nominated	
MTV Video Music Awards	2024	Artist of the Year	Herself	Nominated	
MTV Video Music Awards	2024	Best Pop	Herself	Nominated	
MTV Video Music Awards	2025	Best Pop Artist	Herself	Won	
MTV Video Music Awards	2025	Best Album	Short n' Sweet	Won	
MTV Video Music Awards	2025	Video of the Year	"Manchild"	Nominated	
MTV Video Music Awards	2025	Best Pop	"Manchild"	Nominated	
MTV Video Music Awards	2025	Best Direction	"Manchild"	Nominated	
MTV Video Music Awards	2025	Best Cinematography	"Manchild"	Nominated	
MTV Video Music Awards	2025	Best Editing	"Manchild"	Nominated	
MTV Video Music Awards	2025	Best Visual Effects	"Manchild"	Won	
MTV Video Music Awards	2025	Song of Summer	"Manchild"	Nominated	
MTV Video Music Awards	2026	Artist of the Year	Herself	Nominated	
MTV Video Music Awards	2026	Best Album	Man's Best Friend	Nominated	
MTV Video Music Awards	2026	Video of the Year	"Tears"	Nominated	
MTV Video Music Awards	2026	Song of the Year	"Bring Your Love" (with Madonna)	Nominated	
MTV Video Music Awards	2026	Best Collaboration	"Bring Your Love" (with Madonna)	Won	
MTV Video Music Awards	2026	Best Pop	"House Tour"	Nominated	
MTV Video Music Awards	2026	Best Direction	"House Tour"	Nominated	
MTV Video Music Awards	2026	Best Editing	"House Tour"	Won	
MTV Video Music Awards	2026	Song of Summer	"House Tour"	Nominated	
MTV Video Music Awards Japan	2026	Best Collaboration Video (International)	"Bring Your Love" (with Madonna)	Won	
Music Awards Japan	2026	Best International Pop Song in Japan	"Manchild"	Nominated	
Music Awards Japan	2026	Best of Listeners' Choice: International Song	"Manchild"	Nominated	
Music Awards Japan	2026	Best of Listeners' Choice: International Song	"Tears"	Nominated	
Myx Music Awards	2024	Global Video of the Year	"Espresso"	Won	
Nickelodeon Kids' Choice Awards	2024	Favorite Ticket of the Year	Emails I Can't Send Tour	Nominated	
Nickelodeon Kids' Choice Awards	2024	Favorite Viral Song	"Espresso"	Won	
Nickelodeon Kids' Choice Awards	2025	Favorite Female Breakout Artist	Herself	Won	
Nickelodeon Kids' Choice Awards	2025	Favorite Song	"Taste"	Won	
Nickelodeon Kids' Choice Awards	2025	Favorite Album	Short n' Sweet	Won	
Nickelodeon Kids' Choice Awards	2025	Favorite Music Collaboration	"Please Please Please" (with Dolly Parton)	Nominated	
Nickelodeon Kids' Choice Awards	2026	Favorite Music Collaboration	"Bring Your Love" (with Madonna)	Nominated	
Nickelodeon Kids' Choice Awards	2026	Favorite Music Collaboration	"The Life of a Showgirl" (with Taylor Swift)	Nominated	
Nickelodeon Kids' Choice Awards	2026	Favorite Song	"Manchild"	Nominated	
Nickelodeon Kids' Choice Awards	2026	Favorite Album	Man's Best Friend	Nominated	
Nickelodeon Kids' Choice Awards	2026	Favorite Female Artist	Herself	Nominated	
NRJ Music Award	2024	International Hit of the Year	"Espresso"	Nominated	
NRJ Music Award	2025	International Female Artist of the Year	Herself	Nominated	
Pollstar Awards	2025	New Headliner of the Year	Herself	Nominated	
Pollstar Awards	2026	Major Tour of the Year	Short n' Sweet Tour	Nominated	
Pollstar Awards	2026	Pop Tour of the Year	Short n' Sweet Tour	Nominated	
Primetime Emmy Awards	2026	Outstanding Variety Special (Pre-Recorded)	The Muppet Show	Won	
Radio Disney Music Awards	2015	Best Crush Song	"Can't Blame a Girl for Trying"	Won	
Radio Disney Music Awards	2016	Best Anthem	"Eyes Wide Open"	Won	
Radio Disney Music Awards	2017	Best Crush Song	"On Purpose"	Nominated	
Radio Disney Music Awards	2018	Best Crush Song	"Why"	Nominated	
SCAD Savannah Film Festival	2019	Best Performance	Herself	Won	
UK Music Video Awards	2025	Best Pop Video – International	"Manchild"	Won	
UK Music Video Awards	2025	Best Performance in a Video	"Manchild"	Nominated	
UK Music Video Awards	2025	Best Production Design in a Video	"Manchild"	Nominated	
UK Music Video Awards	2025	Best Cinematography in a Video	"Manchild"	Nominated	
UK Music Video Awards	2026	Best Pop Video – International	"Tears"	Nominated	
Variety Hitmakers Awards	2023	Rising Star Award	Herself	Won	
Variety Hitmakers Awards	2025	Hitmaker of the Year	Herself	Won	
Webby Awards	2025	Best Individual Performance – Video & Film	"What a Girl Wants" (with Christina Aguilera)	Nominated	
Webby Awards	2026	Music Video – Video & Film (People's Voice)	Tears	Won	

== Other accolades ==
=== World records ===
List of world records achieved by Sabrina Carpenter
Publication	Year	World record	R. status	Ref.
Guinness World Records	2024	First female artist to occupy the Top 3 of the UK Official Singles Chart simultaneously	Record	
Guinness World Records	2024	Most Weeks at No.1 on the UK's Singles Chart in a Calendar Year (Female)	Record	
Guinness World Records	2025	First international artist to win the Global Success award at the BRIT Awards	Record	
