= Daddy's Little Girls =

- Theatrical release poster
- Directed by: Tyler Perry
- Written by: Tyler Perry
- Produced by: Tyler Perry; Reuben Cannon
- Starring: Gabrielle Union; Idris Elba; Louis Gossett Jr.; Tracee Ellis Ross
- Cinematography: Toyomichi Kurita
- Edited by: Maysie Hoy
- Music by: Brian McKnight
- Production companies: Tyler Perry Studios; Reuben Cannon Productions
- Distributed by: Lionsgate
- Release date: February 14, 2007
- Running time: 95 minutes
- Country: United States
- Language: English
- Budget: $10 million
- Box office: $31.6 million

Daddy's Little Girls is a 2007 American romantic comedy drama film written and directed by Tyler Perry, produced by Perry and Reuben Cannon, and starring Gabrielle Union, Idris Elba, Louis Gossett Jr., and Tracee Ellis Ross. It tells the story of a lawyer who helps a mechanic in a custody battle against his mean-spirited ex-wife over who will get custody of their daughters.

Daddy's Little Girls was released on February 14, 2007 by Lions Gate Entertainment. This is the first film directed by Perry that he does not appear in, as well as the first of Perry's films to not be based on any of the filmmaker's stage plays.

== Plot ==
In Edgewood, Atlanta, Monty James is a well-liked mechanic working for Willie, who dreams of owning his own shop. His three daughters, Sierra, Lauryn, and China, live with their maternal grandmother, Kat, but Monty visits regularly and provides financial support. Before her death, Kat asks Monty to take custody of them since her disowned daughter, Monty's ex-wife Jennifer, barely has any interest in the girls, caring more about her live-in drug dealer boyfriend Joe.

Following Kat's funeral, Jennifer arrives with Joe and his thugs. She tries to physically take the girls from Monty, but her aunt Rita steps in. She leaves, telling Monty she intends to seek full custody of the girls.

To earn extra money, Monty accepts a job as a driver for attorney Julia Rossmore at the recommendation of his next-door neighbor Maya. One night, after Julia’s friends, Brenda and Cynthia set her up on a blind date with Byron, Monty has to work later than expected. While driving her home, Monty receives a call that his children were involved in a house fire. So he immediately heads to the hospital without telling Julia, who fires him.

When Monty arrives at the hospital, it is revealed that Sierra accidentally started a fire and that the girls were home alone with no adult supervision until Maya rescued them. Social Services representative Laurie Bell gives immediate temporary custody to Jennifer. Meanwhile, the girls face constant abuse and neglect from Joe and Jennifer. Monty is called to Sierra's school after she is caught with drugs. Sierra explains that Joe and Jennifer are forcing her to sell drugs, threatening to hurt Monty if she refuses. Aware that Joe can afford a high-powered attorney for the custody hearing, Monty goes to Julia for help, but she turns him away, assuming he only wants the girls to get government assistance.

On Monty’s custody hearing day, Julia leaves for a different courtroom and overhears his failing attempt to represent himself. After listening to Monty try to inform the judge that the girls are living with a drug dealer, Julia agrees to represent him. Monty takes her to the jazz club in his neighborhood for her birthday, where they drink and dance with his friends. Over the next few weeks, Monty and Julia develop romantic feelings for each other. Julia runs into Brenda, who had met Monty before, and discovers they are now a couple. Brenda pulls Julia to the side and berates her for dating beneath her status.

After being injured in a robbery, Willie decides to retire and offers to sell the shop to Monty and he accepts his offer. At the child custody hearing, Julia argues that it would be in the children's best interest for Monty to be awarded custody and provides the court with a written statement from Kat. Jennifer's lawyer counters by claiming that Monty is not suitable to raise the girls due to a conviction of statutory rape that occurred 16 years prior. Julia feels betrayed, stops representing him, and leaves.

Monty's daughters arrive at his house and inform him that Joe has been beating China. While his daughters are asleep, a livid Monty drives off and crashes into Jennifer and Joe's car, dragging Joe out of his car and brutally beating him. As Joe's thugs attack Monty, Aunt Rita, Willie, and the other neighbors rush to his defense and fight Joe's thugs as the police arrive. Julia sees a news report about the near-riot and rushes to help Monty after she learns from the report that he’d been wrongfully convicted of the rape charges.

Jennifer and Joe face drug charges and the neighbors testify against Jennifer, Joe, and his thugs. The judge has them taken into custody with no bond. Monty is charged with assaulting Joe. Julia walks in to represent him while apologizing for not hearing his side of the story. The witnesses refuse to testify against Monty, so the judge dismisses the case.

After Jennifer and Joe are arrested, Monty's daughters greet him and Julia at the auto shop which Monty now owns. As he, Julia, and his daughters enter the auto shop, the rest of the neighborhood celebrates Monty's release.

== Cast ==
- Idris Elba as Monty James, a loving, hard-working, and well-liked mechanic with three daughters who dreams of owning his own garage
  - Aaron Momon as young Monty James
- Gabrielle Union as Julia Rossmore, a lawyer and Monty's love interest who struggles to find a decent boyfriend
- Louis Gossett Jr. as Willie, Monty's elderly boss, best friend, and mechanic
- Tracee Ellis Ross as Cynthia, Julia's colleague and friend who sets Julia up on blind dates
- Tasha Smith as Jennifer Jackson, Monty's selfish, drug-dealing ex-wife who is bent on getting custody of their three daughters.
- Malinda Williams as Maya, Monty's next-door neighbor and Julia's personal assistant
- Terri J. Vaughn as Brenda, Julia's lawyer friend who despises Monty
- Gary Sturgis as Joe, Jennifer's gangster boyfriend and drug dealer who has the neighborhood in fear
- Cassi Davis as Rita Jackson, Jennifer's disowned aunt and one of Monty's neighbors
- Sierra Aylina McClain as Sierra James, Monty's oldest daughter
- Lauryn Alisa McClain as Lauryn James, Monty's middle daughter
- China Anne McClain as China James, Monty's youngest daughter
- Juanita Jennings as Kat Jackson, Jennifer's disowned mother and Rita's sister who dies in the beginning of the film from cancer
- LaVan Davis as Lester, a friend of Monty that works in a bar as the lead singer of a band
- Craig Robinson as Byron, a low-class, loud-mouthed, middle-aged rapper
- Maria Howell as Christopher's wife
- Rochelle Dewberry as Miss Rochelle
- Bob Banks as Mr. Jones
- Donna Biscoe as Laurie Bell, a representative of the Department of Social Services
- Eddie Long as himself
- Leland L. Jones as a district attorney
- Bennet Guillory as Principal
- Joey Nappo as Player #1
- Arvell Poe as Player #2
- Javon Johnson as Brenda's Husband
- Mark Oliver as Jennifer's lawyer who represents her in the custody battle
- Dan Albright as a judge that previously oversaw Monty's trial who is seen in a flashback
- Dan Beasley as a family court judge that oversees the custody battle between Monty and Joe
- Greyson Chadwick as Amanda, a girl that Monty was falsely accused of raping
- Ric Reitz as Amanda's father who had Monty arrested for supposedly raping his daughter but the mistake would be Monty's false belief in his innocence.
- Joan Pringle as a civil court judge that oversees the case against Joe which is dismissed due to lack of witnesses
- E. Roger Mitchell as Joe's criminal lawyer
- Giulia Pagano as a criminal judge that oversees the cases against Monty and Joe, Jennifer, and Joe's thugs following a near-riot in the Edgewood community
- Brian J. White as Christopher (uncredited)

== Reception ==
=== Box office ===
The film opened at #5 on Valentine's Day 2007 behind Ghost Rider, Bridge to Terabithia, Norbit's second weekend, and Music and Lyrics, and has grossed $31,609,243 worldwide, making it Tyler Perry's lowest-grossing film.

=== Critical reaction ===
On Rotten Tomatoes the film holds an approval rating of 25% based on 53 reviews. The site's critical consensus reads: "Daddy's Little Girls boasts fine performances and a poignant message, but is ultimately let down by amateurish filmmaking." Metacritic assigned the film a weighted average score of 49 out of 100, based on 17 critics, indicating "mixed or average" reviews. Audiences polled by CinemaScore gave the film an average grade of "A−" on an A+ to F scale.

== Soundtrack ==
Atlantic Records released Music inspired by the film: Tyler Perry's Daddy's Little Girls, in stores and online on January 16, 2007. Among the highlights of the album is "Family First," the first-ever recording by the Houston Family -- Whitney Houston, Dionne Warwick, and Cissy Houston. The song "Can't Let You Go" by Anthony Hamilton is not on the soundtrack. Also, the song "Beautiful" by Meshell Ndegeocello is featured in the movie.

1. Anthony Hamilton featuring Jaheim and Musiq Soulchild - "Struggle No More (The Main Event)"
2. R. Kelly - "Don't Let Go"
3. Tamika Scott of "Xscape" - "Greatest Gift"
4. Adrian Hood - "Brown Eyed Blues"
5. Whitney Houston, Cissy Houston, Dionne Warwick and The Family - "Family First"
6. Yolanda Adams - "Step Aside"
7. Brian McKnight - "I Believe"
8. Beyoncé - "Daddy"
9. Anthony Hamilton - "Struggle No More"
10. Governor - "Blood, Sweat & Tears"
11. Charles "Gator" Moore - "A Change Is Gonna Come"

Walmart exclusive

12. 3McClainGirls - "Daddy's Girl"
