= Can't Blame a Girl for Trying =

2014 EP by Sabrina Carpenter

EP by Sabrina Carpenter
- Released: April 8, 2014
- Recorded: 2013–2014
- Studios: SOMD (Los Angeles, California); Gordon Studio DK
- Genre: Teen pop
- Length: 12:58
- Label: Hollywood
- Producers: Brian Malouf; Jim McGorman; Robb Vallier; Matt Squire; Steve Tippeconic; Scott Harris; John Gordon; Julie Frost

Sabrina Carpenter chronology
Can't Blame a Girl for Trying (2014)	Eyes Wide Open (2015)

Singles from Can't Blame a Girl for Trying
- 1. "Can't Blame a Girl for Trying" Released: March 14, 2014

Can't Blame a Girl for Trying is the debut extended play (EP) by American singer Sabrina Carpenter. It was released by Hollywood Records on April 8, 2014. The EP peaked at number 16 on the US Billboard Heatseekers charts.

== Background and release ==
Prior to 2012, Carpenter began releasing various independent promotional singles. She became heavily involved with The Walt Disney Company in 2012, starring in the Disney Channel series Girl Meets World, and making various appearances on Disney soundtracks, including that for Disney Fairies: Faith, Trust and Pixie Dust and the soundtrack to Sofia the First. In 2013, Carpenter signed a five album record deal with Disney-owned Hollywood Records.

On March 14, 2014, Carpenter released her debut single "Can't Blame a Girl for Trying". The song was co-written by American singer Meghan Trainor who had previously recorded the song for her album Title (2015) and performed it at the Durango Songwriter's Expo in 2012.

== Content and music ==
"Can't Blame a Girl for Trying"
A 25-second sample of the chorus of "Can't Blame a Girl for Trying", an acoustic guitar-driven midtempo folk pop song with pop influences.

The EP begins with the title track, described by Carpenter as a song about being foolishly in love that "perfectly described being a 13-year-old girl and being a teenage girl". The song is followed by "The Middle of Starting Over", which was compared to Taylor Swift's work.

== Promotion ==
"Can't Blame a Girl for Trying" was released as the lead single from the EP on March 14, 2014. The song premiered a day earlier on Radio Disney. The music video premiered on March 28 and won a Radio Disney Music Award for Best Crush Song.

"The Middle of Starting Over" received a lyric video on August 19, 2014 composed of various scenes of her playing with her sister, Sarah Carpenter, before an official music video premiered on September 21.

Carpenter performed both songs at the 2014 Radio Disney Music Awards. She also performed acoustic versions of both songs on Perez TV in September 2014.

== Critical reception ==
Upon release, the EP garnered generally positive responses. Dolph Malone of Headline Planet praised the EP "from a marketing standpoint", praising the song "Can't Blame a Girl for Trying" which was co-written by Meghan Trainor, calling it "even more valuable from a musical standpoint". She added that the song Trainor wrote "possesses the same self-awareness and same intimate, conversational approach that fuels Trainor's own hits". Billboard writer Monique Melendez praised the lyrical content of the EP and their relatability to Carpenter's generation. A Kid's Point of You writer Anna Marie praised Carpenter's "flawless" vocals, opining that the EP has an "undeniably sophisticated edge, and an effortless ability to inspire listeners".

=== Accolades ===
Award	Recipient	Year	Category	Result	Ref.
Radio Disney Music Awards	"Can't Blame a Girl for Trying"	2015	"XOXO – Best Crush Song"	Won	

== Commercial performance ==
Upon release, the EP peaked at number 16 on the US Billboard Heatseekers charts, earning 12,000 album-equivalent units.

== Track listing ==
No.	Title	Writer(s)	Producer(s)	Length
1.	"Can't Blame a Girl for Trying"	Meghan Trainor; Al Anderson; Chris Gelbuda	Brian Malouf	2:49
2.	"The Middle of Starting Over"	Jim McGorman; Robb Vallier; Michelle Moyer	Malouf; McGorman^{[a]}; Vallier^{[a]}	3:32
3.	"White Flag"	Cara Salimando; Scott Harris; Matt Squire	Squire; Steve Tippeconic^{[b]}; Harris^{[b]}	3:18
4.	"Best Thing I Got"	John Gordon; Julie Frost	Gordon; Frost^{[c]}	3:19
Total length:				12:58

Notes

- ^{^[a]} signifies a co-producer
- ^{^[b]} signifies an additional producer
- ^{^[c]} signifies a vocal producer
- "The Middle of Starting Over" is a cover of the 2013 song of the same name, originally released by Michelle Moyer.
- "Best Thing I Got" is a cover of the 2012 song of the same name, originally released by Aya.

== Credits and personnel ==
Credits adapted from the liner notes of Can't Blame a Girl for Trying.

=== Studios ===
- Sherman Oaks, California (Cookie Jar Recording)
- Los Angeles, California (SOMD Studio, The Lair)
- Gordon Studio DK
- Bernie Grundman Mastering

=== Production ===
- Sabrina Carpenter – vocals (all tracks)
- Brian Gardner – mastering (all tracks)
- Brian Malouf – drum programming (1); production, mixing, keyboards (1, 2)
- Chris Thompson – engineering (1, 2)
- Jim McGorman – glockenspiel, hand percurssion (1); acoustic guitar, electric guitar, bass (1, 2); co-production, piano, keyboards (2)
- Robb Valler – co-production, backing vocals (2)
- Marc Slutsky – drums (2)
- Daniel Kalisher – mandolin (2)
- Michelle Moyer – backing vocals (2)
- Matt Squire – production, mixing, all instruments (3)
- Steve Tippeconic – additional production, all instruments (3)
- Scott Harris – additional production (3)
- Larry Goetz – all instruments, engineering (3)
- John Gordon – production, mixing, programming, guitars, piano, additional instruments (4)
- Sune Haansbaek – mixing, additional guitar (4)
- Julie Frost – vocal production (4)
- Kim Thomsen – drums (4)
- Mikkel Riber – bass (4)

=== Design ===
- Rebecca Miller – photography
- Anabel Sinn – art direction, design
- Enny Joo – art direction
- Dave Snow - creative director

== Charts ==
Chart (2014–2015)	Peak position
US Heatseekers Albums (Billboard)	16

== Release history ==
Region	Date	Format(s)	Label
United States	April 8, 2014	CD; digital download	Hollywood
