= Eyes Wide Open (Sabrina Carpenter song) =

Single by Sabrina Carpenter

from the album Eyes Wide Open
- Released: April 7, 2015
- Recorded: 2014–2015
- Studio: The Guest House (North Hollywood, California)
- Genre: Pop rock
- Length: 3:13
- Label: Hollywood
- Songwriters: Jerrod Bettis; Audra Mae; Meghan Kabir
- Producer: Jerrod Bettis

Sabrina Carpenter singles chronology
"We'll Be the Stars" (2015)	"Eyes Wide Open" (2015)	"Smoke and Fire" (2016)

Music video
- "Eyes Wide Open" on YouTube

"Eyes Wide Open" is a song recorded by American singer Sabrina Carpenter from her debut studio album of the same name (2015), served as the opening track of the album. The track was written by Audra Mae, Meghan Kabir, and its producer Jerrod Bettis. Mitch Allan helped Bettis on the production and produced the vocals while Dan Book served as an additional vocal producer. The song was released by Hollywood Records as the second single from Eyes Wide Open, made available for purchase a week before the album's release on April 7, 2015. "Eyes Wide Open" is a midtempo and power pop-influenced pop rock song with a piano and simple bass beat. In the song, Carpenter talks about finding who she is and finding her path. According to Carpenter, the song is her favorite on the album.

It was accompanied by a music video directed by Sarah McClung, which premiered on her Vevo channel on June 14, 2015. It featured Carpenter walking through an unknown building and performing the song in a room with her band and her sister Sarah Carpenter. Carpenter promoted "Eyes Wide Open" with several live performances, including at the Radio Disney Music Awards 2015, where she did a medley with her single "We'll Be the Stars". The song won a Radio Disney Music Award in the category "Best Anthem" in 2016.

== Background and recording ==
Carpenter made the lead track from the album available for those who pre-ordered the album on iTunes on April 7, 2015. The song was one of the last to be recorded, when Carpenter started to learn who she really was and when she wanted something more soulful for her album, which is the reason why the song is different from the rest of the record. In an interview with Justine Magazine, Carpenter said that "Eyes Wide Open" was her favorite track of the album.

"Eyes Wide Open" was written sometime in late 2014 and early 2015 by Jerrod Bettis, Audra Mae and Meghan Kabir. The song was produced by Bettis and Mitch Allan, the last one served as a vocal producer and Dan Book served as an additional vocal producer. Tony Maserati mixed the track and the recording session took place at The Guest House, located in North Hollywood, California. Bettis and Scott Robinson served as additional engineers. The track was programmed by Allan and Bettis and Allan plays guitars and bass. Kabir and Allan contributed backing vocals to the track. The song was mastered by Eric Boulanger at The Mastering Lab, Inc., located in Ojai, California.

== Composition and lyrical interpretation ==
"Eyes Wide Open"
A 27-second sample of the chorus of "Eyes Wide Open", a midtempo and pop rock song with power pop elements

Musically, "Eyes Wide Open" is a three minutes and thirteen seconds piano-driven midtempo and pop rock song with power pop elements. In terms of music notation, "Eyes Wide Open" was composed using 4/4 common time in the key of F minor, with a moderate tempo of 88 beats per minute. The song follows the chord progression of Fm–D♭-A♭ and Carpenter's vocal range spans from the low note A♭_{3} to the high note of E♭_{5}, giving the song one octave and four notes of range. The production of the song is backed by catchy background vocals, a piano and a simple bass beat. In the chorus, the song gain guitars and percussion elements.

Lyrically, the song demonstrates a "darker mood" where Carpenter sings about finding who she is and her path. Carpenter's favorite lyric of her debut studio album is the opening lyric of "Eyes Wide Open" that says "Everybody loves to tell me / I was born an old soul", which means Carpenter likes things from another time period. The song proceeds with the line "Better keep my eyes wide open / There's so much that I don't know" where Carpenter is singing about keeping her mind and eyes open and don't miss any opportunities. In the chorus, "I keep my eyes wide open / Bless this ground unbroken / I’m about to make my way / Heaven help me keep my faith / And my eyes wide open", Carpenter is asking for guidance and faith. In the second verse, the line "This dream burns inside of me / And I can’t just let it go", Carpenter decides to keep on going albeit with caution.

== Accolades ==
Awards and nominations
Organization	Year	Category	Result	Ref.
Radio Disney Music Awards	2016	"That's My Jam – Best Anthem"	Won	

== Music video ==
=== Background and release ===
The music video was directed by Sarah McColgan and it was premiered on Vevo and YouTube on June 14, 2015. The behind the scenes of the music video was premiered on July 17, 2015 on the same platforms and it features her sister Sarah Carpenter. A lyric video was premiered on YouTube on July 29, 2015 and it features various scenes of California streets.

== Critical reception ==
Taylor Weatherby of Billboard pointed ""Eyes Wide Open" as one of Carpenter's best songs by saying "[...] "Eyes Wide Open" served as her declaration of independence that showed the world she was ready for what was to come despite her young age. The lyrics in themselves are powerful enough ("All I have is just this moment / And I don't want to miss a second / 'Cause it could all be gone in an instant"), but with the anthemic beat she put behind it, Carpenter seems unstoppable with this track."

== Live performances ==
"Eyes Wide Open" was first performed on Radio Disney Music Awards 2015, where she did a medley with her single "We'll Be the Stars". She performed the song at D23 Expo in 2015 along with "Take on the World", "Can't Blame a Girl for Trying", a cover of "FourFiveSeconds", "The Middle of Starting Over" and "We'll Be the Stars". The song was also performed on YTV Summer Beach Bash II, in August, 2015. In 2016, Carpenter performed the song on the Honda Stage at the iHeartRadio Theater LA along with some covers and songs from her first and second album. The song was part of her debut headline tour, being the fifteenth song to be performed. The song was included on The De-Tour being the thirteenth song to be performed.

== Credits and personnel ==
Credits were adapted from Eyes Wide Open's liner notes.

=== Recording and management ===
- Recorded at The Guest House (North Hollywood, California)
- Mastered at The Mastering Lab, Inc. (Ojai, California)
- WB Music Corp. (ASCAP), Margetts Road Music (ASCAP) and Asternaut (ASCAP) All Rights obo Itself and Margetts Road Music and Asternaut administered by WB Music Corp., WB Music Corp. (ASCAP) and AMAEB (ASCAP) All Rights obo Itself and AMAEB administered by WB Music Corp., Songs Music Publishing LLC obo SHAHNAZ Publishing and Songs of SMP (ASCAP)

=== Personnel ===
- Sabrina Carpenter – lead vocals
- Jerrod Bettis – songwriting, production, additional engineering, drum programming
- Audra Mae – songwriting
- Meghan Kabir – songwriting, backing vocals
- Mitch Allan – production, vocal production, guitars, bass, programming, backing vocals
- Dan Book – additional vocal production
- Scott Robinson – additional engineering
- Tony Maserati – mixing
- Eric Boulanger – mastering

== Certifications ==
Region	Certification	Certified units/sales
Brazil (Pro-Música Brasil)	Gold	30,000^{‡}
United States (RIAA)	Gold	500,000^{‡}
^{‡} Sales+streaming figures based on certification alone.

== Release history ==
Country	Date	Format	Ref.
Various	April 7, 2015	Digital download	
