= Thriii =

American girl group

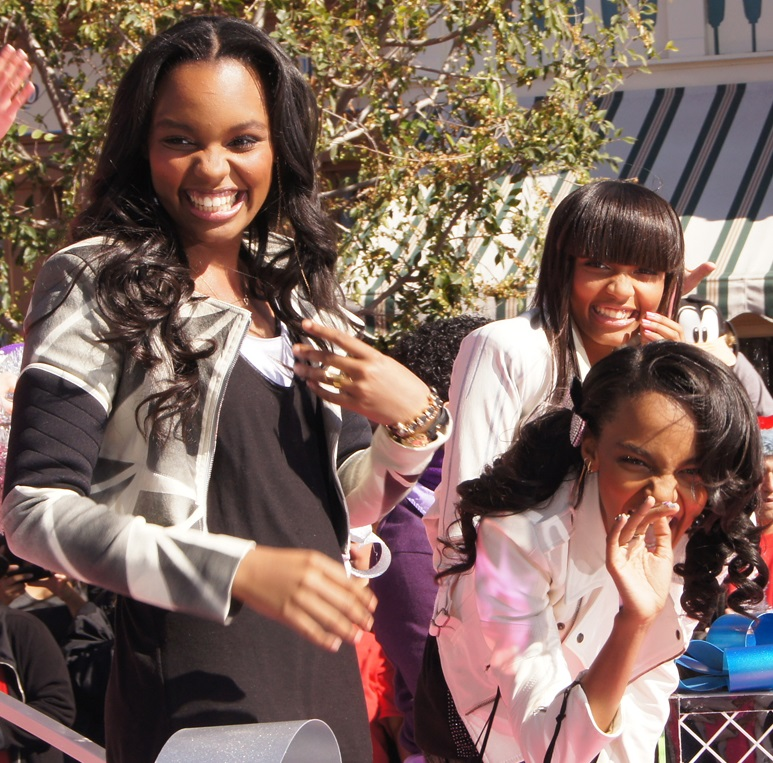
- Thriii performing at the 2011 Disney Parks Christmas Day Parade, from left to right: Sierra McClain, China Anne McClain, and Lauryn McClain

Background information
- Also known as: McClain; McClain Sisters; 3mcclaingirls
- Origin: Decatur, Georgia, U.S.
- Genres: R&B; pop
- Years active: 2005–present
- Label: Hollywood (2011–13)
- Members: China Anne McClain; Sierra McClain; Lauryn McClain

Thriii (pronounced "three") is an American girl group that was formed in 2005 by the sisters China Anne McClain, Sierra McClain, and Lauryn McClain. The group was also known as 3mcclaingirls in 2005–2009, McClain Sisters in 2010–2014 and just McClain in 2014–2015.

All three sisters starred in the film Daddy's Little Girls (2007), for which they released the single "Daddy's Girl". They signed with Hollywood Records in 2011 and were the opening act for Big Time Rush on their Better with U Tour in Houston, but left the record label in 2013 without having an album released. In June 2020 the group debuted with a new name, Thriii, and released their single "My Sanity".

== Early life ==
Sierra Aylina McClain was born on March 16, 1994, Lauryn McClain was born on January 9, 1997, and China Anne McClain was born on August 25, 1998. All three sisters were born and raised in Decatur, Georgia. The sisters grew up watching Disney films and musical classics, and they come from an artistic and musical family. Their father, Michael McClain, is a music producer who produced Solange Knowles' debut album Solo Star (2002). Their mother, Shontell McClain (née Rucker), is a songwriter and former screenwriter. The sisters also have a little brother, Gabriel McClain, who was born on April 17, 2001.

In 2004, the sisters became interested in music when they watched their father write and produce songs. The girls began to write songs, choreograph, and dance. In addition to acting, singing, and dancing, all three sisters can play the guitar, bass, and piano.

== Career ==
=== 2005–2010: 3mcclaingirls ===
In 2005, the sisters' father had a friend over who was a music executive. The music executive heard the sisters sing and encouraged director Rob Hardy to audition China for his 2005 feature film The Gospel. China was cast as the character Alexis and her sisters were in the supporting cast. The sisters then became serious about a musical career and formed the girl group called the 3mcclaingirls.

They recorded their first song, "Silly Games". The song was produced by their father, Michael McClain, and written by their mother, Shontell McClain. In 2006 China joined the main cast of Tyler Perry's House of Payne as Jazmine Payne and Sierra made guest appearances. In 2007 the group starred in the film Daddy's Little Girls as the James sisters. In 2008 the group recorded the song "Daddy's Girl", inspired by the movie, and released it exclusively on MySpace. In 2008 the group began posting videos on their YouTube channel of themselves singing covers of songs. They also continued pursuing their acting careers separately, making various appearances in films and on television.

=== 2011–2012: McClain Sisters and Hollywood Records ===
The sisters originally planned to use the name III as their group name, the number representing the three McClain girls in the group, but that idea was scrapped. They instead changed their group name to the McClain Sisters. That same year China landed her own show on the Disney Channel called A.N.T. Farm. On October 11, 2011, the A.N.T. Farm soundtrack was released on which the group released two songs: "Perfect Mistake" and "Electronic Apology". The group had plans to release their debut album with the record label but never did. In December the group performed their version of the song "Jingle Bell Rock" at the 2011 Disney Parks Christmas Day Parade. In March 2012, the group signed with Hollywood Records. On March 4, 2012, they were the opening act in Houston at the Houston Rodeo for Big Time Rush on their Better with U Tour.

On March 11, 2012, they performed their new song called "Rise" at the Mall of America. The song was written by the sisters and produced by their father, Michael McClain, and was the lead promotional single for the Disneynature film Chimpanzee. The song was released on March 23, 2012. The music video premiered on March 25, 2012, during an episode of Austin & Ally. It was also a featured song for Disney's Friends for Change. The music video later premiered online on March 26, 2012. On April 9, 2012, McClain performed at the 2012 White House Easter Egg Roll.

On September 11, 2012, their single "The Great Divide" was released which was featured in the Disney film Secret of the Wings, and on the film's soundtrack Disney Fairies: Faith, Trust, and Pixie Dust. The song peaked at number 4 on Billboard's US Kid Digital Songs. On October 2, 2012, their version of "Jingle Bell Rock" was featured on the album Disney Channel Holiday Playlist.

On November 2, 2012, the McClain Sisters premiered their debut single "Go." Lauryn and Sierra guest starred and performed the song, alongside China, on November 23, 2012, during the episode "chANTs of a Lifetime" for A.N.T. Farm. In November 2012, the group performed at the Hollywood Christmas Parade at Universal CityWalk Hollywood.

=== 2013–2015: Leaving Hollywood Records and McClain ===
On March 5, 2013, the soundtrack album Shake It Up: I Love Dance was released for which the group performed their single "Sharp as a Razor." In December 2013, China announced on Twitter that A.N.T. Farm would be ending after its third season. Shortly after this announcement, the McClain Sisters parted ways with Hollywood Records. After leaving the record label, the group changed their name from the McClain Sisters to simply McClain. In December 2013, the group performed once again at the Hollywood Christmas Parade at Universal CityWalk Hollywood. The group released an official lyric video for their single "He Loves Me" on YouTube on December 14, 2013.

The song then became available on iTunes on February 20, 2014. On April 26, 2014, McClain performed at the pre-show for the 2014 Radio Disney Music Awards and presented an award. In May, McClain performed alongside Soulja Boy and Drake Bell at the 4th Annual "Move Your Body" celebration in Virginia, in support of Michelle Obama's Let's Move! initiative. In June, the group performed at Thirst Project's gala. On June 29, McClain had their first headlining concert at the House of Blues in Anaheim, California. One month before the show in May, the sisters promoted their concert by performing on the talk show Home & Family.

From the summer to the fall of 2014, the group toured the United States, performing at various state fairs including: the Wisconsin State Fair, Delaware State Fair, West Virginia State Fair, North Carolina State Fair, York Fair, and the Ohio State Fair. In August 2014, McClain also performed at Six Flags Over Texas, and the 19th Arthur Ashe Kids' Day. Later that year, McClain released their Christmas song called "The Holiday Song" on December 13.

In 2015 the group released the song "Clip My Wings" which was featured in the film The Sparrows: The Nesting and on the film's soundtrack The Sparrows: Now & Then. In 2015 the group released an Independent song, "Feelin' Like", on their SoundCloud. Thereafter, McClain went on hiatus, during which all three sisters pursued their acting careers.

=== 2020–present: Return from hiatus and Thriii ===
In June 2020 the group returned from their hiatus, changed their name to Thriii, and released their single "My Sanity". Their first professional performance under the name was in Radio Disney Presents ARDYs Summer Playlist.

On October 1, 2021, Thriii released a remix of "Calling All the Monsters" entitled, "Calling All the Monsters (2021 Version) (feat. Messenger)" which was originally performed solo by band member, China in 2012. The music video was released on October 8, 2021, on YouTube.

In April 2023, the group was reunited for an episode of 9-1-1 Lone Star, which starred Sierra at the time, playing sisters.

== Personal lives ==
In 2014, Lauryn and China created a YouTube channel where they posted singing videos, challenges, tags, and Q&As. Sierra appeared in several of the channel's videos. Their last YouTube video was posted in April 2018 and the channel has since been inactive. As of 2020, the channel has approximately 677,000 subscribers and over 28 million views. They have since renamed the channel Thriii.

They are Christians and reside in Atlanta, Georgia, with their family.

== Discography ==
=== Singles ===
Title	Year	Album
"My Sanity" (feat. The Messenger)	2020	Non-album singles

=== Promotional singles ===
Title	Year	Album
"Silly Games" (featuring Tiff Mic)	2005	Non-album singles
"Daddy's Girl"	2007	Daddy's Little Girls
"Rise"	2012	Non-album singles
"Go"	2012	Non-album singles
"The Great Divide"	2012	Disney Fairies: Faith, Trust, and Pixie Dust
"He Loves Me"	2014	Non-album singles
"The Holiday Song"	2014	Non-album singles

=== Other appearances ===
Title	Year	Album
"Perfect Mistake"	2011	A.N.T. Farm
"Electronic Apology"	2011	A.N.T. Farm
"Jingle Bell Rock"	2012	Disney Channel Holiday Playlist
"Sharp as a Razor"	2013	Shake It Up: I <3 Dance
"Clip My Wings"	2015	The Sparrows: Now & Then

=== Music videos ===
Title	Year	Director
"Rise"	2012	
"The Great Divide"	2012	
"My Sanity"	2020	
"Calling All the Monsters"	2021	Gil Green

== Tours ==
=== Headlining ===
- State Tour (2014)

=== Opening act ===
- Big Time Rush – Better with U Tour (2012)
