= Sabrina Carpenter =

American singer, songwriter and actress (born 1999)

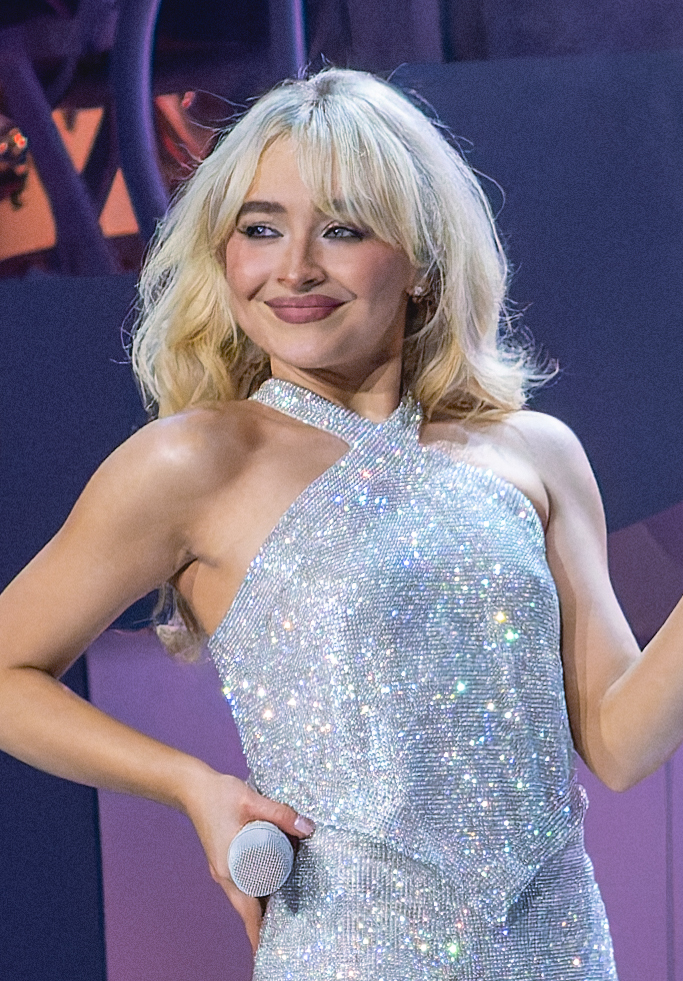
- Carpenter in 2025
- Born: Sabrina Annlynn Carpenter; May 11, 1999 (age 27); Quakertown, Pennsylvania, US
- Occupations: Singer; songwriter; actress
- Years active: 2008–present
- Works: Discography; songs; concert tours
- Television: Filmography
- Awards: Full list
- Musical career
- Genres: Pop; dance; R&B
- Instruments: Vocals; guitar; bass; keyboards
- Labels: Hollywood; Island
- Website: www.sabrinacarpenter.com

Sabrina Annlynn Carpenter (born May 11, 1999) is an American singer, songwriter, and actress. Her accolades include two Grammy Awards, an Emmy Award, three American Music Awards, a Brit Award and six MTV Video Music Awards. She was recognized by Time in their Time 100 Next list in 2024. Carpenter first gained prominence starring as Maya Hart on the Disney Channel series Girl Meets World (2014–2017). She signed with Hollywood Records and achieved limited success with her studio albums, Eyes Wide Open (2015), Evolution (2016), Singular: Act I (2018), and Singular: Act II (2019).

Carpenter joined Island Records in 2021, releasing her fifth album, Emails I Can't Send (2022), featuring the multi-platinum singles "Nonsense" and "Feather". Her sixth studio album, Short n' Sweet (2024), topped the US Billboard 200 and won two Grammy Awards. It produced the global number-one singles "Espresso" and "Please Please Please", the latter becoming her first to top the US Billboard Hot 100. Her seventh studio album, Man's Best Friend (2025), also topped the Billboard 200 and spawned the US number-one single "Manchild".

Carpenter has acted in films such as Adventures in Babysitting (2016), The Hate U Give (2018), The Short History of the Long Road (2019), Clouds (2020), and Emergency (2022). She has also starred in the Netflix films Tall Girl (2019), Tall Girl 2 (2022), and Work It (2020). (Note: the last of which she executive-produced) She has served as both a host and musical guest on Saturday Night Live, hosted the Netflix special A Nonsense Christmas with Sabrina Carpenter (2024), and guest starred in the Disney+ variety sketch special The Muppet Show (2026), the latter of which earned her a Primetime Emmy Award as an executive producer. On Broadway, she played Cady Heron in the musical Mean Girls (2020). (Note: Her stint was short-lived, performing for two shows, before her run was cancelled due to the COVID-19 pandemic.)

== Early life ==
Sabrina Annlynn Carpenter was born on May 11, 1999, in Quakertown, Pennsylvania, to David and Elizabeth (née Sneidar) Carpenter, and raised in East Greenville. Her oldest sister, Shannon, is a dancer. Her older sister, Sarah, is her creative partner and a photographer. They have an older paternal half-sister, Cayla, who is a hairdresser and makeup artist. Their father is a step-brother of actress Nancy Cartwright.

Carpenter was homeschooled and moved to Los Angeles when she was thirteen. She began studying voice at age six. Around age ten, she began posting videos on YouTube of herself singing Christina Aguilera and Adele songs. When Carpenter was 10, her father built a recording studio to fuel her passion for music.

== Career ==
=== 2008–2014: Breakthrough with Disney ===
In October 2008, Carpenter was one of 7,000 to enter the online singing contest The Next Miley Cyrus Project, run by Miley Cyrus. She placed third in 2010. Around this time, Carpenter signed with manager Bill Perlman.

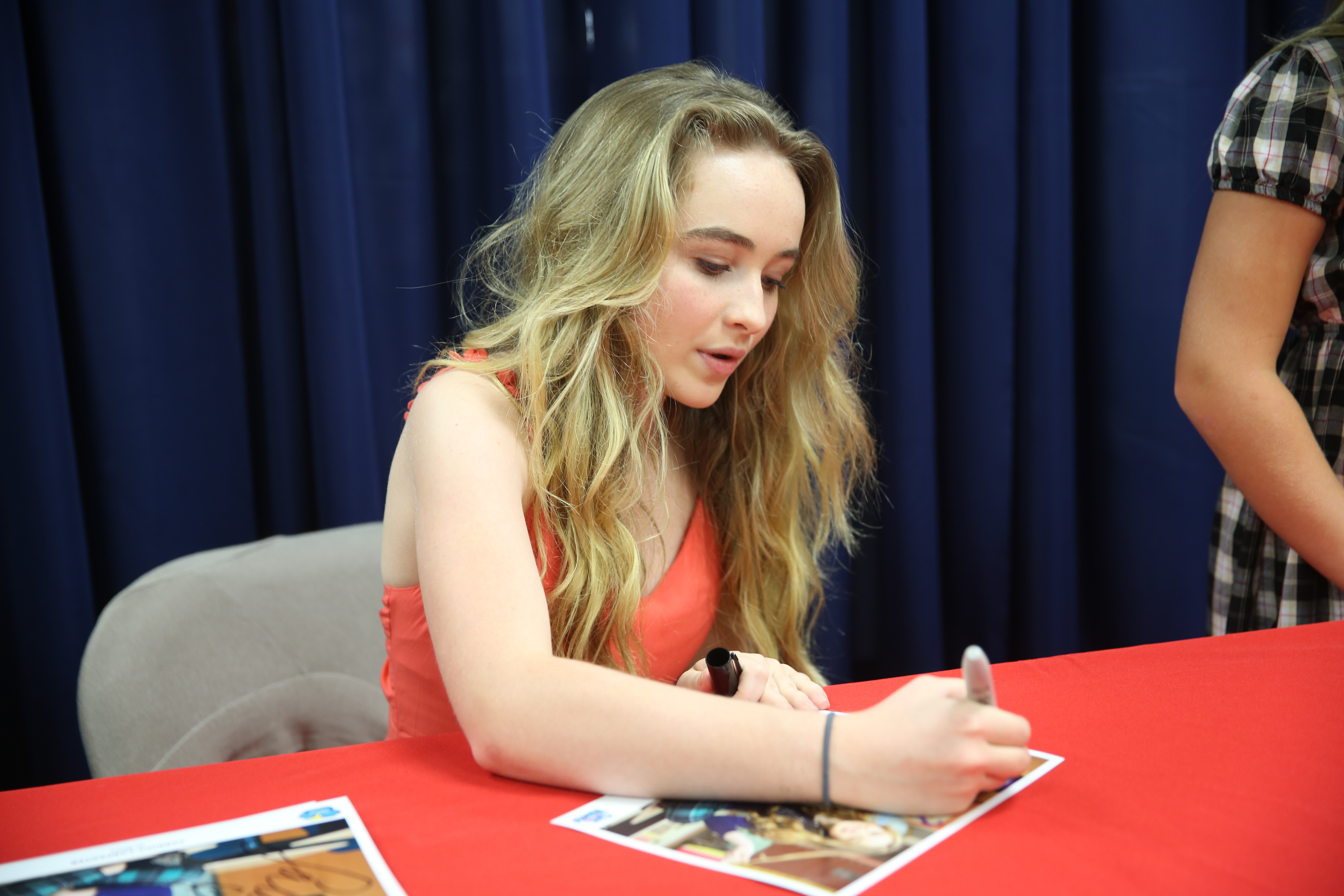
Carpenter signing autographs at Marine Corps Air Station Cherry Point, Havelock, North Carolina, in 2014

Carpenter's first acting role was in 2011 in a guest role on the NBC drama series Law & Order: Special Victims Unit. Around the same time, she performed as part of the Hunan Broadcasting System's Gold Mango Audience Festival program in China, singing "Something's Got a Hold on Me". In the summer of 2012, Carpenter had a recurring role in the Fox sitcom The Goodwin Games. She appeared as young Merrin Williams in Horns (2013) and recorded "Smile" for the compilation album Disney Fairies: Faith, Trust, and Pixie Dust, inspired by the Disney Fairies film series; the song charted on Radio Disney. She had a recurring role as Princess Vivian in Sofia the First from 2013 to 2018, for which she recorded various songs, including "All You Need" with Ariel Winter.

In January 2013, Carpenter was cast in a Disney Channel series Girl Meets World, a spin-off of Boy Meets World, as Maya Hart. The show consisted of 72 episodes, and concluded on January 20, 2017. Carpenter recorded the show's theme song alongside her co-star Rowan Blanchard. From 2010 to 2013, Carpenter released various independent promotional singles before signing a five-album deal with Disney label Hollywood Records in 2014.

In March 2014, Carpenter released her debut single, "Can't Blame a Girl for Trying", which was co-written by Meghan Trainor. The single received positive reviews and titled her debut EP of the same name that was released in April 2014. In July 2014, Carpenter contributed lead vocals to the Disney Channel Circle of Stars cover version of "Do You Want to Build a Snowman?". She recorded "Stand Out" for the Disney Channel movie, How to Build a Better Boy, which premiered in August 2014. She released her first Christmas single, "Silver Nights", that same year.

=== 2015–2017: Eyes Wide Open and Evolution ===
In January 2015, Carpenter released the song "We'll Be the Stars". It served as the lead single for her debut studio album Eyes Wide Open, which was released on April 14, 2015, and peaked at number 43 on the Billboard 200. According to Billboard, it sold over 12,000 copies in its first week. Upon release, the album received positive reviews and went on to win two Radio Disney Music Awards. The album was followed with a second single, "Eyes Wide Open". In August, Carpenter performed at the D23 Expo. In December, Carpenter released her second Christmas single, "Christmas The Whole Year Round".

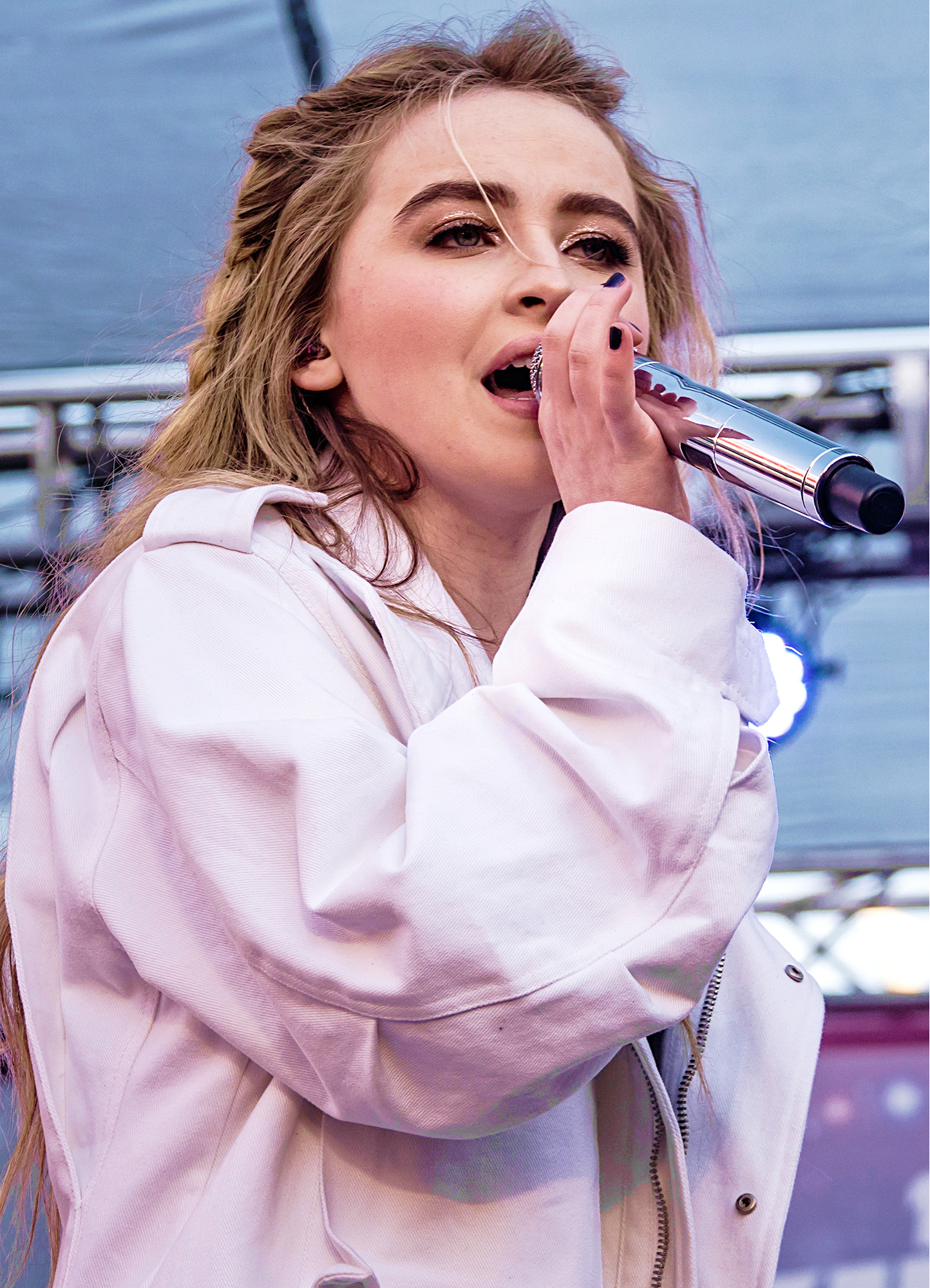
Carpenter performing live at the Jingle Ball at Staples Center in Los Angeles in 2016

In February 2016, Carpenter released the standalone single titled "Smoke and Fire". She performed the song at the 2016 Radio Disney Music Awards. In June 2016, Carpenter starred as Jenny Parker in the Disney Channel Original Movie Adventures in Babysitting (2016) alongside Sofia Carson. For the film, the two performed the theme track, "Wildside", together. Later that year, she appeared in a Pasadena Playhouse production of Peter Pan and Tinker Bell: A Pirate's Christmas. In August, Carpenter headlined the Bethlehem's Musikfest festival. She began voicing Melissa Chase on Milo Murphy's Law.

In October 2016, Carpenter released her second studio album, Evolution which debuted on the Billboard 200 at number 28, selling 13,000 copies in its first week. The album included two singles: "On Purpose", which was nominated for a Radio Disney Music Award, and "Thumbs", which peaked at number one on Billboard's Bubbling Under Hot 100 chart and was later certified Platinum by the Recording Industry Association of America (RIAA). Two promotional singles were released from the album including "All We Have Is Love" and "Run and Hide". Carpenter performed "Thumbs" on The Today Show and The Late Late Show with James Corden. She embarked on her first headlining concert tour, the EVOLution Tour, in autumn of 2016.

In March 2017, Carpenter performed the theme song for the Disney Channel show Andi Mack. In May, Carpenter featured on the single "Hands" with The Vamps and Mike Perry. In July, Carpenter released the single "Why", which received positive reviews, and peaked at number 21 on the Billboard Bubbling Under Hot 100, becoming her second entry on the chart. It was nominated for a Radio Disney Music Award. In the summer of that year, Carpenter embarked on her second headlining concert tour, the De-Tour. She opened for Ariana Grande on her Dangerous Woman Tour in São Paulo.

In December, Carpenter released a cover of "Have Yourself a Merry Little Christmas". That same year, she released covers of "Sign of the Times" and "You're a Mean One, Mr. Grinch" with British singer Jasmine Thompson and violinist Lindsey Stirling respectively.

=== 2018–2020: Singular and film projects ===
In March 2018, Carpenter released the song "Alien" with English DJ Jonas Blue. The song reached number one on the US Dance Club Songs chart and number 12 on the US Dance/Electronic Songs chart. The duo performed it on Jimmy Kimmel Live!. In May, Carpenter was included in Nylon magazine's "25 Gen Z'ers Changing The World". In September, Carpenter appeared in The Hate U Give (2018), based on the novel of the same name.

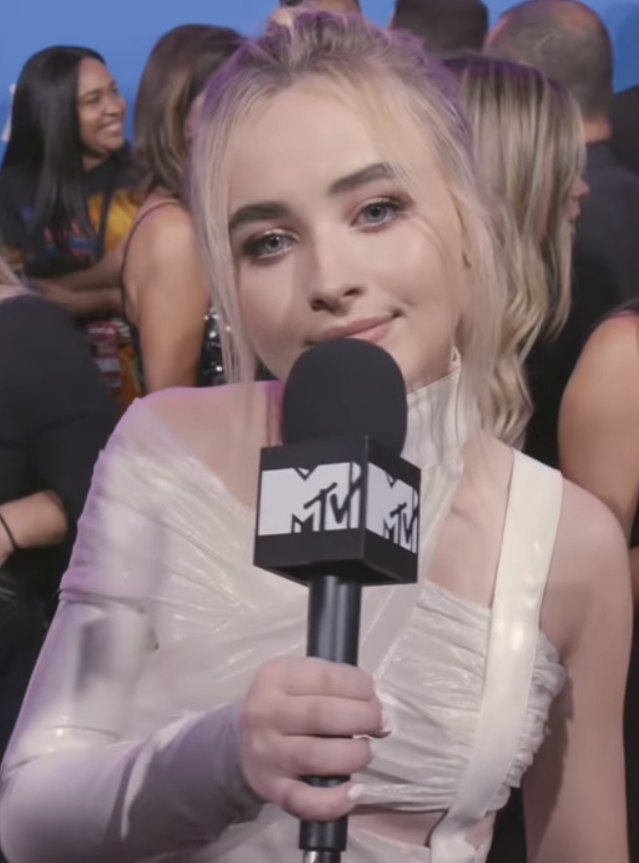
Carpenter at the 2018 MTV Video Music Awards

On November 9, 2018, Carpenter released her third studio album, Singular: Act I, which received positive reviews. Originally set to be released as one album, Carpenter announced that the album had been split into two acts with second act set for release in early 2019. The album spawned two singles, "Almost Love" and "Sue Me", which both reached number one on the US Dance Club Songs chart. Two promotional singles also preceded the album: "Paris" and "Bad Time". Carpenter promoted the album on The Today Show, as well as Live with Kelly and Ryan.

In March 2019, Carpenter embarked on her third headlining concert tour, the Singular Tour. That month, Carpenter featured on Alan Walker's single, "On My Way", alongside Farruko. In June 2019, she starred in the drama film The Short History of the Long Road. The film had had its world premiere at the Tribeca Film Festival and was released by FilmRise. It received positive reviews with Carpenter's role being praised.

On July 19, 2019, Carpenter released her fourth studio album, Singular: Act II. The album received positive reviews upon release and found Carpenter exploring more personal topics than her previous works, including themes of anxiety and self-reflection. Several tracks were released for the album including three promotional singles "Pushing 20", "Exhale", and "I'm Fakin", and sole single "In My Bed". To promote the album, she performed on Good Morning America's Summer Concert Series. In September 2019, Carpenter appeared in the Netflix film Tall Girl. She was cast in an adaptation of The Distance From Me to You. (Note: As of 2025, the film has not been released.)

In February 2020, Carpenter released a Valentine's Day-themed R&B single titled "Honeymoon Fades", which was received positively by critics. A month later, she made her Broadway debut in Mean Girls. The show closed the day after Carpenter's debut due to the COVID-19 pandemic closing Broadway and never reopened. She performed in two performances of the show. In May 2020, she performed "Your Mother and Mine" on the ABC broadcast television special, The Disney Family Singalong Volume II. She had a recurring role in Royalties for which she performed "Perfect Song" for the soundtrack.

In July 2020, Carpenter released the song, "Let Me Move You", for the Netflix film Work It, in which she starred and executive produced. Her role received generally positive reviews. The film's soundtrack featured Zara Larsson's "Wow", which led to Carpenter featuring on the remix of the song, released in September of that year. In October, Carpenter starred in the Disney+ film Clouds, based on the life of Zach Sobiech. She contributed to the film's soundtrack. In December 2020, Carpenter was listed under Forbes' 30 Under 30 list in the Hollywood and entertainment category.

=== 2021–2023: Emails I Can't Send and wider recognition ===
In January 2021, Carpenter announced that she had signed to Universal Music Group's Island Records. She released her first single under the label, "Skin", on January 22, 2021. The song peaked at number 48 and 33 on the Billboard Hot 100 and the Billboard Global 200, becoming her first entry on both charts. Carpenter performed the song on The Late Late Show with James Corden and at the 32nd annual GLAAD Media Awards. In September, she appeared in the third volume of Prime Video's Savage X Fenty Show. On September 9, 2021, Carpenter released "Skinny Dipping", the lead single from her then-forthcoming fifth studio album. She released "Fast Times" on February 18, 2022, as a follow-up single. That same month, she appeared in Tall Girl 2. In May 2022, Carpenter appeared in Amazon Studios' film Emergency which had premiered at the 2022 Sundance Film Festival that January.

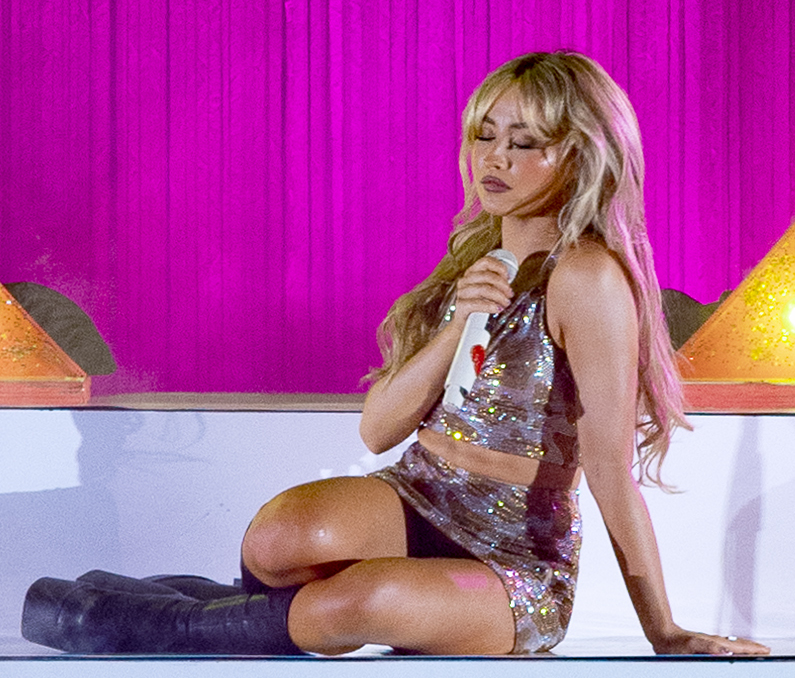
Carpenter performing on the Emails I Can't Send Tour in 2022

On July 15, 2022, Carpenter released her fifth studio album, Emails I Can't Send, which debuted and peaked at number 23 on the Billboard 200 with 18,000 album equivalent units sold. The album was further promoted with the singles: "Vicious" "Because I Liked a Boy", and "Nonsense". The Emails I Can't Send Tour began in September of that year. "Nonsense" went viral on TikTok due to Carpenter performing newly improvised outros for the song on tour. The song peaked at number 56 on the Hot 100, was certified Platinum by the RIAA, and reached the top-10 on the US Pop Airplay chart.

In March 2023, Carpenter released a deluxe edition of Emails I Can't Send. One of the bonus tracks, "Feather", became the final single in August 2023, peaking at number one on the US Pop Songs chart and number 21 on the Billboard Hot 100. She performed the song at the 2023 MTV Video Music Awards pre-show and at Dick Clark's New Year's Rockin' Eve. The song's music video, released in October 2023, drew polarized reactions due to its violent imagery and was filmed at the Annunciation of the Blessed Virgin Mary Catholic Church in Brooklyn, New York. The pastor apologized for allowing the shoot, unaware of the content. Carpenter responded, stating advance permission was granted and noting, "Jesus was a carpenter." Bishop Robert J. Brennan relieved the pastor of his administrative duties in the diocese and held a Mass of reparation to "restore the sanctity of this church". The investigation into the priest who granted permission uncovered evidence that led to the indictment of New York City mayor Eric Adams.

Carpenter was the opening act for the Eras Tour by Taylor Swift for a number of its Latin American, Australian and Singaporean shows throughout 2023 and 2024. She released a cover of Swift's "I Knew You Were Trouble" as a Spotify special and said that opening for Swift was a "childhood dream come true". Carpenter described her experience at the Eras Tour as "unlike any crowd I've ever played to before". On November 17, 2023, Carpenter released a Christmas-themed EP, Fruitcake, featuring "A Nonsense Christmas" which was released a year earlier.

=== 2024–present: Short n' Sweet and Man's Best Friend ===
In March 2024, Carpenter featured on Norwegian singer-songwriter Girl in Red's single "You Need Me Now?". On April 11, Carpenter released the single "Espresso", and performed at the 2024 Coachella Music Festival the following day. "Espresso" topped the Billboard Global 200, peaked at number three on the Billboard Hot 100 chart and went on to win the MTV Video Music Award for Song of the Year. At the end of the year, "Espresso" became the second most streamed song of the year on Spotify at 1.6 billion. Carpenter followed with a second single, "Please Please Please" on June 6, 2024, which became her second global chart-topper and her first US Hot 100 number one single. With these songs, she became the first female artist to hold the number one and two positions on the UK singles chart for three weeks in a row.

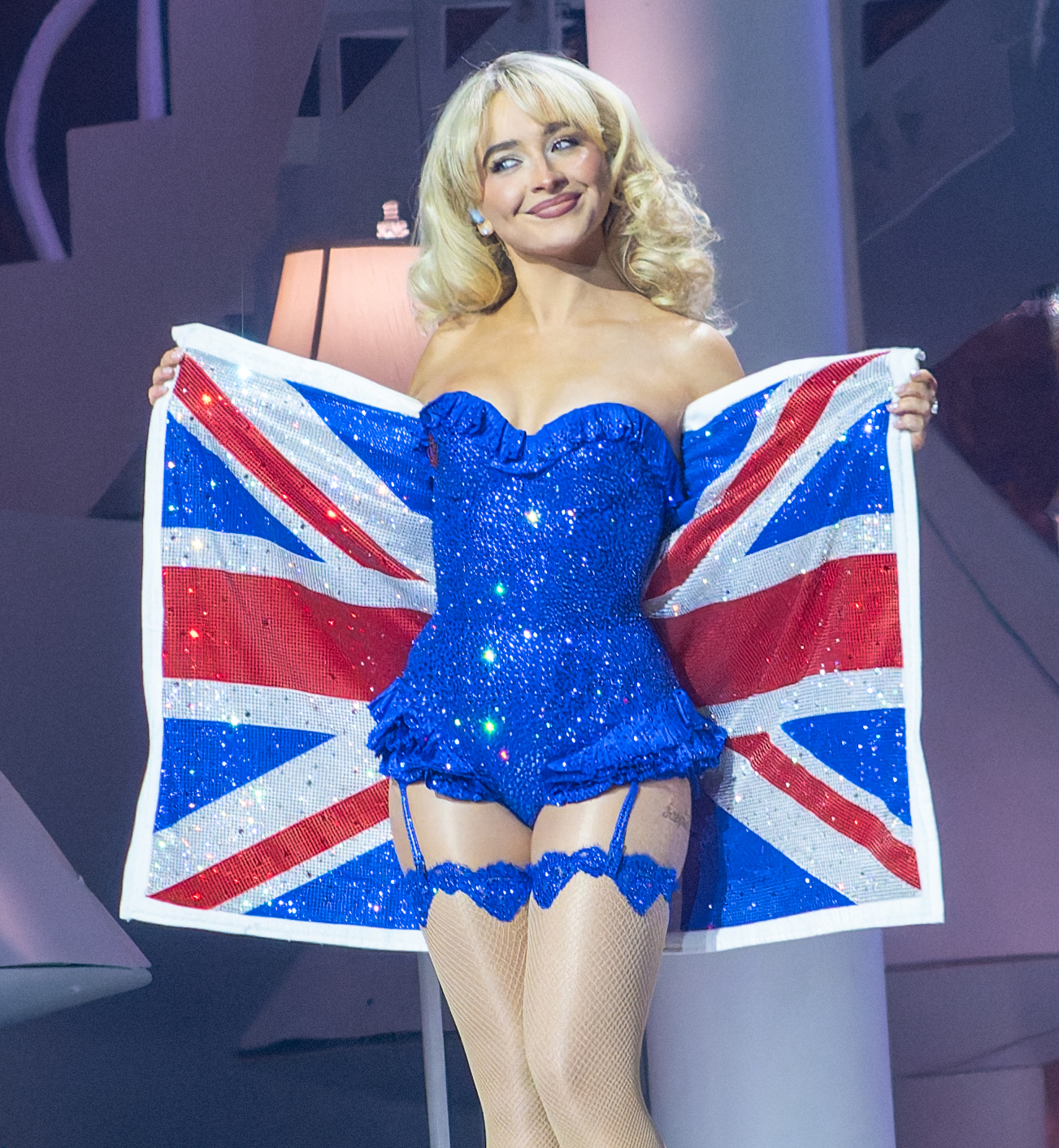
Carpenter performing at the O2 Arena as part of her Short n' Sweet Tour in 2025

Carpenter released her sixth studio album, Short n' Sweet, on August 23, debuting at number one the Billboard 200 with 362,000 units sold in its first week. All tracks charted in the top 50 of the Hot 100. At the 67th Annual Grammy Awards, Carpenter earned six nominations, including Best New Artist, while the album was nominated for Best Pop Vocal Album and Album of the Year. It won Best Pop Vocal Album, and "Espresso" won Best Pop Solo Performance. The third single, "Taste", debuted at number two on the Hot 100, making Carpenter the first act since the Beatles to chart their first three top-five hits within a single week. The first three singles stayed in the top ten for seven consecutive weeks, a record for any female artist. Carpenter also became the first artist in 71 years to spend 20 weeks atop the UK singles chart in a calendar year, with "Taste" as the longest-running UK number one of 2024. A deluxe version with five additional tracks including a duet of "Please Please Please" with Dolly Parton, was released on February 14, 2025.

In September 2024, Carpenter appeared on Christina Aguilera's live Spotify-exclusive special celebrating the 25th anniversary of Aguilera's self-titled debut album, duetting on "What a Girl Wants", which was later nominated for a Webby Award. That month, she embarked on the Short n' Sweet Tour, her first arena tour. Carpenter produced and starred in a Netflix holiday special, A Nonsense Christmas with Sabrina Carpenter, released on December 6 and featuring duets with Chappell Roan, Tyla, and Shania Twain, among others.

On June 5, 2025, Carpenter released the single, "Manchild", which debuted at number one on the Hot 100, marking her first debut number one and second number one song overall on the chart. She performed it for the first time at Primavera Sound 2025 and then at BST Hyde Park. Her seventh studio album, Man's Best Friend, was released on August 29, 2025. The reveal of the cover art–depicting Carpenter on her hands and knees with an out-of-frame man grabbing her hair while she "paws" at his leg–divided both critics and fans. Some found it degrading to women, while others found it provocative and satirical. The album debuted atop the US Billboard 200, selling 366,000 equivalent album units in its first week, marking the highest-selling week for an album by a female artist in 2025 and third highest-selling week for an album overall that year.

In August 2025, Carpenter performed as a headlining act at the Lollapalooza festival in Chicago, where she was joined by Earth, Wind & Fire. She featured on the title track of Taylor Swift's album The Life of a Showgirl, released on October 3, 2025. Carpenter was a headlining act at the Austin City Limits Music Festival in October, performing with Shania Twain and the Chicks. She headlined several festivals throughout 2026, including Lollapalooza Chile, Brazil and Argentina; Asunciónico; Festival Estéreo Picnic; and Coachella. Madonna made a guest appearance at Carpenter's second weekend Coachella performance, where they debuted their new duet "Bring Your Love" from Madonna's upcoming album Confessions II and performed "Vogue" and "Like a Prayer". At the 2026 Met Gala, Carpenter performed with Stevie Nicks. She executive produced and guest starred in the Disney+ variety sketch special The Muppet Show (2026), for which she earned the Primetime Emmy Award for Outstanding Variety Special (Pre-Recorded). In 2026, she was cast as dancer and actress Ginger Rogers in an upcoming Fred Astaire film biopic directed by Paul King starring Tom Holland as Astaire and Margaret Qualley as Adele Astaire.

== Artistry ==
=== Influences ===
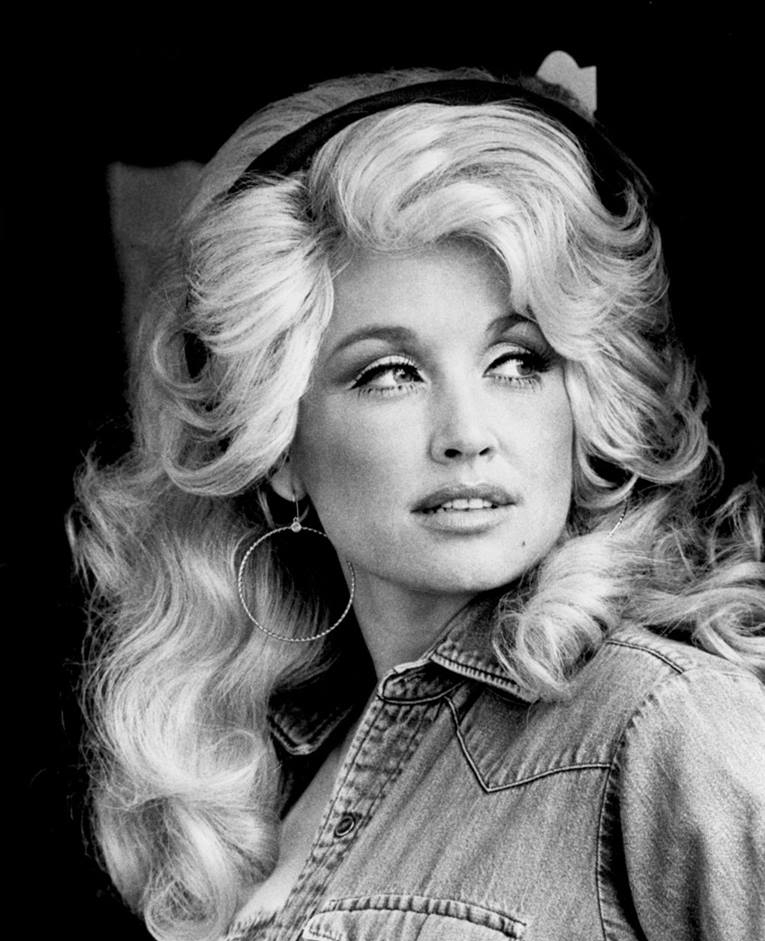
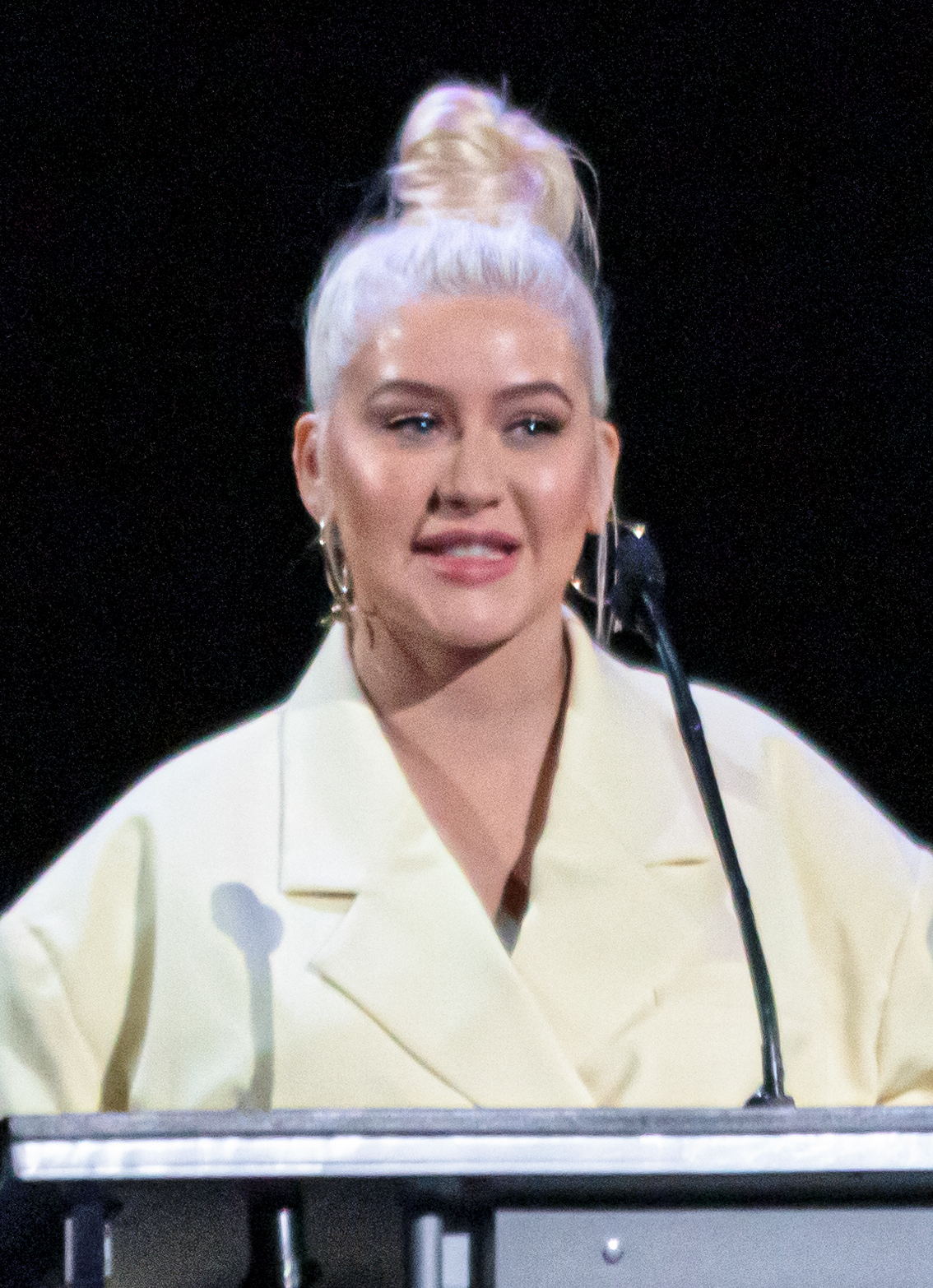
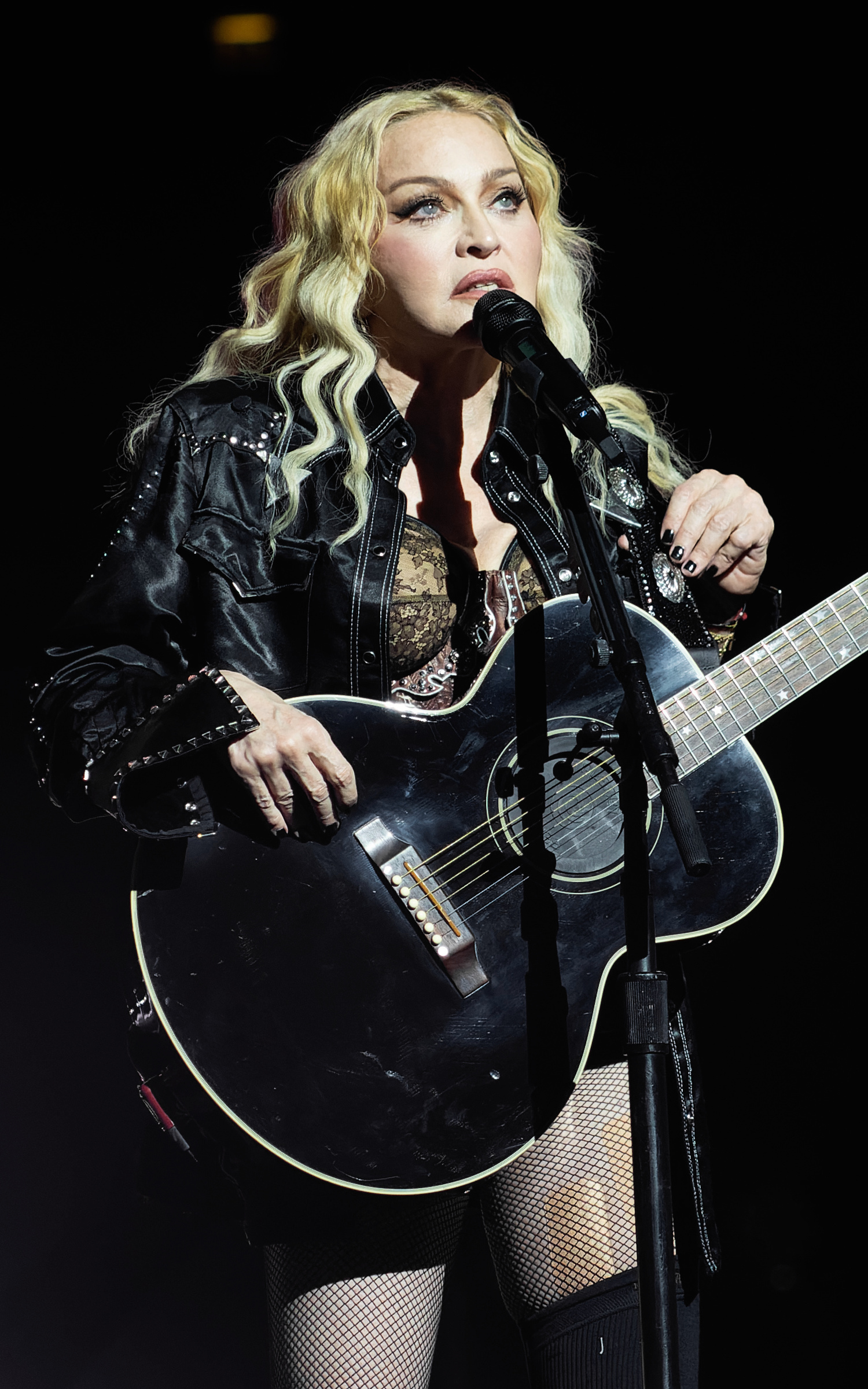
Carpenter credits artists such as (left to right) Dolly Parton, Christina Aguilera, and Madonna as major musical influences.

Songs of female pop artists such as Madonna, Britney Spears, Mariah Carey, and Christina Aguilera acquainted Carpenter with pop music. Carpenter named R&B as a genre that often influences her work, and cited Aguilera and Rihanna as early musical influences. She has credited Aguilera's song "Beautiful" (2002) with helping her "showcase and develop [her] own voice". She has cited Taylor Swift and Lorde as her songwriting influences, while also taking inspiration from Beyoncé's genre-bending works. She claimed Swift's live performances and work ethic have inspired her. She has said that she listened to Dolly Parton's Heartbreaker "every morning" and has called Parton "one of [her] biggest idols". Parton's influence on Carpenter's music and presentation has been noted by the media on songs such as "Manchild".

Carpenter has also named ABBA, Aretha Franklin, the Beatles, Whitney Houston, and Etta James as musical influences. She also shared admiration for Ariana Grande, being inspired by her live performances and the resilience and positivity she shares in her music. Carpenter's music and image have often been compared to Grande's by critics and the media.

=== Musical styles ===
Early in her career, Carpenter was described as a "teen pop singer". Later on in her career, Carpenter began to embrace pop music, with i-D writer Barry Pierce noting that after the release of Emails I Can't Send, she "can rightfully claim the title of fully fledged popstar". Variety writer Thania Garcia noted that while Carpenter was "considered a Disney princess for years, her transition from child actor to pop star [...] has been slow, steady and intentional". Carpenter felt that her transition from a Disney-star was hard, with Pierce noting that she has since had more autonomy over her work. Carpenter noted in an interview with Vogue that her "prior music put forth a facet of herself that she didn't feel was authentic at the time". Her stage presence has also been praised with Vogue writer Chelsea Sarabia noting that "as an artist and performer, [Carpenter] wields the full range of human expression as if it were an instrument of its own".

Carpenter's albums often incorporate pop, dance, and R&B, with elements of folk-pop, acoustic, country, electropop, and house. Her albums post-Singular: Act I have delved into styles such as dance-pop, trap, hip-hop, and R&B. On her sound, Carpenter noted that her music has "elements of everything". In an interview with Variety in 2024, Carpenter noted that she felt separated from her albums pre-Emails I Can't Send, noting that it was "largely due to the shift in who I am as a person and as an artist, pre-pandemic and post-pandemic". Alex Hopper of American Songwriter remarked storytelling as a motif of Carpenter's songs. Carpenter's voice has been described as a soprano.

=== Songwriting ===
Carpenter has co-written most of her songs, with sole lyricist credits for two tracks on Emails I Can't Send; she has stated in interviews that she is the main songwriter on her songs. Her preferred songwriting process is to start writing by deciding the song's title and building on from there, documenting her life experiences confessionally. Producer Jack Antonoff, who collaborated with Carpenter on the production of her sixth album Short n' Sweet, commended the way she weaved humor into her music and her songwriting voice, naming ABBA as a reference point for Carpenter when creating music. Antonoff mentioned that he worked solely on the music of "Sharpest Tool" with Carpenter handling the lyrics. Of Emails I Can't Send, Carpenter said "I would hope that if someone had never listened to my music before, and they listened to this album, they would leave it feeling like they know me better as a person."

Carpenter also worked on the compositions of some of her songs, including "Espresso" and "Please Please Please". She also performs her own musical accompaniment, with musical knowledge of the piano, bass, ukulele, guitar, and drums. She played the guitar during her set on the Short n' Sweet Tour, and played the piano and electric guitar during her Coachella set in 2024.

== Other ventures ==
=== Activism and philanthropy ===
In 2016, Carpenter became an ambassador for the Ryan Seacrest Foundation and visited various children's hospitals on their behalf. That same year, for the release of her single "Smoke and Fire", Carpenter released a T-shirt, with $10 of every shirt's proceeds going towards American Red Cross's 2Steps2Minutes campaign, which brought awareness to fire safety.

In 2017, Carpenter performed at the We Day California event. That same year, she partnered with DoSomething's Love Letters Challenge, aimed to combat isolation for senior citizens. Throughout her career, Carpenter has been an avid supporter of the LGBTQ+ community. In 2018, she participated in writing a love letter to the community for Billboard, stating that "when [fans] come to my shows with pride flags, screaming the lyrics at the top of [their] lungs, I hope [they] feel an overwhelming rush of love and safety." In April 2020, Carpenter appeared in a charity version of "If the World Was Ending", which supported Doctors Without Borders during the COVID-19 pandemic.

Carpenter partnered with the nonprofit PLUS1 on the Short n' Sweet Tour to create the Sabrina Carpenter Fund, focusing on "the issues of mental health, animal welfare, and the LGBTQ+ community". The fund took $1 from every tour ticket sold and reached $1 million faster than any other artist PLUS1 had partnered with. Half of the earnings from Carpenter's 2024 espresso-flavored ice cream collaboration with Van Leeuwen Ice Cream went to the Ali Forney Center, a nonprofit organization focused on supporting homeless LGBTQ+ youth. Carpenter's partnership with HeadCount had more voter engagements for the 2024 United States presidential election than any other artist that year. Amid the mass deportations during the second Trump administration, Carpenter shared an Instagram story that encouraged donations to the National Immigration Law Center. Her "Tears" performance at the 2025 VMAs included dancers in drag and signs in the background in support of trans rights.

In December 2025, after the White House used a snippet of her song "Juno" in a video promoting ICE on X, she responded to the post with "this video is evil and disgusting. Do not ever involve me or my music to benefit your inhumane agenda." In response, the White House refused to apologize for deporting "dangerous criminal illegal murderers, rapists, and pedophiles" from the United States. Referencing lyrics from Carpenter's "Manchild", they said anyone defending such people "must be stupid, or is it slow?" Shortly after, the White House deleted the tweet Carpenter replied to.

=== Endorsements and products ===
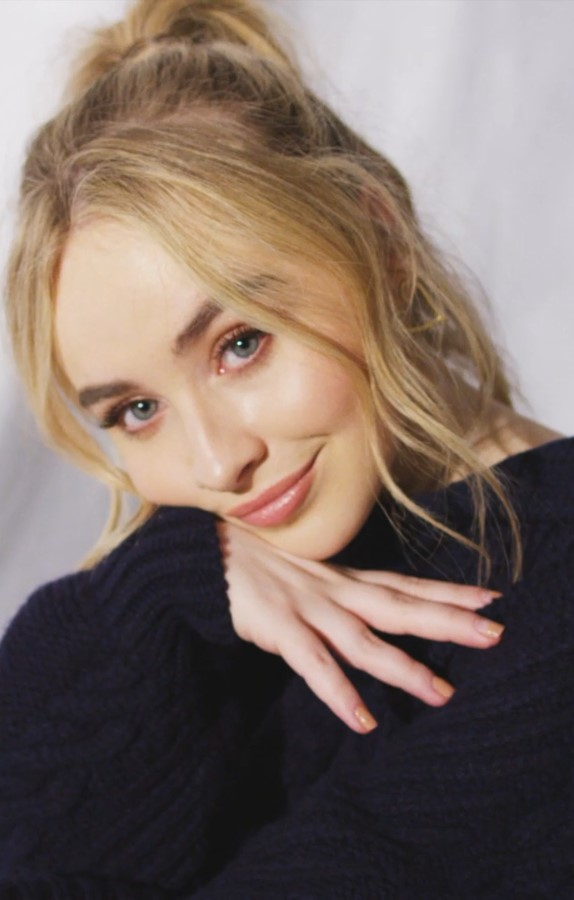
Carpenter at a Converse photoshoot in 2019

In 2017, Carpenter endorsed Converse's Forever Chuck campaign alongside Rowan Blanchard, Alton Mason and Cole Sprouse. In 2018, she became a brand ambassador for Aéropostale. She became a brand ambassador for Samsung USA in 2021, as part of the company's "Team Galaxy" partnership program. She performed at the Galaxy Creator Collective event hosted by Samsung in March 2022. Additionally, following her album's release in 2022, she performed a livestream concert at Samsung and Billboard's Summer of Galaxy annual event.

In September 2022, Carpenter released her debut fragrance in partnership with Scent Beauty, titled Sweet Tooth. The fragrance was nominated as a finalist by the Fragrance Foundation Awards for "Fragrance of the Year". In 2023, Carpenter announced her second fragrance, Caramel Dream. In July 2024, she announced her third fragrance, Cherry Baby.

In April 2024, Carpenter endorsed, and modeled for, new pieces for a campaign for Skims' Fits Everybody and Stretch Lace collections. She noted that "I loved the femininity of the whole creative" and that "I've always been a fan of the brand." That year in July, Carpenter appeared in an NBC advertisement for the 2024 Summer Olympics. In December 2024, Carpenter collaborated with Dunkin' Donuts to release an iced beverage, "Sabrina's Brown Sugar Shakin' Espresso", named in honor of her song "Espresso".

In April 2025, Fortnite collaborated with Carpenter to feature her titular skin as the main theme of Fortnite Festival Season 8, along with several other branded in-game cosmetics including emotes and music tracks. In October 2025, Carpenter recorded public service announcements for MTA New York City Transit's subway system.

== Personal life ==
Carpenter was previously in relationships with actor Bradley Steven Perry from 2014 to 2015, and actor Joshua Bassett from 2020 to 2021. She briefly dated singer Shawn Mendes in 2023 and actor Barry Keoghan from early to late 2024.

In June 2026, Carpenter filed a 5-year restraining order against an alleged stalker who tried breaking into her home.

== Discography ==
- Eyes Wide Open (2015)
- Evolution (2016)
- Singular: Act I (2018)
- Singular: Act II (2019)
- Emails I Can't Send (2022)
- Short n' Sweet (2024)
- Man's Best Friend (2025)

== Tours ==
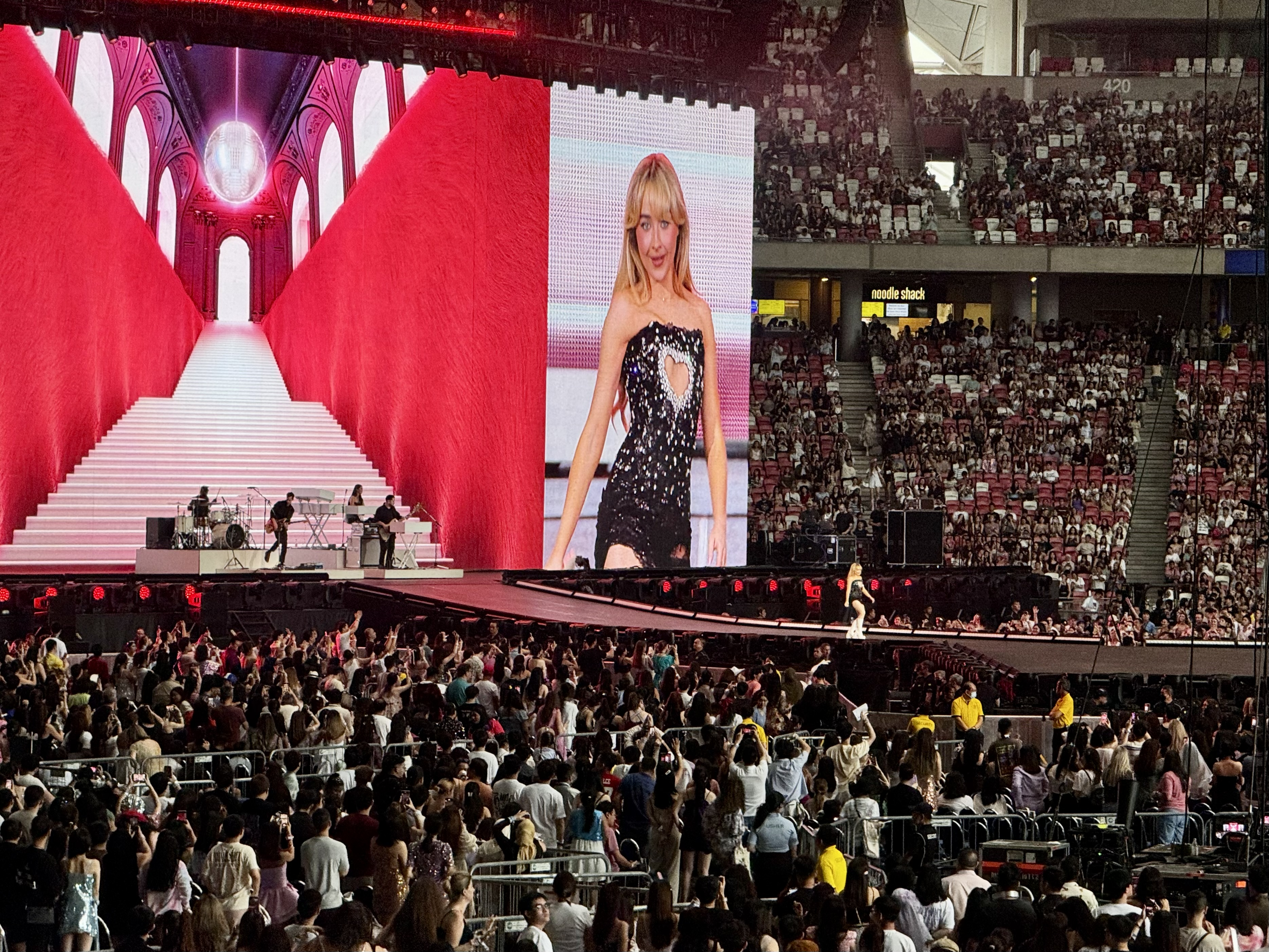
Carpenter opening for Taylor Swift on The Eras Tour in 2024

Headlining

- Evolution Tour (2016–2017)
- The De-Tour (2017)
- Singular Tour (2019)
- Emails I Can't Send Tour (2022–2023)
- Short n' Sweet Tour (2024–2025)

Opening act

- Ariana Grande – Dangerous Woman Tour (2017)
- The Vamps – Middle of the Night Tour (2017)
- Taylor Swift – The Eras Tour (2023–2024)

== Filmography ==
=== Film ===
Year	Title	Role	Notes	Ref.
2012	Noobz	Brittney		
2013	Horns	Young Merrin Williams		
2018	The Hate U Give	Hailey Grant		
2019	The Short History of the Long Road	Nola		
2019	Tall Girl	Harper Kreyman		
2020	Work It	Quinn Ackerman	Also executive producer	
2020	Clouds	Samantha "Sammy" Brown		
2022	Emergency	Maddy		
2022	Tall Girl 2	Harper Kreyman		
2026	Confessions II	Herself	Short film	

=== Television ===
Year	Title	Role	Notes	Ref.
2011	Law & Order: Special Victims Unit	Paula	Episode: "Possessed"	
2012	Phineas and Ferb	Girl	Voice role; episode: "What a Croc!/Ferb TV"	
2013–2018	Sofia the First	Princess Vivian	Recurring voice role; 16 episodes	
2013	The Goodwin Games	Young Chloe Goodwin	Recurring role; 5 episodes	
2013	Orange Is the New Black	Jessica Wedge	Episode: "Fucksgiving"	
2013	Austin & Ally	Lucy	Episode: "Moon Week & Mentors"	
2014–2017	Girl Meets World	Maya Hart	Main role; 72 episodes	
2016	Wander Over Yonder	Melodie	Voice role; episode: "The Legend"	
2016	Walk the Prank	Herself	Episode: "Adventures in Babysitting"	
2016	Adventures in Babysitting	Jenny Parker	Disney Channel Original Movie	
2016–2019	Milo Murphy's Law	Melissa Chase	Main voice role; 40 episodes	
2017	Soy Luna	Herself	2 episodes	
2018	Mickey and the Roadster Racers	Nina Glitter	Voice role; episode: "Super-Charged: Pop Star Helpers"	
2020	Punk'd	Herself	Episode: "Rat Trap with Sabrina Carpenter"	
2020	Royalties	Bailey Rouge	3 episodes	
2024	Saturday Night Live	Herself (musical guest) / Daphne Blake	Episode: "Jake Gyllenhaal/Sabrina Carpenter"	
2024	A Nonsense Christmas with Sabrina Carpenter	Herself	Netflix special, also executive producer	
2025	Saturday Night Live 50th Anniversary Special	Herself (musical guest)	NBC special	
2025	Saturday Night Live	Herself (host / musical guest)	Episode: "Sabrina Carpenter"	
2025	Taylor Swift: The End of an Era	Herself	Episode: "Thank You for the Lovely Bouquet"	
2026	Saturday Night Live	Tyson	Episode: "Finn Wolfhard/ASAP Rocky"	
2026	The Muppet Show	Herself	TV special, guest starring, also executive producer	

=== Theater ===
Year	Production	Role	Location	Category	Ref.
2015	Peter Pan and Tinker Bell: A Pirate's Christmas	Wendy Darling	Pasadena Playhouse	Regional	
2020	Mean Girls	Cady Heron	August Wilson Theatre	Broadway	

=== Video games ===
Year	Title	Role	Notes	Ref.
2011	Just Dance Kids 2	Coach		
2025	Fortnite	Skin	Exclusive skins; Theme of Fortnite Festival Season 8; various music and emotes	

== Awards and nominations ==
Carpenter has won two Grammy Awards, six MTV Video Music Awards, a MTV Europe Music Award, multiple iHeartRadio Music Awards, and she was a finalist for a Shorty Award. At the 67th Grammy Awards, she was nominated in all "Big Four" categories. In 2026 she was nominated for her first Emmy Award and won for executive producing the 2026 special of The Muppet Show.
