= Go (McClain Sisters song) =

2012 single by McClain Sisters

Promotional single by McClain Sisters
- Released: November 6, 2012
- Recorded: 2012
- Genre: Electropop
- Length: 3:13
- Label: Hollywood
- Songwriters: Antonia Armato, Child Desmond & Price Timothy James
- Producer: Rock Mafia

"Go" is a song by American group the McClain Sisters. It premiered on August 3, 2012 and was released as a digital download on November 6, 2012. The song was written by Antonia Armato, Child Desmond & Price Timothy James and produced by Rock Mafia.

The song received positive reviews from music critics, praising the song's unique sound and also McClain Sisters's vocals, which have been compared to Rihanna and Jonas Brothers.

== Background, composition and release ==
A midtempo Pop song, "Go" exhibits elements of dance-pop and synthpop. Built on a beat, multi-tracked harmonies, the song's instrumentation includes slow-bouncing keyboard tones, and drums. The song was written by Antonia Armato, Child Desmond & Price Timothy James and produced by Rock Mafia. Lyrically, the song gives ode to perseverance in wishes and the end of the world. In interview for Black Starz, the sisters commented:

We're wrapping it up. I know we always say that, but we didn't realize how much can go into it though. But we are officially wrapping it up and we're going to put some music out there soon. We're excited.

In the same interview, Lauryn Alisa McClain commented on the expectations about the song. "It's going to sound different but I think you guys are going to like it. I'm excited for everyone to hear what we have going on.". "Go" was released for radio premiere on November 2, 2012. The song was released for digital download on November 6.

== Critical reception ==
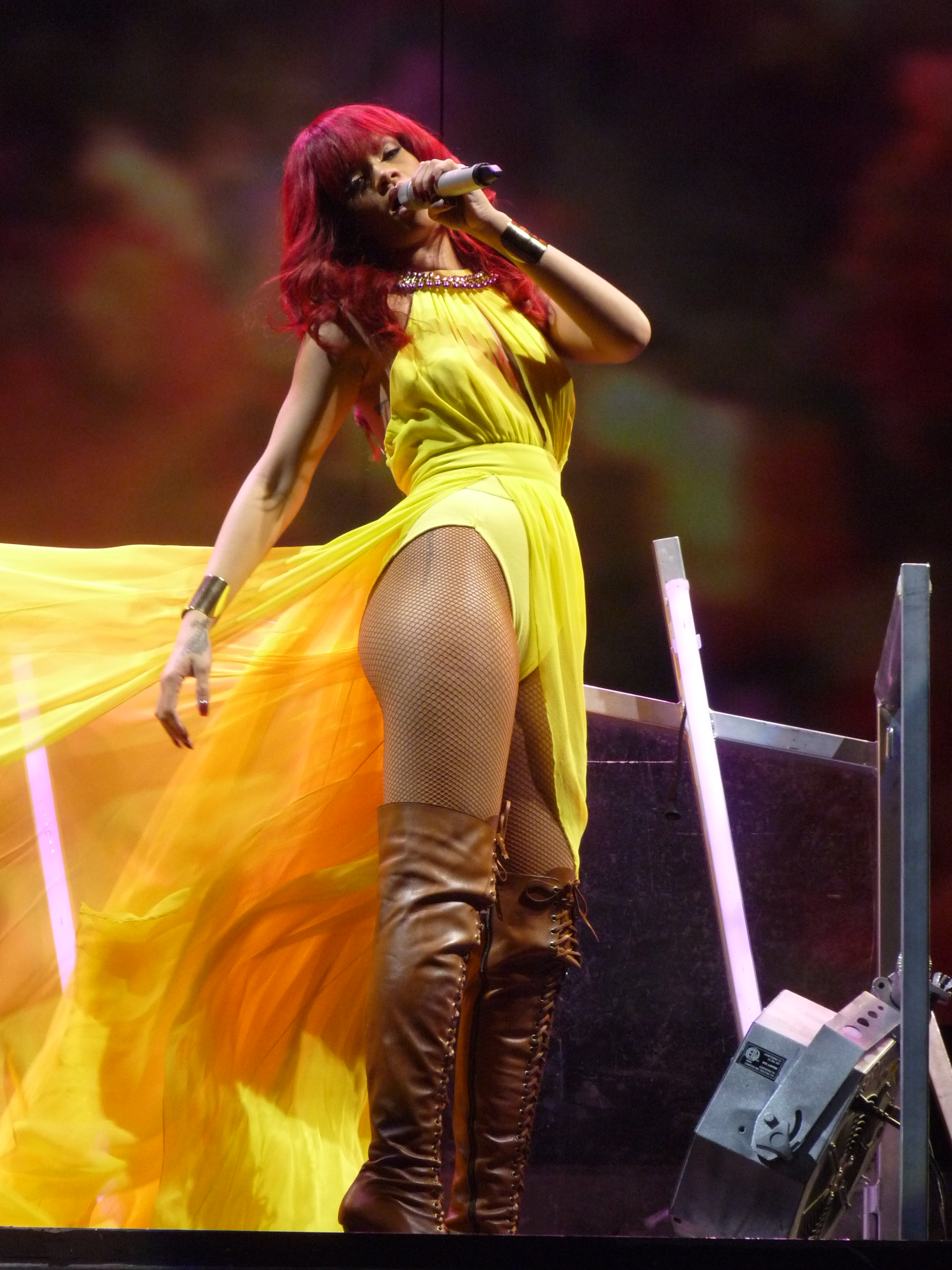
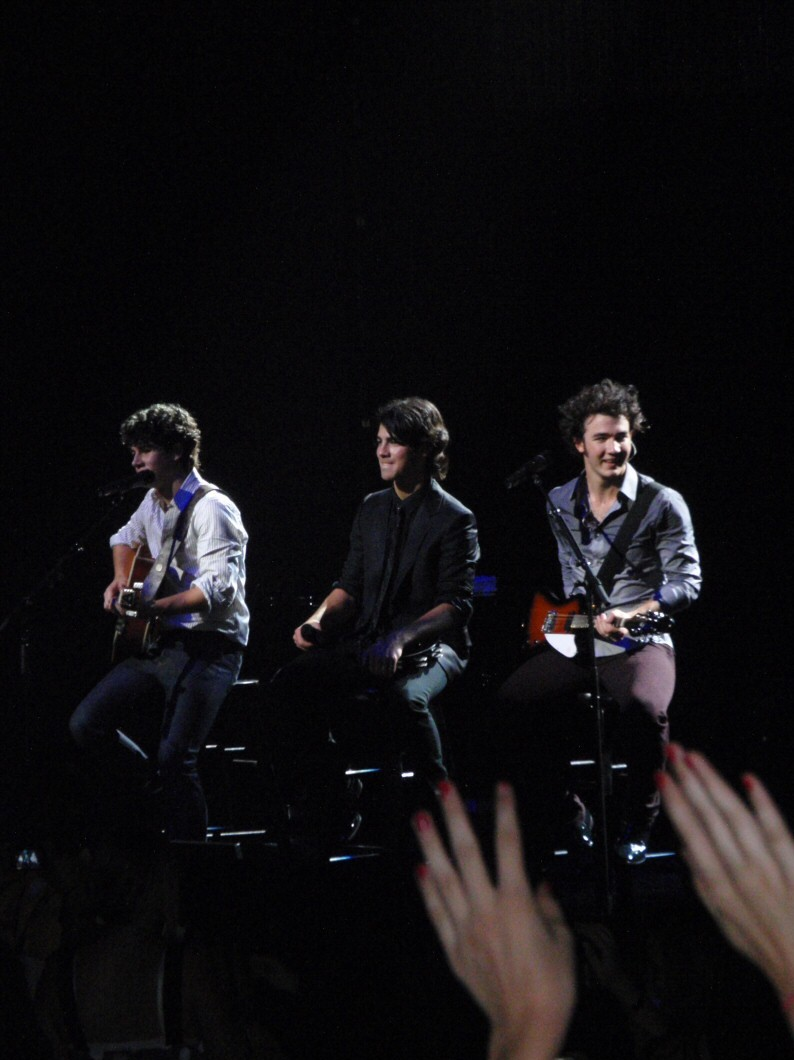
"Go" was compared to Rihanna and Jonas

The song received positive reviews from music critics. Toria to Black Starz said the song has a "really good message". The Pop State compared "Go" to dance songs of Rihanna, but in a version 'Jonas Brothers girls'.

To Fanlala the song is contagious and energizing. They said: "We fell in love instantly! "Go" shows exactly what the girls are made of. The song has a very in-your-face feel that makes you want to hop up and dance! With such energy, just make sure you're careful where you're listening to it. The lyrics and music is infectious". Alex Joy to Vip Access was positive and said "I think we all can agree that we can never have too much of the magnificent".

== Track listing ==
- US iTunes single
1. "Go" – 3:13

== Radio and release history ==
Country	Date	Format	Label
United States	November 2, 2012	Radio Disney Premiere	Hollywood Records
United States	November 6, 2012	Digital download	Hollywood Records
Canada	November 6, 2012	Digital download	Hollywood Records
