= Disney Fairies: Faith, Trust, and Pixie Dust =

Compilation album by various artists
- Released: October 16, 2012
- Recorded: 2008–2012
- Genres: Pop; folk-pop; orchestral pop; teen pop; bubblegum pop
- Label: Walt Disney

Disney Fairies: Faith, Trust, and Pixie Dust is a compilation album featuring songs from and inspired by the Disney Fairies film series. It was also used to promote the Secret of the Wings film. The soundtrack was released on October 16, 2012, and contains "The Great Divide" by the McClain Sisters. It also marked the first commercial release of music from Sabrina Carpenter who was 13 when her song "Smile" was released.

The score to the film was composed by Joel McNeely, who scored the first four Tinker Bell films. The songs were written by Brendan Milburn and Valerie Vigoda of GrooveLily. In the movie, Sydney Sierota from Echosmith sings the opening song, "We'll Be There", while the album version is sung by Thia Megia.

== Track listing ==
No.	Title	Recording artist(s)	Length
1.	"The Great Divide"	McClain Sisters	2:59
2.	"We'll Be There"	Thia Megia	3:58
3.	"Dig Down Deeper"	Zendaya	3:01
4.	"Gift of a Friend" (new mix)	Demi Lovato	3:24
5.	"Fly to Your Heart" (new mix)	Selena Gomez	3:12
6.	"How to Believe"	Holly Brook	2:38
7.	"Let Your Heart Sing"	Katharine McPhee	3:47
8.	"Shine"	Laura Marano	3:50
9.	"Smile"	Sabrina Carpenter	3:56
10.	"Magic Mirror"	Tiffany Thornton	3:36

== Chart performance ==
Chart (2012)	Peak position
U.S. Kid Albums	16

== The Great Divide ==
"The Great Divide"

Promotional single by McClain Sisters

from the album Disney Fairies: Faith, Trust, and Pixie Dust
- Released: September 11, 2012
- Recorded: 2012
- Genre: Pop
- Length: 2:59
- Label: Walt Disney
- Songwriters: Brendan Milburn; Valerie Vigoda

"The Great Divide" is a song by American recording artists McClain Sisters from the Disney Fairies film series's compilation Disney Fairies: Faith, Trust, and Pixie Dust. The song was composed by Brendan Milburn and Valerie Vigoda. A music video was also created, interspersed with scenes from the film Secret of the Wings, released on December 12, 2012.

=== Charts ===
Chart (2013)	Peak position
US Kid Digital Songs (Billboard)	4

=== Release history ===
Country	Date	Format	Label
United States	September 11, 2012	Digital download	Walt Disney Records
