= Tyler Perry's House of Payne season 6 =

Tyler Perry's House of Payne
- Season 6
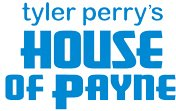
- No. of episodes: 42

Release
- Original network: TBS
- Original release: January 20 – August 10, 2012

Season chronology
- ← Previous; Season 5 Next → Season 7

The sixth season of Tyler Perry's House of Payne began airing on January 20, 2012 and ended, with the series finale, on August 10, 2012, until revival in 2020. It stars LaVan Davis as Curtis Payne, Cassi Davis as Ella Payne, Allen Payne as CJ Payne, Lance Gross as Calvin Payne, Demetria McKinney as Janine Payne, Keshia Knight Pulliam as Miranda Payne and Palmer Williams Jr. who joins the cast as Floyd Jackson, and consists of 42 episodes. It also stars Larramie "Doc" Shaw as Malik and China Anne McClain as Jazmine who are both in a limited number of episodes due to the shows that they also starred in Pair of Kings and A.N.T. Farm.

When the series concluded its original run in 2012, it had produced 254 episodes – more than any other sitcom with an African American cast to date.

== Episodes ==
No. overall	No. in season	Title	Directed by	Written by	Original release date	Prod. code
223	1	"Do or Die"	Tyler Perry	Brian Egeston	January 20, 2012	601
After Christian's Christening, The family gets ready to have one last Sunday dinner at Curtis and Ella's house. Unbeknownst to the family, as they prepare the meal, Calvin has been shot and is laying on C.J. and Janine's floor. Absent: Larramie "Doc" Shaw as Malik and China Anne McClain as Jazmine
224	2	"R.I.P (Rest in Payne)"	Tyler Perry	Brian Egeston	January 20, 2012	602
After being discovered by Janine, Calvin battles for his life at the hospital. Ella's unwavering faith won't let the family get down. Note: This episode was rated TV-14-V Absent: Larramie "Doc" Shaw as Malik and China Anne McClain as Jazmine
225	3	"Payne-ful Survival"	Tyler Perry	Anthony C. Hill	January 27, 2012	603
The Payne family waits for Calvin to wake up, but the fight isn't over. Curtis decides not to move. Absent: Larramie "Doc" Shaw as Malik and China Anne McClain as Jazmine
226	4	"Payneful Recovery"	Tyler Perry	David A. Arnold	January 27, 2012	604
Calvin might get discharged from the hospital after he finally awakened. Curtis attempts to mortgage his house for money to pay Calvin's medical bills. Absent: Larramie "Doc" Shaw as Malik and China Anne McClain as Jazmine
227	5	"House of Nightmares"	Tyler Perry	Robin M. Henry	February 3, 2012	605
Calvin has nightmares about being shot and is uncomfortable at home with Miranda who is overwhelmed with caring for an ailing husband, two kids, a career and home. Ella and Curtis are worried that Calvin isn't receiving proper care and wants him to move in with them. Curtis prepares the house for Calvin. Absent: Larramie "Doc" Shaw as Malik, China Anne McClain as Jazmine and Demetria McKinney as Janine
228	6	"In Payne"	Tyler Perry	Myra J.	February 3, 2012	606
A depressed Calvin admits to Ella that he think he would have been better off dead. The family is very concerned and Curtis has a heart to heart conversation with Calvin. Deshawn's mother visits and wants Deshawn back. Deshawn decides to go live with her. Note: This was Bobb'e J. Thompson's final appearance as Deshawn. Absent: Larramie "Doc" Shaw as Malik, China Anne McClain as Jazmine and Demetria McKinney as Janine
229	7	"Payback"	Kim Fields	Robin M. Henry & Myra J.	February 10, 2012	607
Calvin plans to get revenge on Travis Harris for shooting him. Curtis makes plans with Ella then pretends to be sick when he gets tickets to a baseball game. When footage of Curtis at the game is aired, Curtis does everything he can to keep Ella from finding out. Absent: Larramie "Doc" Shaw as Malik, China Anne McClain as Jazmine and Keshia Knight Pulliam as Miranda
230	8	"Daddy Day Scare"	Kim Fields	Anthony C. Hill	February 10, 2012	608
C.J. is left to look after the twins during the big game. Ella gets in the way of Calvin's transition back home. Note: Beginning with this episode, Palmer Williams Jr., who portrays Floyd joins the main cast Absent: Larramie "Doc" Shaw as Malik and China Anne McClain as Jazmine
231	9	"Pills and Thrills"	Kim Fields	Robin M. Henry	February 17, 2012	609
Calvin is invited back to work, then decides he isn't ready and doesn't show. Floyd has a new girlfriend who looks awfully familiar to Curtis. Curtis realizes he knew the girlfriend, when she was a man. Absent: Larramie "Doc" Shaw as Malik and China Anne McClain as Jazmine
232	10	"Scars of Payne"	Kim Fields	Brian Egeston	February 17, 2012	610
Ella runs a gun buy back program at the Help Center that is threatened by rival gang members. Curtis, bored, wants to volunteer at the Help Center and causes mischief. Absent: Larramie "Doc" Shaw as Malik, China Anne McClain as Jazmine, Palmer Williams Jr. as Floyd and Keshia Knight Pulliam as Miranda
233	11	"Payne vs. Payne"	Kim Fields	David A. Arnold	February 17, 2012	611
Curtis runs for neighborhood watch president. C.J. helps until he realizes he disagrees with some of Curtis's policies. When Curtis challenges C.J., C.J. decides to run himself. Meanwhile, Malik runs up his parents' credit card. Note: Malik makes his return beginning with this episode. Absent: Lance Gross as Calvin, China Anne McClain as Jazmine, Palmer Williams Jr. as Floyd and Keshia Knight Pulliam as Miranda
234	12	"Guess Who Came to Breakfast"	Kim Fields	David A. Arnold	February 17, 2012	612
The family meets Malik's new free-spirited girlfriend, Summer. Absent: Lance Gross as Calvin, China Anne McClain as Jazmine, Palmer Williams Jr. as Floyd and Keshia Knight Pulliam as Miranda
235	13	"House of Forced Closure"	Kim Fields	Myra J.	March 2, 2012	613
Calvin and Miranda's condo gets foreclosed on and they are forced out. Not wanting to turn to his parents again, Calvin and Miranda try to make their own way and end up sleeping in a motel. Curtis tells Calvin to bring his family to their house. Floyd convinces Curtis to steal security service. Absent: Larramie "Doc" Shaw as Malik and China Anne McClain as Jazmine
236	14	"If it Ain't Broke"	Kim Fields	Kevin Garrett	March 2, 2012	614
Ella is preparing to open a battered women's home in the church's unused classrooms, but it is shut down when C.J. cites dangerous fire code violations. Calvin borrows Curtis's car and thinks he put a dent in it. Calvin feels guilty and tries to make up for it and Curtis allows him to. Absent: Larramie "Doc" Shaw as Malik, China Anne McClain as Jazmine, Palmer Williams Jr. as Floyd and Keshia Knight Pulliam as Miranda,
237	15	"Neighborhood Crisis"	Kim Fields	Joseph Hampton	March 9, 2012	615
Malik and Summer volunteer at a crisis hotline. Curtis goes overboard with the neighborhood watch as he tries to catch a criminal. Note: This episode features Larramie "Doc" Shaw talking to viewers about suicide. Absent: Lance Gross as Calvin, China Anne McClain as Jazmine, Palmer Williams Jr. as Floyd and Keshia Knight Pulliam as Miranda
238	16	"Down for the Count"	Chip Hurd	Joseph Hampton	March 9, 2012	616
C.J. is offered perks as a city official. Miranda and Curtis bond. Absent: Lance Gross as Calvin, Larramie "Doc" Shaw as Malik, China Anne McClain as Jazmine and Palmer Williams Jr. as Floyd
239	17	"Stop, Drop and Roll"	Kim Fields	Tanya Hoffler-Moore	May 11, 2012	617
C.J. and Janine have a fight which carries over into the office. Malik takes a class on evolution and doesn't know if he believes in God. Absent: Lance Gross as Calvin, China Anne McClain as Jazmine, Palmer Williams Jr. as Floyd and Keshia Knight Pulliam as Miranda
240	18	"No Pass, No Play"	Chip Hurd	Anthony C. Hill	May 11, 2012	618
Malik tutors an athlete who can barely read. Curtis is overly canind with the newspapers and causes a PR scandal for C.J. and Janine. Note: This episode features Larramie "Doc" Shaw talking to viewers about learning to read. Note: Demetria McKinney is credited as Demetria "Dee Dee" McKinney for the rest of the series. Absent: Lance Gross as Calvin, China Anne McClain as Jazmine, Palmer Williams Jr. as Floyd and Keshia Knight Pulliam as Miranda
241	19	"Payneful Injection"	Chip Hurd	Brian Egeston	May 18, 2012	619
C.J. and Malik bumps heads when Malik leads a protest against a man being put to death. C.J. lead the arson investigation that put the man away. Absent: LaVan Davis as Curtis, Cassi Davis as Ella, China Anne McClain as Jazmine, Palmer Williams Jr. as Floyd and Keshia Knight Pulliam as Miranda
242	20	"Batter Up"	Kim Fields	Myra J.	May 18, 2012	620
Miranda is hurt when she overhears Curtis and Ella talking bad about her. C.J.'s department enjoys the softball team until a horrible Janine wants to join. Absent: Lance Gross as Calvin, Larramie "Doc" Shaw as Malik, China Anne McClain as Jazmine and Palmer Williams Jr. as Floyd
243	21	"Payneful Matrimony"	Chip Hurd	David A. Arnold	May 25, 2012	621
C.J gives Malik advice which leads to Malik marrying Summer. Calvin and Miranda have a hard time adjusting to living with Curtis and Ella. Absent: China Anne McClain as Jazmine, Demetria McKinney as Janine and Palmer Williams Jr. as Floyd
244	22	"What You Know About Me"	Chip Hurd	Anthony C. Hill	May 25, 2012	622
C.J., Janine and Miranda have a party and don't invite Curtis and Ella. Malik and Summer argue over an obscure anniversary. Note: Bernard Jones reprises his role from Meet the Browns as Milo in this episode. Absent: Lance Gross as Calvin, China Anne McClain as Jazmine and Palmer Williams Jr. as Floyd
245	23	"Right Turn"	Chip Hurd	Myra J.	June 1, 2012	623
Curtis does community service at the Help Center. Miranda doesn't invite Janine to a concert. Absent: Lance Gross as Calvin, Larramie "Doc" Shaw as Malik, China Anne McClain as Jazmine and Palmer Williams Jr. as Floyd
246	24	"The Loan Ranger"	Chip Hurd	Brian Egeston	June 1, 2012	624
Malik finds out his friend is gay. Curtis loans Ella money. Absent: China Anne McClain as Jazmine and Palmer Williams Jr. as Floyd
247	25	"Payneful Divorce"	Chip Hurd	David A. Arnold	June 8, 2012	625
Malik and Summer have their marriage annulled. Miranda temps at the office when Janine needs an assistant. Note: Bernard Jones reprises his role from Meet the Browns as Milo in this episode. Absent: LaVan Davis as Curtis, Cassi Davis as Ella, Lance Gross as Calvin, China Anne McClain as Jazmine and Palmer Williams Jr. as Floyd
248	26	"Up to the Challenge"	Kim Fields	Joseph Hampton	June 8, 2012	626
Malik takes caffeine pills irresponsibly and Curtis subs for Ella at a Help Center training program. Absent: Lance Gross as Calvin, China Anne McClain as Jazmine, Palmer Williams Jr. as Floyd and Keshia Knight Pulliam as Miranda
249	27	"House of Sabotage"	Kim Fields	Chrystal Ellzy	June 15, 2012	627
Janine and Miranda co-chair a Help Center event and all they do is fight. Malik doesn't want to stop wearing his wedding ring. Note: This episode features Keshia Knight Pulliam and Demetria McKinney talking to viewers about helping poor countries. Note: This was Larramie "Doc" Shaw's final appearance as Malik. Absent: Lance Gross as Calvin, China Anne McClain as Jazmine and Palmer Williams Jr. as Floyd
250	28	"Payneful Pop In"	Kim Fields	David A. Arnold	June 15, 2012	628
Curtis and Ella keep popping in unannounced to C.J. and Janine's house. Jazmine is accused of cheating on an exam; she's covering for a friend. Note: Jazmine makes her return beginning with this episode. Absent: Lance Gross as Calvin, Palmer Williams Jr. as Floyd and Keshia Knight Pulliam as Miranda
251	29	"House of OMG"	Kim Fields	Brian Egeston	June 22, 2012	629
C.J. takes action when technology takes over the family. Absent: Lance Gross as Calvin, Palmer Williams Jr. as Floyd and Keshia Knight Pulliam as Miranda
252	30	"Keep It Moving"	Kim Fields	Robin M. Henry & Myra J.	June 22, 2012	630
C.J. coaches Jazmine's soccer team. Absent: Cassi Davis as Ella, Lance Gross as Calvin, Palmer Williams Jr. as Floyd and Keshia Knight Pulliam as Miranda
253	31	"Bake, Rattle and Roll"	Kim Fields	Brian Egeston	June 29, 2012	631
Calvin's behavior at work gets him suspended. Meanwhile, Jazmine wants Ella to teach her how to bake. Absent: Palmer Williams Jr. as Floyd
254	32	"Dodging Bullies"	Chip Hurd	David A. Arnold	June 29, 2012	632
Jazmine stands up to a cyber bully. Meanwhile, Miranda and Calvin have a pregnancy scare. Absent: Palmer Williams Jr. as Floyd
255	33	"Payneful Distance"	Chip Hurd	Joseph Hampton	July 6, 2012	633
Calvin takes Miranda's money and goes to a strip club. C.J. gives Janine a bad evaluation. Absent: China Anne McClain as Jazmine and Palmer Williams Jr. as Floyd
256	34	"Not in the Cards"	Chip Hurd	Robin M. Henry & Myra J.	July 6, 2012	634
Floyd decides to host a night of fun and gambling at the Help Center, and Curtis gets quickly sucked in by the casino-like atmosphere and games. Jazmine lands herself in some serious trouble for talking during class time. Absent: Lance Gross as Calvin, and Keshia Knight Pulliam as Miranda
257	35	"All Work and No Play"	Chip Hurd	Tony Rhone	July 20, 2012	635
Calvin and Miranda anticipates the prospects of having their own place. Jazmine job shadows the PR office with C.J. and Janine. Absent: Palmer Williams Jr. as Floyd
258	36	"Amazing Matriarchs"	Chip Hurd	Brian Egeston	July 20, 2012	636
Ella receives news of the death of her mother Eunice. Guest Star: Janet Hubert-Whitten as Evie Absent: Demetria McKinney as Janine and Keshia Knight Pulliam as Miranda
259	37	"The First Dance"	Tyler Perry	Story by : David A. Arnold; Teleplay by : David A. Arnold & Tyler Perry	July 27, 2012	637
Jazmine asks C.J. to go to the school dance with a boy. Note: This was China Anne McClain's final appearance as Jazmine. Absent: Cassi Davis as Ella, Lance Gross as Calvin, Demetria McKinney as Janine, Palmer Williams Jr. as Floyd and Keshia Knight Pulliam as Miranda
260	38	"The Invention of Trust"	Chip Hurd	Anthony C. Hill	July 27, 2012	638
Floyd's new invention causes friction between him and Curtis. Calvin questions Miranda about an unusual amount in her bank account. Absent: Demetria McKinney as Janine
261	39	"Payneful Realization"	Tyler Perry	Anthony C. Hill	August 3, 2012	639
Calvin and Miranda try to save their marriage before it becomes too late. Absent: Allen Payne as C.J., Demetria McKinney as Janine and Palmer Williams Jr. as Floyd
262	40	"Trial and Tribulation"	Chip Hurd	Joseph Hampton	August 3, 2012	640
Calvin faces his shooter Travis Harris in court when the shooter's trial finally arrives. Absent: Demetria McKinney as Janine
263	41	"The Call Back"	Chip Hurd	Story by : David A. Arnold; Teleplay by : Joseph Hampton & Anthony C. Hill	August 10, 2012	641
Curtis must deal with resentment after he is called back to work. Floyd learns important details of his heritage. Absent: Lance Gross as Calvin, Demetria McKinney as Janine and Keshia Knight Pulliam as Miranda
264	42	"All's Well"	Chip Hurd	Myra J.	August 10, 2012	642
Calvin and C.J. plan an anniversary celebration for Miranda and Janine. Miranda has to make a tough decision whether or not she stays with Calvin. In the end, Miranda decides to get a divorce from Calvin and walks out on him. The series ends when Calvin throws a vase of flowers at the door. Note: This is the final episode aired on TBS, The show will return, as revival on BET for the 7th season.
