= Guess Who's Not Coming to Dinner =

Guess Who's Not Coming to Dinner may refer to:

== Television ==
- "Guess Who's Not Coming to Dinner?", an episode of the Australian sitcom Hey Dad..!
- "Guess Who's Not Coming to Dinner?", an episode of the American drama The Secret Life of the American Teenager
- "Guess Who's Not Coming to Dinner?", an episode of the British drama Table 12, starring Edward Olive, Ben Price, Gwen Taylor, and Marsha Thomason

=== American live-action sitcom ===
- "Guess Who's Not Coming to Dinner" (Will & Grace), an episode of Will & Grace
- "Guess Who's Not Coming to Dinner" (Yes, Dear), an episode of Yes, Dear
- "Guess Who's Not Coming to Dinner?", an episode of The New Adventures of Old Christine
- "Guess Who's Not Coming to Dinner?", an episode of The Jeffersons
- "Guess Who's Not Coming to Dinner?", an episode of The Steve Harvey Show
- "Guess Who's Not Coming to Dinner", an episode of Living Dolls
- "Guess Who's Not Coming to Dinner?", an episode of The Jamie Foxx Show
- "Guess Who's Not Coming to Dinner?", an episode of an American version of Holding the Baby, starring Jon Patrick Walker, Jennifer Westfeldt, and Eddie McClintock
- "Guess Who's Not Coming to Dinner?", an episode of Headmaster, starring Andy Griffith

== See also ==
- Guess Who's Coming to Dinner (disambiguation)
- Guess Who's Coming to Breakfast (disambiguation)
- Guess Who's Coming to Lunch (disambiguation)
- Guess Who's Coming to Visit (disambiguation)
- "Guess Who's Knott Coming to Dinner?", an episode of the hour-long animated series The New Scooby-Doo Movies
