= Guess Who's Coming to Dinner (disambiguation) =

Guess Who's Coming to Dinner is a 1967 American film.

Guess Who's Coming to Dinner may also refer to:

== Television ==
=== Canada ===
- "Guess Who's Coming to Dinner", an 18 to Life episode
- "Guess Who's Coming to Dinner", a The Best Years episode
- "Guess Who’s Coming to Dinner?", a Dinner Party Wars episode
- "Guess Who's Coming to Dinner", a Sophie episode

=== United Kingdom ===
- "Guess Who's Coming to Dinner" (Citizen Smith), a 1977 episode
- "Guess Who's Coming to Dinner?", a Close to Home episode
- "Guess Who's Coming to Dinner?", a The Cuckoo Waltz episode
- "Guess Who's Coming to Dinner", a No, Honestly episode
- "Guess Who's Coming to Dinner?" (This Life), a 1997 episode
- "Guess Who's Coming to Dinner?", a Whatever Happened to the Likely Lads? episode

=== United States ===
- "Guess Who's Coming to Dinner", a Baywatch episode
- "Guess Who's Coming to Dinner", a Braxton Family Values episode
- "Guess Who's Coming to Dinner?", a The Brothers Garcia episode
- "Guess Who's Coming to Dinner" (Dawson's Creek)
- "Guess Who's Coming to Dinner (Honkey Edition)", an Elvis and Slick Monty episode
- "Guess Who's Coming to Dinner?", an Empty Nest episode, guest-starring Phil Hartman
- "Guess Who's Coming to Dinner?", a The Facts of Life episode
- "Guess Who's Coming to Dinner" (Grey's Anatomy)
- "Guess Who's Coming to Dinner?", a Growing Pains episode
- "Guess Who's Coming to Dinner?", a Hudson Street episode
- "The Buttmans: Guess Who's Coming to Dinner?", an In Living Color sketch
- "Guess Who's Coming to Dinner?", a The Joe Schmo Show episode
- "Guess Who's Coming to Dinner?", a Kyle XY episode
- "Guess Who's Coming to Dinner?", a Last Man Standing episode
- "Guess Who's Coming to Dinner?", a The Life and Times of Eddie Roberts episode
- "Guess Who's Coming to Dinner?", a One World episode, guest starring James Avery
- "Guess Who's Coming to Dinner" (Scandal)
- "Guess Who's Coming to Dinner", a The Secret Diary of Desmond Pfeiffer episode
- "Guess Who's Coming to Dinner?", a Step by Step episode
- "Guess Who's Coming to Dinner", a Thunder Alley episode
- "Guess Who's Coming to Dinner?", a Tyler Perry's House of Payne episode
- "Guess Who's Coming to Dinner?", a Working Girl episode

=== Other countries ===
- "Guess Who's Coming to Dinner", a McLeod's Daughters episode
- Guess Who's Coming to Dinner?, a New Zealand programme broadcast by TVNZ

== Music ==
- Guess Who's Coming to Dinner (album), by Black Uhuru
- Guess Who's Comin' to Dinner?, an album by DJ Cash Money
- Guess Who's Coming to Dinner?, an album by King Gordy with Fat Killahz
- "Guess Who's Coming to Dinner", a single by Dr. Alban

== Film ==
- Guess Who's Coming to Dinner, a film screened at the 1993 Tokyo International Lesbian & Gay Film Festival

== See also ==
- "Guess Hoe's Coming to Dinner", a The Boondocks episode
- "We're Coming to Dinner", a song by The Guess Who
- Guess Who's Coming for Dinner (disambiguation)
- Guess Who's Not Coming to Dinner (disambiguation)
- Guess Who (disambiguation)
- Guess Who's Coming to Breakfast (disambiguation)
- Guess Who's Coming to Lunch (disambiguation)
- Guess Who's Coming to Skinner, 2025 episode of The Simpsons
- Guess Who's Coming to Visit (disambiguation)
