= Tyler Perry's House of Payne season 7 =

Tyler Perry's House of Payne
- Season 7
- No. of episodes: 25

Release
- Original network: BET
- Original release: September 2, 2020 – January 13, 2021

Season chronology
- ← Previous; Season 6 Next → Season 8

The seventh season of Tyler Perry's House of Payne began airing on September 2, 2020, and ended on January 13, 2021. It stars LaVan Davis as Curtis Payne, Cassi Davis as Ella Payne, Lance Gross as Calvin Payne, China Anne McClain as Jazmine Payne, Larramie "Doc" Shaw as Malik Payne, Keshia Knight Pulliam as Miranda Payne and Allen Payne as CJ Payne. Demetria McKinney stars in a recurring role this season.

== Cast and characters ==
=== Main ===
- Lavan Davis as Curtis Payne
- Cassi Davis as Ella Payne
- Lance Gross as Calvin Payne
- China Anne McClain as Jazmine Payne
- Larramie "Doc" Shaw as Malik Payne
- Keshia Knight Pulliam as Miranda Payne
- Allen Payne as CJ Payne

=== Recurring ===
- Palmer Williams Jr. as Floyd Jackson

== Episodes ==
No. overall	No. in season	Title	Directed by	Written by	Original release date	Prod. code	U.S. viewers (millions)
265	1	"A Wise Man's Opinion"	Tyler Perry	Tyler Perry	September 2, 2020	701	0.92
Note: Though this season picks up eight years after the series ended on WBD's TBS and two years after the cancellation of The Paynes on OWN, little time has passed in-universe continuing from Season 6 and ignoring The Paynes.
266	2	"Delicious"	Tyler Perry	Tyler Perry	September 2, 2020	702	1.09
267	3	"By Your Side"	Tyler Perry	Tyler Perry	September 9, 2020	703	0.84
268	4	"The Old People Game"	Tyler Perry	Tyler Perry	September 9, 2020	704	0.94
269	5	"Women of Today"	Tyler Perry	Tyler Perry	September 16, 2020	705	0.77
270	6	"Mixed Emotions"	Tyler Perry	Tyler Perry	September 16, 2020	706	0.90
271	7	"Love and Hate"	Tyler Perry	Tyler Perry	September 23, 2020	707	0.71
272	8	"From Heart to Heart"	Tyler Perry	Tyler Perry	September 23, 2020	708	0.90
273	9	"Someone"	Tyler Perry	Tyler Perry	September 30, 2020	709	0.75
274	10	"Something's Rotten"	Tyler Perry	Tyler Perry	September 30, 2020	710	0.92
275	11	"Hard Lessons"	Tyler Perry	Tyler Perry	October 7, 2020	711	0.76
276	12	"Lucky Cards"	Tyler Perry	Tyler Perry	October 14, 2020	712	0.86
277	13	"Moving On"	Tyler Perry	Tyler Perry	October 21, 2020	713	0.93
278	14	"Been A Long Time"	Tyler Perry	Tyler Perry	October 28, 2020	714	0.80
Note: This episode reveals that the events of The Paynes was all a dream Curtis had.
279	15	"J. Boogie"	Tyler Perry	Tyler Perry	November 4, 2020	715	0.89
280	16	"The Dinosaur and the Rabbit"	Tyler Perry	Tyler Perry	November 11, 2020	716	0.77
281	17	"Dark Thirty"	Tyler Perry	Tyler Perry	November 18, 2020	717	0.73
282	18	"Out of Character"	Tyler Perry	Tyler Perry	November 25, 2020	718	0.80
283	19	"The Package"	Tyler Perry	Tyler Perry	December 2, 2020	719	0.87
284	20	"If You Loved Me"	Tyler Perry	Tyler Perry	December 9, 2020	720	0.92
285	21	"The Big Game"	Tyler Perry	Tyler Perry	December 16, 2020	721	0.94
286	22	"Give and Take"	Tyler Perry	Tyler Perry	December 23, 2020	722	1.00
287	23	"Parenting 101"	Tyler Perry	Tyler Perry	December 30, 2020	723	0.80
288	24	"Ya' Hearrrd Me"	Mark E. Swinton	Tyler Perry	January 6, 2021	724	0.66
289	25	"Woman of the Night"	Mark E. Swinton	Mark E. Swinton	January 13, 2021	725	0.63
