= Tyler Perry's House of Payne season 8 =

Tyler Perry's House of Payne
- Season 8
- No. of episodes: 22

Release
- Original network: BET
- Original release: May 25, 2021 – January 18, 2022

Season chronology
- ← Previous; Season 7 Next → Season 9

The eighth season of Tyler Perry's House of Payne began airing on May 25, 2021 and concluded on January 18, 2022. It stars LaVan Davis as Curtis Payne, Cassi Davis as Ella Payne, Allen Payne as CJ Payne, Lance Gross as Calvin Payne, Larramie "Doc" Shaw as Malik Payne, Keshia Knight Pulliam as Miranda Payne and Palmer Williams Jr. as Floyd Jackson, and consists of 22 episodes. Demetria McKinney as Janine Payne and China Anne McClain as Jazmine Payne do not appear this season.

== Cast and characters ==
=== Main ===
- Lavan Davis as Curtis Payne
- Cassi Davis as Ella Payne
- Lance Gross as Calvin Payne
- Larramie "Doc" Shaw as Malik Payne
- Keshia Knight Pulliam as Miranda Payne
- Palmer Williams Jr. as Floyd Jackson
- Allen Payne as CJ Payne

== Episodes ==
No. overall	No. in season	Title	Directed by	Written by	Original release date	Prod. code	U.S. viewers (millions)
Part 1
290	1	"Whiplash"	Mark E. Swinton	Brian Egeston	May 25, 2021	801	0.56
The family learns that C.J. ran into a burning building.
291	2	"A Payneful Lesson"	Mark E. Swinton	Deance Wyatt	June 1, 2021	802	0.59
Calvin shows Laura how wonderful their marriage will be.
292	3	"All Lumped Together"	Derrick Doose	Chrystal Ellzy	June 8, 2021	803	0.62
293	4	"Back That Thang Up"	Mark E. Swinton	Myra J.	June 15, 2021	804	0.62
294	5	"Sauce Bosses"	Mark E. Swinton	Brian Egeston	June 22, 2021	805	0.55
295	6	"Missing Mustard Seeds"	Derrick Doose	Brian Egeston	June 29, 2021	806	0.52
296	7	"In The Hot Seat"	Derrick Doose	Chrystal Ellzy	July 6, 2021	807	0.51
297	8	"Karen"	Derrick Doose	Sabrina Campbell	July 13, 2021	808	0.57
Part 2
298	9	"Me Against the World"	Derrick Doose	Chrystal Ellzy	October 12, 2021	809	0.62
299	10	"Pow Wow at the Paynes"	Derrick Doose	Myra J.	October 19, 2021	810	0.50
300	11	"Bearer of Bad News"	Derrick Doose	Brian Egeston	October 26, 2021	811	0.52
301	12	"Fake Newsletters"	Mark E. Swinton	Myra J.	November 2, 2021	812	0.46
302	13	"Home Invaders"	Derrick Doose	Tyler Perry	November 9, 2021	813	0.49
303	14	"DNAin't"	Derrick Doose	Brian Egeston	November 16, 2021	814	0.50
304	15	"Stop Shop And Roll"	Derrick Doose	Myra J.	November 23, 2021	815	0.53
305	16	"Paynefully Honest"	Derrick Doose	Chrystal Ellzy	November 30, 2021	816	0.71
306	17	"Wondering Prince"	Derrick Doose	Brian Egeston	December 7, 2021	817	0.49
307	18	"A Little Discipline"	Mark E. Swinton	April Powell	December 14, 2021	818	0.55
308	19	"A Payneful Compromise"	Derrick Doose	Leno L. Bradby Jr.	December 21, 2021	819	0.55
309	20	"Fine Wine"	Mark E. Swinton	Lance Gross	January 4, 2022	820	0.48
310	21	"The First Day"	Derrick Doose	Myra J.	January 11, 2022	821	0.52
311	22	"Payneful Suffering"	Mark E. Swinton	Brian Egeston	January 18, 2022	822	0.64
