= Guess Who's Coming to Visit =

Guess Who's Coming to Visit may refer to:

- "Guess Who's Coming to Visit?", an episode of the sitcom Happy Days
- "Guess Who's Coming to Visit?", an episode of the animated series Maggie and the Ferocious Beast

== See also ==
- Guess Who's Coming to Breakfast (disambiguation)
- Guess Who's Coming to Lunch (disambiguation)
- Guess Who's Coming to Dinner (disambiguation)
- "Guess Who's Coming to Guest Star", an episode of the television series Sonny with a Chance
- "Guess Who's Coming to Christmas", an episode of the sitcom Happy Days
- "Guess Who's Not Coming to Christmas?", an episode of the television sitcom 227
- "Guess Who's Coming to the Wedding?", an episode of the television series The Golden Girls
- Guess Who's Coming To Decorate, a television series produced by True Entertainment, a subsidiary of Endemol
- "Guess Who's Going to Be a Bride?", a two-part episode of the television series I Dream of Jeannie
