= List of Tyler Perry's House of Payne episodes =

Tyler Perry's House of Payne is an American comedy-drama television series created and produced by playwright, director, and producer Tyler Perry. The show revolved around a multi-generational family living under one roof in Atlanta led by patriarch Curtis Payne and his wife Ella. The show premiered in syndication on June 21, 2006, and new episodes were broadcast exclusively on TBS from June 6, 2007, until August 10, 2012. While primarily a comedy sitcom, House of Payne was known for featuring dark themes and subject matter, such as substance abuse and addiction. It also had elements of slapstick. The storyline of the show is serialized, with many references to past episodes, creating a continuing story arc.

Since its revival in 2020, House of Payne aired more episodes — a total of 397 — more than any other television series (of any genre) with a predominantly African American cast, surpassing The Jeffersons (253 episodes), Family Matters (215 episodes), and The Cosby Show (202 episodes).

== Series overview ==
Season	Episodes		Originally released		
Season	Episodes		First released	Last released	Network
1	10		June 21, 2006	July 19, 2006	Syndication
2	100	37	June 6, 2007	September 26, 2007	TBS
2	100	22	December 5, 2007	January 30, 2008	TBS
2	100	16	March 5, 2008	April 23, 2008	TBS
2	100	25	June 4, 2008	August 4, 2008	TBS
3	26		December 3, 2008	June 3, 2009	TBS
4	46		November 4, 2009	January 19, 2011	TBS
5	40	20	March 30, 2011	June 15, 2011	TBS
5	40	20	October 21, 2011	January 13, 2012	TBS
6	42		January 20, 2012	August 10, 2012	TBS
7	25		September 2, 2020	January 13, 2021	BET
8	22		May 25, 2021	January 18, 2022	BET
9	22		March 23, 2022	December 28, 2022	BET
10	22		March 22, 2023	September 6, 2023	BET
11	22	16	August 13, 2024	December 17, 2024	BET
11	22	6	March 25, 2025	April 16, 2025	BET
12	23	10	April 30, 2025	July 2, 2025	BET
12	23	7	November 5, 2025	December 17, 2025	BET
12	23	6	February 4, 2026	March 11, 2026	BET

== Episodes ==
=== Season 1 (2006–2007) ===
No. overall	No. in season	Title	Original release date	Prod. code
1	1	"The Roof is On Fire"	June 21, 2006	101
2	2	"When the Smoke Clears Out"	June 21, 2006	102
3	3	"The Invasion (Part 1)"	June 28, 2006	103
4	4	"Take It Or Leave It (The Invasion: Part 2)"	June 28, 2006	104
5	5	"Home Alone"	July 5, 2006	105
6	6	"I've Got the Hook Up (Home Alone: Part 2)"	July 5, 2006	106
7	7	"Ella's War"	July 12, 2006	107
8	8	"No Place Like Home"	July 12, 2006	108
9	9	"Divided We Fall"	July 19, 2006	109
10	10	"Big Baller, Shot Caller"	July 19, 2006	110

=== Season 2 (2007–2008) ===
No. overall	No. in season	Title	Directed by	Written by	Original release date	Prod. code
Part 1
11	1	"Bully and the Beast"	Tyler Perry	Kellie R. Griffin	June 6, 2007	201
12	2	"I Can Cry If I Want To"	Tyler Perry	Michelle L. Johnson	June 6, 2007	202
13	3	"More Than Meets the Eye"	Tyler Perry	Christopher J. Moore	June 13, 2007	203
14	4	"Busted"	Tyler Perry	Jenee V. Giles	June 13, 2007	204
15	5	"Lost and Found"	Tyler Perry	Carmelita Arroyo	June 20, 2007	205
16	6	"Down and Outted"	Tyler Perry	Christopher J. Moore	June 20, 2007	206
17	7	"No Money, Mo' Problems"	Tyler Perry	Anita M. Cal	June 27, 2007	207
18	8	"Just Say No"	Tyler Perry	Steve Coulter, Dee Wagner	June 27, 2007	208
19	9	"Surprise, Surprise"	Tyler Perry	Shontell McClain	July 4, 2007	209
20	10	"Father Knows Best"	Tyler Perry	Joseph Hampton	July 4, 2007	210
21	11	"I Keep Coming Up Short"	Tyler Perry	Teri Jackson	July 11, 2007	211
22	12	"The Buck Stops Here"	Tyler Perry	Carmelita Arroyo	July 11, 2007	212
23	13	"Wax On, Wax Off"	Tyler Perry	Anita M. Cal	July 18, 2007	213
24	14	"Head of the Class"	Tyler Perry	Steve Coulter, Dee Wagner	July 18, 2007	214
25	15	"Paternity and Fraternity: Part 1"	Tyler Perry	Kellie R. Griffin	July 25, 2007	215
26	16	"Paternity and Fraternity: Part 2"	Tyler Perry	Kellie R. Griffin	July 25, 2007	216
27	17	"Cracking Under Pressure"	Tyler Perry	Lamont Ferrell	August 1, 2007	217
28	18	"Club PCP"	Tyler Perry	Kellie R. Griffin	August 1, 2007	218
29	19	"Sadly Mistaken"	Tyler Perry	Teri Jackson	August 8, 2007	219
30	20	"And Justice for All"	Tyler Perry	Lamont Ferrell	August 8, 2007	220
31	21	"I Got the Hook Up"	Tyler Perry	Teri Jackson	August 15, 2007	221
32	22	"Absolutely Positive"	Tyler Perry	Joseph Hampton	August 15, 2007	222
33	23	"Teacher's Pet"	Tyler Perry	Anita M. Cal	August 22, 2007	223
34	24	"The Perfect Storm"	Tyler Perry	Christopher J. Moore	August 22, 2007	224
35	25	"Sad, Sad Leroy Brown: Part 1"	Tyler Perry	Steve Coulter, Dee Wagner	August 29, 2007	225
36	26	"Sad, Sad Leroy Brown: Part 2"	Tyler Perry	Kellie R. Griffin	August 29, 2007	226
37	27	"Weeping May Endure for a Night"	Tyler Perry	Kellie R. Griffin, Joseph Hampton	September 5, 2007	227
38	28	"The Big Test"	Tyler Perry	Steve Coulter, Dee Wagner	September 5, 2007	228
39	29	"Balancing Act"	Tyler Perry	Kellie R. Griffin	September 12, 2007	229
40	30	"Why Can't We Be Friends"	Tyler Perry	Steve Coulter, Dee Wagner	September 12, 2007	230
41	31	"Dog Day Afternoon"	Tyler Perry	Christopher J. Moore	September 19, 2007	231
42	32	"New Beginnings"	Tyler Perry	Kellie R. Griffin	September 19, 2007	232
43	33	"Heavy Petting"	Tyler Perry	Carmelita Arroyo	September 19, 2007	233
44	34	"The Fast and the Furious"	Tyler Perry	Michelle L. Johnson	September 19, 2007	234
45	35	"Gone in 60 Seconds"	Tyler Perry	Teri Jackson	September 26, 2007	235
46	36	"Lost Without U"	Tyler Perry	Carmelita Arroyo	September 26, 2007	236
47	37	"I Rest My Case"	Tyler Perry	Lamont Ferrell	September 26, 2007	237
Part 2
48	38	"A House Is Not a Home"	Tyler Perry	Michelle L. Johnson	December 5, 2007	238
49	39	"Home Alone"	Tyler Perry	Teri Jackson	December 5, 2007	239
50	40	"The Wench Who Saved Christmas"	Tyler Perry	Jenée V. Giles	December 5, 2007	240
51	41	"Trial by Fire: Part 1"	Tyler Perry	Steve Coulter, Dee Wagner	December 5, 2007	241
52	42	"Trial by Fire: Part 2"	Tyler Perry	Joseph Hampton, Dani Renee	December 12, 2007	242
53	43	"Trial by Fire: Part 3"	Tyler Perry	Joseph Hampton, Dani Renee	December 12, 2007	243
54	44	"Crazy In Love"	Tyler Perry	Michelle L. Johnson	December 12, 2007	244
55	45	"Reality Check"	Tyler Perry	Joseph Hampton, Christopher J. Moore	December 12, 2007	245
56	46	"Piece of Mind"	Tyler Perry	Brandon Broussard, Dani Renee	December 19, 2007	246
57	47	"There's No Place Like Home"	Tyler Perry	Teri Jackson	December 19, 2007	247
58	48	"Mommie Dearest"	Tyler Perry	Kellie R. Griffin	December 26, 2007	248
59	49	"You Big Dummy"	Tyler Perry	Lamont Ferrell	December 26, 2007	249
60	50	"It's a Boy"	Tyler Perry	Joseph Hampton	January 2, 2008	250
61	51	"Aches and Paynes"	Tyler Perry	Brandon Broussard	January 2, 2008	251
62	52	"The Big Bang Theory"	Tyler Perry	Christopher J. Moore	January 9, 2008	252
63	53	"Step It Up"	Tyler Perry	Jenee V. Giles, Christopher J. Moore	January 9, 2008	253
64	54	"No Payne, No Gain"	Tyler Perry	Steve Coulter, Dee Wagner	January 16, 2008	254
65	55	"Devil in a Blue Suit"	Tyler Perry	Jenee V. Giles	January 16, 2008	255
66	56	"Bad Influence"	Tyler Perry	Teri Jackson	January 23, 2008	256
67	57	"Play on Playa"	Tyler Perry	Shontell R. McClain	January 23, 2008	257
68	58	"It's Getting Hot in Here"	Tyler Perry	Myra J.	January 30, 2008	258
69	59	"Don't Get It Twisted"	Tyler Perry	Kellie R. Griffin	January 30, 2008	259
Part 3
70	60	"Wife Swap"	Tyler Perry	Kellie R. Griffin	March 5, 2008	260
71	61	"Stop Being All Funky"	Tyler Perry	Kellie R. Griffin, Jenee V. Giles	March 5, 2008	261
72	62	"Guess Who's Coming to Dinner?"	Tyler Perry	J.D. Walker	March 12, 2008	262
73	63	"Game Over"	Tyler Perry	Buddy Lewis	March 12, 2008	263
74	64	"Can I Get A Witness?"	Tyler Perry	Teri Jackson	March 19, 2008	264
75	65	"Commencement Day"	Tyler Perry	Steve Coulter, Dee Wagner	March 19, 2008	265
76	66	"A Shock to the System"	Tyler Perry	Lamont Ferrell	March 26, 2008	266
77	67	"Compromising Position"	Tyler Perry	Christopher J. Moore	March 26, 2008	267
78	68	"Moral Dilemma"	Tyler Perry	Joseph Hampton	April 2, 2008	268
79	69	"Sex, Lies and Videotapes"	Tyler Perry	Pamela Brewster	April 2, 2008	269
80	70	"Time to Clean House"	Tyler Perry	Kellie R. Griffin	April 9, 2008	270
81	71	"Living With Liz"	Tyler Perry	Teri Jackson	April 9, 2008	271
82	72	"Beat Down"	Tyler Perry	Shontell R. McClain, Steve Coulter & Dee Wagner	April 16, 2008	272
83	73	"Expectations"	Tyler Perry	Jenee V. Giles	April 16, 2008	273
84	74	"Cheers"	Tyler Perry	Lemelle Frazier	April 23, 2008	274
85	75	"R-E-S-P-E-C-T Me"	Tyler Perry	Joseph Hampton	April 23, 2008	275
Part 4
86	76	"Driving Me Crazy"	Tyler Perry	Lamont Ferrell	June 4, 2008	276
87	77	"Reunited and... It Don't Feel Good"	Tyler Perry	Kellie R. Griffin	June 4, 2008	277
88	78	"What the-?"	Tyler Perry	Jenee V. Giles	June 4, 2008	278
89	79	"Guys' Night Out, Girls' Night In"	Tyler Perry	Jenee V. Giles	June 4, 2008	279
90	80	"How Do You Spell....It's All About Me?"	Tyler Perry	Christopher J. Moore	June 11, 2008	280
91	81	"And...Cut!"	Tyler Perry	Joseph Hampton	June 11, 2008	281
92	82	"Old School vs. New School"	Tyler Perry	T. Smith, III, Joseph Hampton	June 18, 2008	282
93	83	"Fired and Desire"	Tyler Perry	Michelle L. Johnson	June 18, 2008	283
94	84	"Unsung Heroes"	Tyler Perry	Steve Coulter, Dee Wagner	June 25, 2008	284
95	85	"Pissed, Poor and Paranoid"	Tyler Perry	Christopher J. Moore, Teri Jackson	June 25, 2008	285
96	86	"True Lies"	Tyler Perry	Myra J.	July 2, 2008	286
97	87	"That Sounds Sweet"	Tyler Perry	Lamont Ferrell	July 2, 2008	287
98	88	"Meet the Lucases"	Tyler Perry	Joseph Hampton	July 9, 2008	288
99	89	"Out on a Limb"	Tyler Perry	Christopher J. Moore	July 9, 2008	289
100	90	"Can't Buy Me Love"	Tyler Perry	Teri Jackson, Anita M. Cal	July 16, 2008	290
101	91	"To Have and To Hold"	Tyler Perry	Steve Coulter, Dee Wagner, Teri Jackson	July 16, 2008	291
102	92	"Unexpected Results"	Tyler Perry	Jenee V. Giles	July 23, 2008	292
103	93	"Let's Get Ready to Rumble"	Tyler Perry	Anita M. Cal, Lamont Ferrell	July 23, 2008	293
104	94	"Father's Day"	Tyler Perry	Steve Coulter, Dee Wagner	July 30, 2008	294
105	95	"Whose Wedding Is It Anyway?"	Tyler Perry	Teri Jackson	July 30, 2008	295
106	96	"All is Not Lost"	Tyler Perry	Kellie R. Griffin	July 30, 2008	296
107	97	"Party Over Here!"	Tyler Perry	Christopher J. Moore	August 6, 2008	297
108	98	"The Last Supper"	Tyler Perry	Myra J.	August 6, 2008	298
109	99	"We've Come This Far by Faith: Part 1"	Tyler Perry	Jenee V. Giles, Kellie R. Griffin	August 6, 2008	299
110	100	"We've Come This Far by Faith: Part 2"	Tyler Perry	Kellie R. Griffin	August 6, 2008	2100

=== Season 3 (2008–2009) ===
No. overall	No. in season	Title	Directed by	Written by	Original release date	Prod. code
111	1	"Labor Paynes: Part 1"	Tyler Perry	Brandon Broussard	December 3, 2008	301
112	2	"Labor Paynes: Part 2"	Tyler Perry	Teri Jackson	December 3, 2008	302
113	3	"Your Wife's a Payne"	Tyler Perry	Kellie R. Griffin	December 10, 2008	303
114	4	"Casa De Payne"	Tyler Perry	Steve Coulter	December 10, 2008	304
115	5	"It's a Payne Growing Up"	Tyler Perry	Tajamika Paxton and Calvin Brown, Jr.	December 17, 2008	305
116	6	"Payne and Prejudice"	Tyler Perry	Steve Coulter	December 17, 2008	306
107	7	"Payneful News"	Tyler Perry	Joseph Hampton and Lamont Ferrell	February 11, 2009	307
118	8	"Payneful Loss"	Tyler Perry	Christopher J. Moore and Kelly Zimmerman-Green	February 11, 2009	308
119	9	"Payneful Employment"	Tyler Perry	Joseph Hampton	February 18, 2009	309
120	10	"Slightly Payneful Truth"	Tyler Perry	Christopher J. Moore and Calvin Brown, Jr.	February 18, 2009	310
121	11	"Joy and Payne"	Tyler Perry	Joseph Hampton	February 25, 2009	311
122	12	"A Sister's Payne"	Tyler Perry	Brandon Broussard and Christopher J. Moore	February 25, 2009	312
123	13	"A Grand Payne"	Tyler Perry	Brandon Broussard and Joseph Hampton	March 4, 2009	313
124	14	"Games People Play"	Tyler Perry	Joseph Hampton	March 4, 2009	314
125	15	"Help Wanted"	Tyler Perry	Steve Coulter & Dani Renee	April 8, 2009	315
126	16	"Old Lady Paynes"	Tyler Perry	Lamont Ferrell	April 8, 2009	316
127	17	"I Don't Know This Payne"	Tyler Perry	Tricia Johnson and Myra J.	April 15, 2009	317
128	18	"Pall Mall"	Tyler Perry	Steve Coulter	April 15, 2009	318
129	19	"With Friends Like These"	Tyler Perry	Dani Renee	April 22, 2009	319
130	20	"The Talent Show"	Tyler Perry	Myra J. and Kelly Zimmerman-Green	April 22, 2009	320
131	21	"Bringing Down the House"	Tyler Perry	Joseph Hampton	April 29, 2009	321
132	22	"Moving Day"	Tyler Perry	Calvin Brown Jr.	April 29, 2009	322
133	23	"Moving Out"	Tyler Perry	Kelly Zimmerman-Green	May 27, 2009	323
134	24	"Back Where We Belong"	Tyler Perry	Myra J.	May 27, 2009	324
135	25	"Surprise!: Part 1"	Tyler Perry	Gary Sturgis	June 3, 2009	325
136	26	"Surprise!: Part 2"	Tyler Perry	Joseph Hampton & Steve Coulter	June 3, 2009	326

=== Season 4 (2009–2011) ===
No. overall	No. in season	Title	Directed by	Written by	Original release date	Prod. code
137	1	"Where's the Payne?"	Kim Fields	Steve Coulter	November 4, 2009	401
138	2	"Recurring Paynes"	Kim Fields	Robin M. Henry	November 4, 2009	402
139	3	"Wigging Out"	Kim Fields	Don Woodard	November 11, 2009	403
140	4	"Payne Speaking"	Kim Fields	Don Woodard	November 11, 2009	404
141	5	"Parental Payne"	Kim Fields	Brian Egeston	November 18, 2009	405
142	6	"Payne, Payne Go Away"	Kim Fields	Erika Kaestle and Stacey Evans Morgan	November 18, 2009	406
143	7	"Marriage Paynes"	Kim Fields	Daniel Beaty and Stacey Evans Morgan	November 25, 2009	407
144	8	"Ms. Curtis"	Kim Fields	Spencer Gilbert	December 2, 2009	408
145	9	"Oh, Christmas Payne"	Chip Hurd	Brian Egeston & Torian Hughes	December 9, 2009	409
146	10	"Til Payne Do We Part"	Chip Hurd	Adam Szymkowicz	December 23, 2009	410
147	11	"Payneful Reunion"	Chip Hurd	Torian Hughes	March 3, 2010	411
148	12	"From the Mouths of Babes"	Kim Fields	Lisa Michelle Payton	March 3, 2010	412
149	13	"Blackout X 3"	Kim Fields	Adam Szymkowicz	March 10, 2010	413
150	14	"Lady Sings the Blues"	Chip Hurd	Steve Coulter & Don Woodard	March 10, 2010	414
151	15	"Something's Brewing"	Chip Hurd	Don Woodard & Steve Coulter	March 17, 2010	415
152	16	"Seal of Approval"	Chip Hurd	Robin M. Henry & Don Woodard	March 17, 2010	416
153	17	"Payneful Pie"	Chip Hurd	Kellie Zimmerman-Green	March 24, 2010	417
154	18	"How Do You Like Your Roast?"	Chip Hurd	Robin M. Henry & Steve Coulter	March 24, 2010	418
155	19	"Curtis Sings the Blues"	Chip Hurd	Robin M. Henry & Don Woodard	March 31, 2010	419
156	20	"Firestorm"	Chip Hurd	Torian Hughes	March 31, 2010	420
157	21	"Heartbeat"	Chip Hurd	Brian Egeston	April 7, 2010	421
158	22	"Through the Fire"	Chip Hurd	Robin M. Henry	April 7, 2010	422
159	23	"The Bible: King Payne's Version"	Chip Hurd	Don Woodard	April 14, 2010	423
160	24	"Matured Investment"	Chip Hurd	Torian Hughes	April 14, 2010	424
161	25	"Who's Your Daddy Now?"	Chip Hurd	Brian Egeston	April 21, 2010	425
162	26	"Feet of Clay"	Chip Hurd	Don Woodard	April 21, 2010	426
163	27	"Date Night x 3"	Chip Hurd	Adam Szymkowicz	April 28, 2010	427
164	28	"Watch the Son Shine"	Chip Hurd	Brian Egeston & Adam Szymkowicz	April 28, 2010	428
165	29	"The Drinking Game"	Chip Hurd	Karen Felix and Don Woodard	May 5, 2010	429
166	30	"Who's On Top?"	Chip Hurd	Robin M. Henry & Torian Hughes	May 5, 2010	430
167	31	"Help, Help, Help"	Chip Hurd	Brian Egeston & Robin M. Henry	May 12, 2010	431
168	32	"Stinging Payne"	Chip Hurd	Don Woodard	May 12, 2010	432
169	33	"Worth Fighting For"	Chip Hurd	Torian Hughes	May 19, 2010	433
170	34	"Who's Your Nanny?"	Chip Hurd	Robin M. Henry & Adam Szymkowicz	May 19, 2010	434
171	35	"The Chef"	Chip Hurd	Anthony C. Hill	May 26, 2010	435
172	36	"My Fair Curtis"	Chip Hurd	Don Woodard	May 26, 2010	436
173	37	"Rest for the Weary"	Chip Hurd	Brian Egeston	June 2, 2010	437
174	38	"Thug Life"	Chip Hurd	Torian Hughes	June 2, 2010	438
175	39	"Rehabilitation"	Chip Hurd	Adam Szymkowicz	June 9, 2010	439
176	40	"A Payne In Need Is A Pain Indeed"	Chip Hurd	Don Woodard	June 9, 2010	440
177	41	"House Guest"	Chip Hurd	David A. Arnold	January 5, 2011	441
178	42	"Payne Showers"	Chip Hurd	Omega Mariaunnie Stewart and Torian Hughes	January 5, 2011	442
179	43	"Playing With Fire"	Chip Hurd	Carlos Portugal	January 12, 2011	443
180	44	"When the Payne's Away"	Chip Hurd	Kristin Topps and Don Woodard	January 12, 2011	444
181	45	"Beginnings"	Chip Hurd	Myra J.	January 19, 2011	445
182	46	"Payneful Resolution"	Chip Hurd	Anthony C. Hill	January 19, 2011	446

=== Season 5 (2011–2012) ===
No. overall	No. in season	Title	Directed by	Written by	Original release date	Prod. code
Part 1
183	1	"Payneful Resolution Resolution"	Tyler Perry	Brian Egeston, Tanya Hoffler-Moore and Angi Bones	March 30, 2011	501
184	2	"Growing Paynes"	Tyler Perry	Aeysha Carr	March 30, 2011	502
185	3	"Payne Protection"	Tyler Perry	Don Woodard	April 6, 2011	503
186	4	"Payneful Visit"	Tyler Perry	Aeysha Carr	April 6, 2011	504
187	5	"Where There's a Will, There's a Way"	Chip Hurd	Beverly D. Hunter	April 13, 2011	505
188	6	"Epic Fail"	Kim Fields	Tanya Hoffler-Moore & Kevin A. Garrett	April 13, 2011	506
189	7	"Praying for Attention"	Tyler Perry	Dani Reese	April 20, 2011	507
190	8	"Shout Out"	Kim Fields	Tanya Hoffler-Moore	April 20, 2011	508
191	9	"Love Thy Neighbor"	Chip Hurd	Beverly D. Hunter	April 27, 2011	509
192	10	"Dream Girls"	Tyler Perry	Tanya Hoffler-Moore	April 27, 2011	510
193	11	"A Payneful Night Out"	Chip Hurd	Kevin A. Garrett	May 4, 2011	511
194	12	"Payneful Assistance"	Chip Hurd	Tanya Hoffler-Moore	May 4, 2011	512
195	13	"House of Awkward"	Chip Hurd	Brian Egeston	May 11, 2011	513
196	14	"Brain Payne"	Chip Hurd	Brian Egeston	May 11, 2011	514
197	15	"Foster Paynes"	Kim Fields	Joseph Hampton	May 18, 2011	515
198	16	"Talented Paynes"	Roger M. Bobb	Tanya Hoffler-Moore	May 18, 2011	516
199	17	"Going, Going, Gone"	Kim Fields	Joseph Hampton	May 25, 2011	517
200	18	"Mother's Day Out"	Roger M. Bobb	Myra J. & Robin M. Henry	June 1, 2011	518
201	19	"So Hard To Say Goodbye"	Tyler Perry	David A. Arnold	June 8, 2011	519
202	20	"Payneful Rescue"	Tyler Perry	Brian Egeston	June 15, 2011	520
Part 2
203	21	"A Mother's Payne"	Kim Fields	Brian Egeston	October 21, 2011	521
204	22	"Up From the Ashes"	Kim Fields	Aeysha Carr	October 21, 2011	522
205	23	"The Payne Gang"	Roger M. Bobb	Kevin A. Garnett	October 28, 2011	523
206	24	"The Gifted and the Grout"	Kim Fields	Kevin A. Garnett	October 28, 2011	524
207	25	"Do the Fight Thing"	Kim Fields	Tanya Hoffler-Moore	November 4, 2011	525
208	26	"1096"	Kim Fields	Aeysha Carr	November 4, 2011	526
209	27	"Number Five's Fight"	Chip Hurd	Brian Egeston	November 11, 2011	527
210	28	"The Best Surprise"	Chip Hurd	Joseph Hampton	November 11, 2011	528
211	29	"Working Paynes"	Chip Hurd	Adrianne Carter	November 18, 2011	529
212	30	"Curtis Jefferson"	Tyler Perry	Joseph Hampton & Brian Egeston	November 18, 2011	530
213	31	"Dead Wrong"	Kim Fields	Myra J.	November 25, 2011	531
214	32	"The Rich and Payneless"	Kim Fields	Tanya Hoffler-Moore	November 25, 2011	532
215	33	"Mentoring Paynes"	Kim Fields	Joseph Hampton	December 2, 2011	533
216	34	"Roommate Paynes"	Chip Hurd	David A. Arnold	December 2, 2011	534
217	35	"Pledging Paynes"	Chip Hurd	Brian Egeston	December 30, 2011	535
218	36	"Help Me, Ella"	Chip Hurd	Anthony C. Hill	December 30, 2011	536
229	37	"Paynefully Fit"	Tyler Perry	Tanya Hoffler-Moore	January 6, 2012	537
220	38	"Do the Hustle"	Tyler Perry	Beverly D. Hunter	January 6, 2012	538
221	39	"No More Payne"	Tyler Perry	Joseph Hampton	January 13, 2012	539
222	40	"God Bless the Paynes"	Tyler Perry	Joseph Hampton & Brian Egeston	January 13, 2012	540

=== Season 6 (2012) ===
No. overall	No. in season	Title	Directed by	Written by	Original release date	Prod. code
223	1	"Do or Die"	Tyler Perry	Brian Egeston	January 20, 2012	601
224	2	"R.I.P (Rest in Payne)"	Tyler Perry	Brian Egeston	January 20, 2012	602
225	3	"Payne-ful Survival"	Tyler Perry	Anthony C. Hill	January 27, 2012	603
226	4	"Payneful Recovery"	Tyler Perry	David A. Arnold	January 27, 2012	604
227	5	"House of Nightmares"	Tyler Perry	Robin M. Henry	February 3, 2012	605
228	6	"In Payne"	Tyler Perry	Myra J.	February 3, 2012	606
229	7	"Payback"	Kim Fields	Robin M. Henry & Myra J.	February 10, 2012	607
230	8	"Daddy Day Scare"	Kim Fields	Anthony C. Hill	February 10, 2012	608
231	9	"Pills and Thrills"	Kim Fields	Robin M. Henry	February 17, 2012	609
232	10	"Scars of Payne"	Kim Fields	Brian Egeston	February 17, 2012	610
233	11	"Payne vs. Payne"	Kim Fields	David A. Arnold	February 17, 2012	611
234	12	"Guess Who Came to Breakfast"	Kim Fields	David A. Arnold	February 17, 2012	612
235	13	"House of Forced Closure"	Kim Fields	Myra J.	March 2, 2012	613
236	14	"If it Ain't Broke"	Kim Fields	Kevin Garrett	March 2, 2012	614
237	15	"Neighborhood Crisis"	Kim Fields	Joseph Hampton	March 9, 2012	615
238	16	"Down for the Count"	Chip Hurd	Joseph Hampton	March 9, 2012	616
239	17	"Stop, Drop and Roll"	Kim Fields	Tanya Hoffler-Moore	May 11, 2012	617
240	18	"No Pass, No Play"	Chip Hurd	Anthony C. Hill	May 11, 2012	618
241	19	"Payneful Injection"	Chip Hurd	Brian Egeston	May 18, 2012	619
242	20	"Batter Up"	Kim Fields	Myra J.	May 18, 2012	620
243	21	"Payneful Matrimony"	Chip Hurd	David A. Arnold	May 25, 2012	621
244	22	"What You Know About Me"	Chip Hurd	Anthony C. Hill	May 25, 2012	622
245	23	"Right Turn"	Chip Hurd	Myra J.	June 1, 2012	623
246	24	"The Loan Ranger"	Chip Hurd	Brian Egeston	June 1, 2012	624
247	25	"Payneful Divorce"	Chip Hurd	David A. Arnold	June 8, 2012	625
248	26	"Up to the Challenge"	Kim Fields	Joseph Hampton	June 8, 2012	626
249	27	"House of Sabotage"	Kim Fields	Chrystal Ellzy	June 15, 2012	627
250	28	"Payneful Pop In"	Kim Fields	David A. Arnold	June 15, 2012	628
251	29	"House of OMG"	Kim Fields	Brian Egeston	June 22, 2012	629
252	30	"Keep It Moving"	Kim Fields	Robin M. Henry & Myra J.	June 22, 2012	630
253	31	"Bake, Rattle and Roll"	Kim Fields	Brian Egeston	June 29, 2012	631
254	32	"Dodging Bullies"	Chip Hurd	David A. Arnold	June 29, 2012	632
255	33	"Payneful Distance"	Chip Hurd	Joseph Hampton	July 6, 2012	633
256	34	"Not in the Cards"	Chip Hurd	Robin M. Henry & Myra J.	July 6, 2012	634
257	35	"All Work and No Play"	Chip Hurd	Tony Rhone	July 20, 2012	635
258	36	"Amazing Matriarchs"	Chip Hurd	Brian Egeston	July 20, 2012	636
259	37	"The First Dance"	Tyler Perry	Story by : David A. Arnold; Teleplay by : David A. Arnold & Tyler Perry	July 27, 2012	637
260	38	"The Invention of Trust"	Chip Hurd	Anthony C. Hill	July 27, 2012	638
261	39	"Payneful Realization"	Tyler Perry	Anthony C. Hill	August 3, 2012	639
262	40	"Trial and Tribulation"	Chip Hurd	Joseph Hampton	August 3, 2012	640
263	41	"The Call Back"	Chip Hurd	Story by : David A. Arnold; Teleplay by : Joseph Hampton & Anthony C. Hill	August 10, 2012	641
264	42	"All's Well"	Chip Hurd	Myra J.	August 10, 2012	642

=== Season 7 (2020–2021) ===
No. overall	No. in season	Title	Directed by	Written by	Original release date	Prod. code	U.S. viewers (millions)
265	1	"A Wise Man's Opinion"	Tyler Perry	Tyler Perry	September 2, 2020	701	0.92
266	2	"Delicious"	Tyler Perry	Tyler Perry	September 2, 2020	702	1.09
267	3	"By Your Side"	Tyler Perry	Tyler Perry	September 9, 2020	703	0.84
268	4	"The Old People Game"	Tyler Perry	Tyler Perry	September 9, 2020	704	0.94
269	5	"Women of Today"	Tyler Perry	Tyler Perry	September 16, 2020	705	0.77
270	6	"Mixed Emotions"	Tyler Perry	Tyler Perry	September 16, 2020	706	0.90
271	7	"Love and Hate"	Tyler Perry	Tyler Perry	September 23, 2020	707	0.71
272	8	"From Heart to Heart"	Tyler Perry	Tyler Perry	September 23, 2020	708	0.90
273	9	"Someone"	Tyler Perry	Tyler Perry	September 30, 2020	709	0.75
274	10	"Something's Rotten"	Tyler Perry	Tyler Perry	September 30, 2020	710	0.92
275	11	"Hard Lessons"	Tyler Perry	Tyler Perry	October 7, 2020	711	0.76
276	12	"Lucky Cards"	Tyler Perry	Tyler Perry	October 14, 2020	712	0.86
277	13	"Moving On"	Tyler Perry	Tyler Perry	October 21, 2020	713	0.93
278	14	"Been A Long Time"	Tyler Perry	Tyler Perry	October 28, 2020	714	0.80
279	15	"J. Boogie"	Tyler Perry	Tyler Perry	November 4, 2020	715	0.89
280	16	"The Dinosaur and the Rabbit"	Tyler Perry	Tyler Perry	November 11, 2020	716	0.77
281	17	"Dark Thirty"	Tyler Perry	Tyler Perry	November 18, 2020	717	0.73
282	18	"Out of Character"	Tyler Perry	Tyler Perry	November 25, 2020	718	0.80
283	19	"The Package"	Tyler Perry	Tyler Perry	December 2, 2020	719	0.87
284	20	"If You Loved Me"	Tyler Perry	Tyler Perry	December 9, 2020	720	0.92
285	21	"The Big Game"	Tyler Perry	Tyler Perry	December 16, 2020	721	0.94
286	22	"Give and Take"	Tyler Perry	Tyler Perry	December 23, 2020	722	1.00
287	23	"Parenting 101"	Tyler Perry	Tyler Perry	December 30, 2020	723	0.80
288	24	"Ya' Hearrrd Me"	Mark E. Swinton	Tyler Perry	January 6, 2021	724	0.66
289	25	"Woman of the Night"	Mark E. Swinton	Mark E. Swinton	January 13, 2021	725	0.63

=== Season 8 (2021–2022) ===
No. overall	No. in season	Title	Directed by	Written by	Original release date	Prod. code	U.S. viewers (millions)
Part 1
290	1	"Whiplash"	Mark E. Swinton	Brian Egeston	May 25, 2021	801	0.56
291	2	"A Payneful Lesson"	Mark E. Swinton	Deance Wyatt	June 1, 2021	802	0.59
292	3	"All Lumped Together"	Derrick Doose	Chrystal Ellzy	June 8, 2021	803	0.62
293	4	"Back That Thang Up"	Mark E. Swinton	Myra J.	June 15, 2021	804	0.62
294	5	"Sauce Bosses"	Mark E. Swinton	Brian Egeston	June 22, 2021	805	0.55
295	6	"Missing Mustard Seeds"	Derrick Doose	Brian Egeston	June 29, 2021	806	0.52
296	7	"In The Hot Seat"	Derrick Doose	Chrystal Ellzy	July 6, 2021	807	0.51
297	8	"Karen"	Derrick Doose	Sabrina Campbell	July 13, 2021	808	0.57
Part 2
298	9	"Me Against the World"	Derrick Doose	Chrystal Ellzy	October 12, 2021	809	0.62
299	10	"Pow Wow at the Paynes"	Derrick Doose	Myra J.	October 19, 2021	810	0.50
300	11	"Bearer of Bad News"	Derrick Doose	Brian Egeston	October 26, 2021	811	0.52
301	12	"Fake Newsletters"	Mark E. Swinton	Myra J.	November 2, 2021	812	0.46
302	13	"Home Invaders"	Derrick Doose	Tyler Perry	November 9, 2021	813	0.49
303	14	"DNAin't"	Derrick Doose	Brian Egeston	November 16, 2021	814	0.50
304	15	"Stop Shop And Roll"	Derrick Doose	Myra J.	November 23, 2021	815	0.53
305	16	"Paynefully Honest"	Derrick Doose	Chrystal Ellzy	November 30, 2021	816	0.71
306	17	"Wondering Prince"	Derrick Doose	Brian Egeston	December 7, 2021	817	0.49
307	18	"A Little Discipline"	Mark E. Swinton	April Powell	December 14, 2021	818	0.55
308	19	"A Payneful Compromise"	Derrick Doose	Leno L. Bradby Jr.	December 21, 2021	819	0.55
309	20	"Fine Wine"	Mark E. Swinton	Lance Gross	January 4, 2022	820	0.48
310	21	"The First Day"	Derrick Doose	Myra J.	January 11, 2022	821	0.52
311	22	"Payneful Suffering"	Mark E. Swinton	Brian Egeston	January 18, 2022	822	0.64

=== Season 9 (2022) ===
No. overall	No. in season	Title	Directed by	Written by	Original release date	Prod. code	U.S. viewers (millions)
Part 1
312	1	"What's In A Payne Name"	Kim Fields	Brian Egeston	March 23, 2022	901	0.74
313	2	"Major Payne"	Kim Fields	Arthur Harris	March 30, 2022	902	0.53
314	3	"Bag Men"	Kim Fields	Brain Egeston	April 6, 2022	903	0.60
315	4	"H.O. Hate"	Mark E. Swinton	Brain Egeston	April 13, 2022	904	0.54
316	5	"Meme, Myself, and I"	Kim Fields	Arthur Harris	April 20, 2022	905	0.44
317	6	"Good Will Nothing"	Kim Fields	Arthur Harris	April 27, 2022	906	0.47
318	7	"Payne-Ting"	Kim Fields	Angela Yarbrough	May 4, 2022	907	0.53
319	8	"A Payne-ful Interview"	Kim Fields	Angela Yarbrough	May 11, 2022	908	0.36
320	9	"Woman To Woman"	Kim Fields	Arthur Harris	May 18, 2022	909	0.55
321	10	"It Was All A Dream"	Mark E. Swinton	Lance Gross	May 25, 2022	910	0.38
Part 2
322	11	"Payneful Pain"	Mark E. Swinton	Anomi Ortiz	October 12, 2022	911	0.63
323	12	"Going to the Chapel And Not Getting Married"	Mark E. Swinton	Arthur Harris	October 19, 2022	912	0.59
324	13	"Unwelcomed Neighbors"	Mark E. Swinton	April Powell	October 26, 2022	913	0.57
325	14	"Cracked Nest Egg"	Keshia Knight Pulliam	Arthur Harris	November 2, 2022	914	0.58
326	15	"The Paranoid And The Private"	Mark E. Swinton	Chrystal Ellzy	November 9, 2022	915	0.64
327	16	"Of Mice and Men"	Derrick Doose	Angela Yarbrough	November 16, 2022	916	0.53
328	17	"Insecurity System"	Derrick Doose	Arthur Harris	November 23, 2022	917	0.55
329	18	"Hashtag Help"	Derrick Doose	Brain Egeston	November 30, 2022	918	0.56
330	19	"Mr. Bills"	Carl Anthony Payne II	Arthur Harris	December 7, 2022	919	0.54
331	20	"Coco Parenting"	Mark E. Swinton	Brain Egeston	December 14, 2022	920	0.65
332	21	"So Nice to Meat You"	Mark E. Swinton	Arthur Harris	December 21, 2022	921	0.57
333	22	"Payneful Patriarch"	Mark E. Swinton	Brain Egeston	December 28, 2022	922	0.64

=== Season 10 (2023) ===
No. overall	No. in season	Title	Directed by	Written by	Original release date	Prod. code	U.S. viewers (millions)
Part 1
334	1	"Like New Money"	Mark E. Swinton	Mark E. Swinton	March 22, 2023	1001	0.59
335	2	"Just Payne Trippin"	Mark E. Swinton	Leno L. Bradby Jr.	March 29, 2023	1002	0.59
336	3	"Les Boss Sauce"	Derrick Doose	Tony Rhone III	April 5, 2023	1003	0.53
337	4	"One Legged Funeral Director"	Derrick Doose	Brain Egeston	April 12, 2023	1004	0.52
338	5	"Forget Me Not"	Derrick Doose	Arthur Harris	April 19, 2023	1005	0.50
339	6	"Encouragement"	Mark E. Swinton	Tony Rhone III	April 26, 2023	1006	0.53
340	7	"Balancing Payne"	Mark E. Swinton	Chrystal Ellzy	May 3, 2023	1007	0.49
341	8	"Paynes in the Butt"	Derrick Doose	Arthur Harris	May 10, 2023	1008	0.47
342	9	"Deena"	Mark E. Swinton	Tony Rhone III	May 17, 2023	1009	0.43
343	10	"The New Praisers"	Mark E. Swinton	Tony Rhone III	May 24, 2023	1010	0.61
Part 2
344	11	"Model Behavior"	Mark E. Swinton	Arthur Harris	August 16, 2023	1011	0.61
345	12	"I Am Handy Woman, Hear Me Roar"	Derrick Doose	Arthur Harris	August 16, 2023	1012	0.63
346	13	"Make It Rain"	Derrick Doose	Tony Rhone III	August 16, 2023	1013	0.65
347	14	"Say My Name"	Mark E. Swinton	Arthur Harris	August 23, 2023	1014	0.49
348	15	"Out In the Open"	Derrick Doose	April Powell	August 23, 2023	1015	0.53
349	16	"Zaddy"	Derrick Doose	Tony Rhone III	August 23, 2023	1016	0.51
350	17	"El Capitan"	Keshia Knight Pulliam	April Powell	August 30, 2023	1017	0.48
351	18	"To Jump Or Not To Jump"	Keshia Knight Pulliam	Chrystal Ellzy	August 30, 2023	1018	0.50
352	19	"They Call Me Chef Payne"	Derrick Doose	Chrystal Ellzy	August 30, 2023	1019	0.52
353	20	"Run Them Pockets"	Derrick Doose	Brain Egeston	September 6, 2023	1020	0.54
354	21	"Double Trouble"	Mark E. Swinton	Chrystal Ellzy	September 6, 2023	1021	0.60
355	22	"True Measures"	Mark E. Swinton	Mark E. Swinton	September 6, 2023	1022	0.56

=== Season 11 (2024–2025) ===
No. overall	No. in season	Title	Directed by	Written by	Original release date	Prod. code	U.S. viewers (millions)
Part 1
356	1	"Piece By Piece"	Mark E. Swinton	Branyon Davis	August 13, 2024	1101	N/A
357	2	"Adjust Your Crown, Sis"	Keshia Knight Pulliam	Chrystal Ellzy	August 20, 2024	1102	N/A
358	3	"No Bueno"	Derrick Doose	Tony Rhone III	August 27, 2024	1103	N/A
359	4	"Failure to Succeed"	Derrick Doose	Chrystal Ellzy	September 3, 2024	1104	N/A
360	5	"Love Yourz"	Mark E. Swinton	Mavro Diamanti	September 10, 2024	1105	N/A
361	6	"The Chicken or the Egg"	Derrick Doose	Tony Rhone III	September 17, 2024	1106	N/A
362	7	"I Wanna Dance With Somebody"	Justin Bones	Branyon Davis	September 24, 2024	1107	N/A
363	8	"Father's Day"	Derrick Doose	Tony Rhone III	October 1, 2024	1108	N/A
364	9	"Hut-Hut Psyche"	Derrick Doose	Branyon Davis	October 8, 2024	1109	N/A
365	10	"Final Answer"	Mark E. Swinton	Chrystal Ellzy	October 22, 2024	1110	N/A
366	11	"All Hands on Deck"	Mark E. Swinton	Tony Rhone III	November 19, 2024	1111	N/A
367	12	"Breakup To Makeup"	Mark E. Swinton	Branyon Davis	November 26, 2024	1112	N/A
368	13	"If It Ain't Broke"	Mark E. Swinton	Chrystal Ellzy	December 3, 2024	1113	N/A
369	14	"House of Funk"	Derrick Doose	Chrystal Ellzy	December 10, 2024	1114	N/A
370	15	"Barracuda Pool"	Derrick Doose	Branyon Davis	December 17, 2024	1115	N/A
371	16	"Paynefully Moving On"	Mark E. Swinton	Tony Rhone III	December 17, 2024	1116	N/A
Part 2
372	17	"Tricks No Treats"	Keshia Knight Pulliam	Tre'Mond "TK" Kearse	March 25, 2025	1117	N/A
373	18	"Love at First Swipe"	Mark E. Swinton	Deance Wyatt	April 1, 2025	1118	N/A
374	19	"House of Cards"	Mark E. Swinton	Mark E. Swinton	April 8, 2025	1119	N/A
375	20	"The Incomparable Ella"	Keshia Knight Pulliam	Chrystal Ellzy	April 9, 2025	1120	N/A
376	21	"Houston, We've Got a Problem"	Derrick Doose	Tony Rhone III	April 15, 2025	1121	N/A
377	22	"House of Love"	Mark E. Swinton	Mark E. Swinton	April 16, 2025	1122	N/A

=== Season 12 (2025–2026) ===
No. overall	No. in season	Title	Directed by	Written by	Original release date	Prod. code	U.S. viewers (millions)
Part 1
378	1	"House of Realization"	Mark E. Swinton	Mark E. Swinton	April 30, 2025	1201	N/A
379	2	"Doing the Work"	Mark E. Swinton	Mark E. Swinton	May 7, 2025	1202	N/A
380	3	"House of Outrage"	Mark E. Swinton	Mark E. Swinton	May 14, 2025	1203	N/A
381	4	"The Talk"	Keshia Knight Pulliam	Mark E. Swinton	May 21, 2025	1204	N/A
382	5	"House of Tough Decisions"	Mark E. Swinton	Mark E. Swinton	May 28, 2025	1205	N/A
383	6	"House of Bad Neighbors"	Keshia Knight Pulliam	Mark E. Swinton	June 4, 2025	1206	N/A
384	7	"Burying the Hatchet"	Mark E. Swinton	Mark E. Swinton	June 11, 2025	1207	N/A
385	8	"House of Probation"	Mark E. Swinton	Mark E. Swinton	June 18, 2025	1208	N/A
386	9	"House of Second Chances"	Mark E. Swinton	Mark E. Swinton	June 25, 2025	1209	N/A
387	10	"Protector in Chief"	Keshia Knight Pulliam	Mark E. Swinton	July 2, 2025	1210	N/A
Part 2
388	11	"The Storm"	Mark E. Swinton	Mark E. Swinton	November 5, 2025	1211	N/A
389	12	"House of Change"	Mark E. Swinton	Mark E. Swinton	November 12, 2025	1212	N/A
390	13	"House of Final Chapters"	Mark E. Swinton	Mark E. Swinton	November 19, 2025	1213	N/A
391	14	"A Brother's Love"	Mark E. Swinton	Mark E. Swinton	November 26, 2025	1214	N/A
392	15	"Can We Have Dinner"	Mark E. Swinton	Mark E. Swinton	December 3, 2025	1215	N/A
393	16	"Hanging Solo"	Mark E. Swinton	Mark E. Swinton	December 10, 2025	1216	N/A
394	17	"A Chicken Dinner"	Mark E. Swinton	Mark E. Swinton	December 17, 2025	1217	N/A
Part 3
395	18	"Good As Gold"	Mark E. Swinton	Mark E. Swinton	February 4, 2026	1218	N/A
396	19	"A Payne Family Portrait"	Keshia Knight Pulliam	Mark E. Swinton	February 11, 2026	1219	N/A
397	20	"Life Is Long"	Keshia Knight Pulliam	Mark E. Swinton	February 18, 2026	1220	N/A
398	21	"Don't Grow Weary"	Mark E. Swinton	Mark E. Swinton	February 25, 2026	1221	N/A
399	22	"The Stages of Love"	Mark E. Swinton	Mark E. Swinton	March 4, 2026	1222	N/A
400	23	"The Package"	Tyler Perry	Tyler Perry	March 11, 2026	1223	N/A
