= Guess Who's Coming for Dinner =

Guess Who's Coming for Dinner may refer to:

== Literature ==
- Guess Who's Coming for Dinner, a book by John Kelly and Cathy Tincknell
- Guess Who's Coming for Dinner, a novel of Shivers (novel series), by M.D. Spenser

== See also ==
- Guess Who's Coming to Dinner (disambiguation)
- Guess Who's Coming to Santa's for Dinner?, a children's book by Tomie dePaola
- "Guess Who's Coming for the Dinner", a short story of the collection The Deportees and Other Stories
- "Guess Who's Coming to Johnny's for Dinner", an episode of the television animated series Johnny Test
