= The Last Fall =

- Directed by: Matthew A. Cherry
- Written by: Matthew A. Cherry
- Produced by: Scott Hebert; Nikki Love; Monica A. Young
- Starring: Lance Gross; Nicole Beharie
- Cinematography: Richard J. Vialet
- Edited by: Matthew A. Cherry; Michael Norville
- Music by: Tremaine Williams
- Production company: Transparent Filmworks
- Distributed by: Image Entertainment
- Release dates: March 9, 2012 (South by Southwest); October 26, 2012 (limited)
- Running time: 98 minutes
- Country: United States
- Language: English

The Last Fall is a 2012 American drama film written and directed by Matthew A. Cherry and starring Lance Gross and Nicole Beharie. It is Cherry's directorial debut.

== Cast ==
- Lance Gross as Kyle Bishop
- Nicole Beharie as Faith Davis
- Vanessa Bell Calloway as Marie Bishop
- Harry Lennix as Ron Davis
- Keith David as Sydney Bishop
- Darrin Henson as Rell Lee
- Sayeed Shahidi as Von Davis
- Rayan Lawrence as The Turk
