= Our Family Wedding =

- Theatrical release poster
- Directed by: Rick Famuyiwa
- Screenplay by: Wayne Conley; Malcolm Spellman; Rick Famuyiwa
- Story by: Wayne Conley
- Produced by: Edward Saxon
- Starring: Forest Whitaker; America Ferrera; Carlos Mencia; Regina King; Lance Gross
- Cinematography: Julio Macat
- Edited by: Dirk Westervelt
- Music by: Transcenders
- Production company: Dune Entertainment
- Distributed by: Fox Searchlight Pictures
- Release date: March 12, 2010
- Running time: 90 minutes
- Country: United States
- Language: English
- Box office: $21.4 million

Our Family Wedding is a 2010 American romantic comedy film directed by Rick Famuyiwa. It stars Forest Whitaker, America Ferrera, Carlos Mencia, Diana-Maria Riva, Lance Gross, Charlie Murphy and Regina King. The story is about an African-American man and a Mexican-American woman getting married and their respective fathers causing hijinks with one another towards their special day. The film was theatrically released in North America by Fox Searchlight Pictures on March 12, 2010, receiving negative reviews from critics but grossed $21.4 million worldwide.

== Plot ==
Marcus Boyd, a young African-American, has recently graduated from Columbia Medical School and is going to Laos for a year to work with Doctors Without Borders. Lucia Ramirez, who is Mexican-American, volunteers at a charter school for recent immigrants as an English teacher, having dropped out of Columbia Law School to pursue her passion, although she has neglected to tell her parents. Unbeknownst to their respective families, they have been living together for several months and are planning to wed before going to Laos together.

Meanwhile, in Los Angeles, Marcus' father Brad, a successful radio host, is returning from a typical one-night-stand with a younger woman when he sees his car being towed by Miguel, who happens to be Lucia's father and runs a successful auto shop and towing business. Brad tries unsuccessfully to halt the tow by holding on to the door of his car. Both Miguel and Brad hurl various racial insults at one another. That night, Marcus and Lucia invite their families to a joint dinner, where Miguel is surprised to learn of Marcus's existence, and Brad brings a much younger date who is in fact an old high school friend of Lucia's. As a shock to both families, the couple reveal their engagement and travel plans, with Brad and Miguel incredulous that they will soon be in-laws. As the wedding planning begins, both families attempt to dominate it with their respective traditions, while Brad's long-time friend Angie helps to mediate things, stressing the phrase "Our marriage, their wedding" to Marcus and Lucia to help them understand how much they must compromise to keep peace between their loved ones.

The wedding is set to take place at Brad's estate, much to his chagrin, and Brad tries to dissuade Marcus from rushing into a marriage as he feels he did with Marcus's mother. Meanwhile, Miguel feels that Marcus is not good enough for Lucia because she did not feel comfortable enough to mention him before the engagement. While wedding dress shopping, Lucia's sister Isabel, who helps run the auto shop with Miguel, argues with Lucia about marrying young like the other women in their family, something they vowed not to do as teenagers. Their mother Sonia overhears their conversation, which quickly shifts to mocking her life as a homemaker who is clearly living vicariously through the wedding, which upsets her.

While trying to hire a DJ for the reception, Miguel and Brad become drunk at a club and are arrested after an altercation. When Marcus and Lucia go to pick them up from the station, an argument erupts in which Miguel feels that Marcus is freeloading off of Lucia since he will be working as a doctor without pay and still believes that she is becoming a lawyer. When Lucia does not come to his defense, Marcus feels abandoned, leading to another argument between them. When Lucia questions if Marcus still wants to get married, he replies "I don't know", which leads her to call off the nuptials. Angered when Sonia refers to the wedding as "our wedding" and Miguel offers to "toss the ball" at the news, Lucia finally admits all the secrets she has been keeping from her parents, leaving them shocked.

Brad and Angie have begun seeing each other after a lifetime of friendship, which ends quickly once Angie sees another one-night-stand in Brad's home. Marcus and Brad have a sincere conversation while attempting to cope with their mutual loss and help each other realize how much they truly love their significant others. Miguel assures Lucia that he will always love and be proud of her as long as she is honest with him, and only wants her to be happy. He also gifts a classic lowrider he was renovating for Lucia as a graduation/wedding gift to Sonia to apologize for how he has let their marriage stagnate, assuring her he will always find her attractive and want to have fun with her. Isabel helps Lucia realize that she still loves Marcus, and pushes her to reunite with him. Lucia goes to Brad's home and tries to serenade Marcus, saying she is happy to marry Marcus in a way that is only for them, while Marcus apologizes for making her feel she must choose between him and her family.

The day of the wedding arrives, and events quickly turn chaotic as the extended families begin to clash, while Miguel and Brad finally seem to be working together for their children's happiness. Just before the ceremony begins, Marcus asks Miguel for Lucia's hand in marriage as a gesture of good will, which Miguel grants as a sign of respect and acceptance. The ceremony honors traditions from both families, and the reception becomes a joyous occasion. Brad makes an attempt to atone with Angie, apologizing for threatening their relationship and not pursuing her long ago, and promising to commit to her. Marcus and Lucia share a dance, happy that they are married and that their families have found a way to be together.

During the end credits, several pictures of the two families are shown depicting family events, including Isabel's engagement to Harry, who is Asian-American, while Miguel is seen weeping at the troubles ahead.

== Cast ==
- Forest Whitaker as Bradford "Brad" Boyd
- America Ferrera as Lucia Ramirez
- Lance Gross as Marcus Boyd
- Carlos Mencia as Miguel Ramirez
- Regina King as Angela
- Diana Maria Riva as Sonia Ramirez
- Anjelah Johnson as Isabel Ramirez
- Shannyn Sossamon as Ashley McPhee
- Charlie Murphy as T.J.
- Lupe Ontiveros as grandma Cecilia
- Harry Shum Jr. as Harry (as Harry Shum)
- Hayley Marie Norman as Sienna
- Fred Armisen as Philip Gusto (Deleted Scenes Only)
- Skylan Brooks as Buddy Boyd
- Noel G. as Raymond Mata

== Release ==
=== Box office ===
Our Family Wedding was released in theaters on March 12, 2010. At the end of its theatrical run, it made $20,712,308 in North America.

=== Critical reception ===
The film received generally negative reviews from critics. On the review aggregator website Rotten Tomatoes, 15% of 88 critics' reviews are positive, with an average rating of 3.7/10. The website's consensus reads: "Our Family Wedding is a mirthless, contrived affair that does little with its promising premise and talented cast." Metacritic, which uses a weighted average, assigned the film a score of 38 out of 100, based on 24 critics, indicating "generally unfavorable" reviews.

Roger Ebert gave praise to the performances of Ferrera, Gross and King but was critical of the family problems and the fathers feud coming across as "completely unconvincing" and "painfully forced" towards the end of the film, concluding that: Our Family Wedding is a pleasant but inconsequential comedy, awkward for the actors, and contrived from beginning to end." Andrew Dowler of NOW commended the cast for being "competent and fully energized" throughout the film, highlighting Whitaker and Mencia for emitting "gleeful animosity" while transitioning into more sincere moments, but concluded that: "The story is completely predictable, and director Rick Famuyiwa keeps things moving briskly, but he never builds his gags to laugh-out-loud levels." Lisa Schwarzbaum of Entertainment Weekly gave it an overall "C−" grade, criticizing the film's "broad, bawdy comedy" for allowing its cast to deliver "empty-calorie jokes" and "vigorous buffoonery" throughout its runtime. The A.V. Club's Nathan Rabin gave the movie a "D−" grade, heavily criticizing Famuyiwa for overusing "the comic possibilities of Viagra" throughout the film and the constant desperate ways the fathers have to fight each other until they make peace for the sake of being "narratively convenient", concluding that: "We remain a nation divided, but hopefully we've at least progressed beyond the need for clumsy message movies about racial tolerance, as fortified with dick jokes."

== See also ==
- List of black films of the 2010s
