= Guess Who's Coming to Lunch =

Guess Who's Coming to Lunch may refer to:

- "Guess Who's Coming to Lunch", an episode of the Canadian animated television series Almost Naked Animals
- "Guess Who's Coming to Lunch", an episode of the British television sitcom A Class by Himself
- "Guess Who's Coming to Lunch" (My Hero), a 2000 television episode

Guess Who's Coming to Luncheon may refer to:

- "Guess Who's Coming to Luncheon", an episode of the television reality series The Girls Next Door
- "Guess Who's Coming to Luncheon", an episode of the television sitcom Murphy Brown

== See also ==
- Guess Who's Coming to Dinner (disambiguation)
- Guess Who's Coming to Breakfast (disambiguation)
- "Guess Who's Not Coming to Lunch?", an episode of the television sitcom Grace Under Fire
