= Chip Fields =

American singer, actress, director, and producer (born 1951)

- Born: Laverne Bernard; August 5, 1951 (age 74); New York City
- Other names: Chip Fields-Hurd, Chip Hurd
- Occupations: Actress; singer; television director; dialogue coach
- Years active: 1974–present
- Known for: Lynnella Gordon – Good Times; Laverne Hunter – Living Single; Rita Conway – The Amazing Spider-Man (TV series)
- Children: 2, including Kim Fields

Laverne Bernard (born August 5, 1951), better known by her stage name Chip Fields or Chip Hurd, is an American actress, singer, television director, dialogue coach, and producer who has appeared in popular films, television series, and Broadway theatre. She is best known for portraying Lynnella Gordon, the abusive birth mother of Penny Gordon Woods (played by Janet Jackson), in a four–episode story arc (1977) of the 1970s sitcom Good Times.

== Early life ==
Laverne Bernard was born on August 5, 1951 in Harlem, New York, to Patsy Styles. Along with her elder sister Patricia Bernard, she was raised by uncle Louis Bernard. She attended the New York High School of Performing Arts. During her senior year of high school, she became pregnant by her high school boyfriend Anthony Fields and later transferred to Newark Prep to graduate with her diploma. In 1969, she married Anthony Fields and gave birth to her first daughter Kim Fields.

== Career ==
In May 1972, Fields made her acting debut as Carlotta in the Broadway comedy Tough to Get Help. The show opened and closed with only one performance at the Royale Theatre on May 4, 1972. In 1973, she was recruited by Ronnie Spector to reform The Ronettes. The group released two singles "Go Out and Get It" (1973) and "I Wish I Never Saw the Sunshine" (1974) on Buddah Records. Spector later disbanded The Ronettes and Field resumed with her solo career. She landed a role as an extra in the 1974 American romantic comedy-drama film Claudine. In the same year, she appeared in the television film Change at 125th Street. In November 1975, she returned to Broadway and starred in revival of the musical Hello, Dolly!.

In 1976, she appeared on the American television sitcom Good Times, originally as a character named Rochelle who appeared one of J.J.'s girlfriends in season four two-part episode "J.J.'s New Career". The following year, Fields returned to the show to portray a different character named Lynnetta Gordon, the abusive mother of a child name Millicent "Penny" Gordon. During the auditioning process, Fields had her biological daughter Kim Fields audition for the role of Penny Gordon, but lost the role to child star Janet Jackson. Fields went on to appear as Lynnetta Gordon in four episodes of Good Times. In 1978, Fields was cast as a series regular in the live-action television series The Amazing Spider-Man. Portraying the role of Rita Conway, a secretary for Daily Bugle and friend of Peter Parker / Spider-Man, the show was a ratings success. The series ended up being the 19th-highest-rated show of the entire season, but CBS was reluctant to commit to giving the show a regular/fixed time slot for the 1978-79 season, as the series was expensive to produce and continued to underperform with older audiences. The second season consisted of seven episodes which aired infrequently throughout the 1978–79 TV season. The series continued to do well in the ratings during its second season, however CBS cancelled the series soon after the second season ended.

In the early 1980s, Fields began making frequent guest appearances on several television films and sitcoms including The Night the City Screamed, Hill Street Blues, The Facts of Life Goes to Paris, and T. J. Hooker. In 1983, she opened her own performance academy called The Rainbow Connection, which specializes in drama and dance. In 1984, she appeared in the sitcom The Facts of Life, portraying the role of Diane Ramsey; mother of Tootie Ramsey (portrayed by her biological daughter Kim Fields). In an interview with Jet magazine, Fields stated "Knowing everybody over there at NBC made them scrutinize me harder and not take me seriously. It flattered me for people to think of me as too young to be Kim's mother but that got in the way during the audition." She returned to Broadway for the third time, securing the roles of Sylvia and Barbara Ann in the gospel musical Don't Get God Started.

In 1994, she appeared in several episodes of American sitcom Living Single, again portraying the mother Laverne Hunter to her real-life daughter Kim Fields' character Regine Hunter. In the same year, she made her debut as television director, directing the season-two episode "Groom and Doom" of sitcom Hangin' with Mr. Cooper. She began working as a dialogue coach, acting consultant, and television director for several sitcoms including The Parkers, Girlfriends, One on One, All of Us, , The Parkers, as well as episodes of Romeo!, Just Jordan, Hannah Montana, Tyler Perry's House of Payne, and Meet the Browns.

== Personal life ==
She divorced her first husband Anthony Fields in 1974. In 1982, she gave birth to her second daughter Alexis Fields. In August 1994, she remarried to a technical director named Ervin Hurd.

== Discography ==
Singles

- 1973 (as Ronnie and the Ronettes) – "Go Out and Get It" b/w "Lover, Lover" (Buddha 384)
- 1974 (as Ronnie Spector and the Ronettes) – "I Wish I Never Saw the Sunshine" b/w "I Wonder What He's Doing" (Buddha 408)

== Filmography ==
=== Acting ===
==== Film ====
Year	Title	Role	Notes	Ref.
1974	Claudine	Rioter on Hallway Stairs	Comedy-drama/romantic film directed by John Berry.; Uncredited	
1975	The Happy Hooker	Red Hat	Biographical-comedy film directed by Nicholas Sgarro	
1978	Blue Collar	Caroline Brown	Crime drama film directed by Paul Schrader	
1979	The Lady in Red	Satin	Action-drama/romantic film directed by Lewis Teague	
2004	Woman Thou Art Loosed	Woman in Church	Drama film directed by Michael Schultz	

==== Television ====
Year	Title	Role	Notes	Ref.
1974	Change at 125th Street	Harriet Morse	Made-for-TV movie directed by Bob LaHendro and Michael Schultz	
1975	Police Story	Girl in Bar	Episode: "Face for a Shadow" (S 3:Ep 6)	
1976	Good Times	Rochelle	Episode: "J.J.'s New Career, part 2" (S 4:Ep 8)	
1977	Rhoda	Nurse Franklin	Episode: "A Night in the Emergency Room" (S 3:Ep 16)	
1977	Days of Our Lives	Toni Johnson	Episode: "Episode #1.2962" (S 12:Ep 962)	
1977	What's Happening!!	Norma	Episode: "From Here to Maternity" (S 1:Ep 21)	
1977	Good Times	Lynnella Gordon	Season 5, episodes 1–3 "The Evans Get Involved"	
1977	What's Happening!!	Donna	Episode: "Give Me Odds" (S 2:Ep 8)	
1977	Freeman	Osa Lee	Made-for-TV movie directed by Lloyd Richards.	
1978	Barnaby Jones	Kelly Johnson	Episode: "A Ransom in Diamonds" (S 6:Ep 16)	
1978	Battered	Ginny Sinclair	Made-for-TV-Movie directed by Peter Werner.	
1978–79	The Amazing Spider-Man	Rita Conway	Recurring role	
1979	What's Happening!!	Donna	Episode: "Food Poisoning" (S 3:Ep 16)	
1979	Good Times	Linella Gordon	Episode: "A Matter of Mothers" (S 6:Ep 21)	
1980	The Night the City Screamed	Yvonne Clements	Made-for-TV-Movie directed by Harry Falk.	
1982	Hill Street Blues	Mrs. Halloran	Episode: "The Shooter" (S 2:Ep 17)	
1982	The Facts of Life Goes to Paris	Louise	Made-for-TV movie directed by Asaad Kelada.	
1984	T. J. Hooker	Carolyn Webster	Episode: "Anatomy of a Killing" (S 4:Ep 5)	
1984	The Facts of Life	Diane Ramsey	Episode: "Mother and Daughter" (S 5:Ep 21)	
1986	The Facts of Life	Diane Ramsey	Episode: "The Graduate" (S 7:Ep 23)	
1992	Roc	Ms. Wilson	Episode: " No Notes Is Good Notes" (S 1:Ep 16)	
1993	Where I Live	Bonita	Episode: "The Terminator" (S 1:Ep 13)	
1993	Living Single	Bar Patron	Episode: "Living Kringle" (S 1:Ep 15)	
1994	Living Single	Bev	Episode: "The Hand That Robs the Cradle" (S 1:Ep 17)	
1994	Living Single	Laverne Hunter	Episode: "She Ain't Heavy, She My Mother" (S 1:Ep 26)	
1995	Living Single	Laverne Hunter	Episode: "To Grandmother's House We Go" (S 2:Ep 25)	
1995	Living Single	Laverne Hunter	Episode: "Talk Showdown" (S 2:Ep 26)	
1995	Living Single	Laverne Hunter	Episode: "Come Back Little Diva" (S 3:Ep 1)	
1995	Living Single	Laverne Hunter	Episode: "Rags to Riches" (S 3:Ep 5)	
1996	Kirk	Nurse	Episode" Operation Kirk" (S 1:Ep 20)	
1996	Living Single	Laverne Hunter	Episode: "Compromising Positions" (S 3:Ep 26)	
1997	Living Single	Laverne Hunter	Episode: "Mother Inferior" (S 4:Ep 13)	
1997	Living Single	Laverne Hunter	Episode: "Never Can Say Goodbye" (S 4:Ep 24)	
1997	Living Single	Woman	Episode: "Up the Ladder Through the Roof" (S 5:Ep 6)	
1997	Living Single	Laverne Hunter	Episode: "Three Men and a Buckeye" (S 5:Ep 8)	
1998	The Wayans Bros.	Susan Sparks	Episode: "Escorting Ain't Easy" (S 5:Ep 6)	
2000	The Parkers	Wilma McCoy	Episode: "Turkey Day Blues" (S 2:Ep 10)	
2007	Just Jordan	Gert	Episode: "Fist of Funny" (S 1:Ep 8)	

=== Production ===
==== Film ====
Year	Title	Role	Notes	Ref.
1993	Menace II Society	Dialogue coach	Hood drama thriller film directed by Allen and Albert Hughes	

==== Television ====
Year	Title	Role	Notes	Ref.
1993–94	Hangin' with Mr. Cooper	Consultant	Television sitcom	
1993–94	Living Single	Consultant	Television sitcom	
1994	Me and the Boys	Dialogue consultant	Television sitcom	
1994	Hangin' with Mr. Cooper	Director	Episode: "Groom & Bride" (S 2:Ep 21)	
1997	Arsenio	Consultant	Television sitcom	
1999	Zenon: Girl of the 21st Century	Consultant	Disney Channel Original Movie directed by Kenneth Johnson	
1999	Sister, Sister	Director	Episode: "The Road Less Traveled" (S 6:Ep 21)	
2000–03	The Parkers	Consultant (69 episodes)/Director (4 episodes)	Television sitcom	
2001	Girlfriends	Director	Episode: "You Better Watch Out" (S 2:Ep 11)	
2003–05	Romeo!	Director	Television sitcom (7 episodes)	
2003–06	One on One	Director	Television sitcom (5 episodes)	
2005	All of Us	Director	Episode: "If You Can't Stand the Heat" (S 3:Ep 2)	
2006	Hannah Montana	Director	Episode: "You're So Vain, You Probably Think This Zit Is About You" (S 1:Ep 13)	
2007	Ned's Declassified School Survival Guide	Director	Television sitcom (3 episodes)	
2007	Just Jordan	Director	Television sitcom (4 episodes)	
2009	Meet the Browns	Director	Television sitcom (2 episodes)	
2009–12	House of Payne	Director	Television sitcom (12 episodes)	
2020–25	Young Dylan	Director	Television sitcom (44 episodes)	
