= Guess Who's Coming to Breakfast =

Guess Who's Coming to Breakfast may refer to:

- "Guess Who's Coming to Breakfast?" (Frasier), an episode of the television series Frasier
- "Guess Who's Coming to Breakfast?", an episode of the television series Las Vegas
- "Guess Who's Coming To Breakfast?" (1968) the British release title of a German film originally called Die Nichten der Frau Oberst, directed by Erwin C. Dietrich

== See also ==
- "Guess Who Came to Breakfast", an episode of the television series Tyler Perry's House of Payne
- "Guess Who's Coming to Breakfast, Lunch and Dinner", an episode of the sitcom Married... with Children
- "Guess Who's Coming to Breakfast, Lunch and Dinner", an episode of the television series The New Lassie
- "Guess Who's Coming for Brefnish", an episode of the television series Taxi
