= Tyler Perry's House of Payne =

American television sitcom

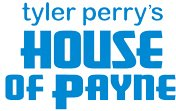
- Also known as: House of Payne
- Genre: Sitcom; Dramedy; Romance; Soap opera
- Created by: Tyler Perry
- Starring: LaVan Davis; Cassi Davis; Allen Payne; Lance Gross; Doc Shaw; China Anne McClain; Denise Burse; Demetria McKinney; Keshia Knight Pulliam; Palmer Williams Jr.; Ahmarie Holmes; Quin Walters
- Country of origin: United States
- Original language: English
- No. of seasons: 12
- No. of episodes: 400 (list of episodes)

Production
- Executive producer: Tyler Perry
- Camera setup: Multi-camera
- Running time: 20–23 minutes
- Production companies: Tyler Perry Studios; Georgia Media; SAG-AFTRA; BET Original Productions

Original release
- Network: Syndication
- Release: June 21 – July 19, 2006
- Network: TBS
- Release: June 6, 2007 – August 10, 2012
- Network: BET
- Release: September 2, 2020 – present

Related
- The Paynes; Meet the Browns; Love Thy Neighbor; Assisted Living

Tyler Perry's House of Payne, also known as simply House of Payne, is an American sitcom television series created and produced by Tyler Perry that premiered in syndication on June 21, 2006.

The series revolves around a multi-generational family living under one roof in Atlanta led by patriarch Curtis Payne and his wife Ella. While primarily a comedy, with elements of slapstick, House of Payne is known for featuring dark themes and subject matter, such as substance abuse and addiction.

Reaching 254 episodes upon the conclusion of its sixth season, House of Payne has aired more episodes than any other television series with a predominantly African American cast, surpassing The Jeffersons with 253 episodes, Family Matters with 215 episodes, and The Cosby Show with 202 episodes. The series aired its 300th episode on October 26, 2021, and its 400th episode on March 11, 2026.

== Production history ==
The sitcom ran in first-run syndication for 10 episodes during mid-2006 on the Atlanta-area broadcast of WTBS (now WPCH-TV), along with nine other broadcast outlets across the country, as a limited run, with additional episodes to be available for national distribution on TBS in June 2007. An order of 100 episodes was later requested by TBS.

A cable record for sitcom airings was broken with 5.2 and 5.8 million for the two premiere episodes on TBS on June 6, 2007. However, the audience declined to 4.3 million as of the week ending September 30, 2007, and 2.260 and 2.099 as of May 19, 2010.

The principal cast remained the same (with the exception of Lance Gross being added), led by LaVan Davis. The original format of the series centred around C.J. (Allen Payne) and his family moving in with his Aunt Ella (Cassi Davis) and Uncle Curtis (LaVan Davis). Robinne Lee had a recurring guest stint in Season 1–2 as Malik and Jazmine's principal Nicole Jamieson, whom C.J. began dating. Rochelle Aytes originally portrayed Nicole Jamieson in the test pilot episodes as Malik's math teacher. In the test run, Ella and Curtis were originally C.J.'s parents and his name was Curtis Jr., but in its televised format, Calvin is their son and C.J. their nephew and his name was changed to Clarence. Despite his top billing, Allen Payne is not considered the main actor of the series, especially since his long absence in the fifth season. The show was recorded in front of a live studio audience but sometimes used a laugh track.

At the beginning of the fifth season, China Anne McClain (Jazmine) and Denise Burse (Claretha) were removed from the series. The characters were written out, with Jazmine going away to a school for gifted children in North Carolina and Claretha marrying a prince and moving away. In real life, McClain had gotten her own show on Disney Channel (A.N.T. Farm) and Burse left the series for undisclosed reasons. In the beginning of Season 6, both McClain and Burse returned (albeit in a recurring role). Some of the cast members of Tyler Perry's House of Payne were on The Mo'Nique Show in October 2009. Beginning with the seventh season, China Anne McClain appeared infrequently due to her work schedule for A.N.T. Farm. Denise Burse was no longer credited as a regular cast member; she appeared in a recurring role.

Larramie "Doc" Shaw, who portrayed Malik, appeared infrequently after the sixth season. This was due to Shaw's work schedules for The Suite Life on Deck and Pair of Kings. He remained a cast member throughout the series.

Tyler Perry directed every episode of the first 3 seasons. Throughout Season 4, each episode was directed by actress Kim Fields or her mother Chip Hurd. Tyler Perry directed some of the episodes in seasons 5 and 6 while other episodes were directed by Kim Fields, Chip Hurd, and producer Roger M. Bobb.

On September 28, 2011, TBS ordered 42 episodes. The second half of Season 5 began airing October 21, 2011, and concluded the series with a total of 254 episodes. The show aired its final two episodes on August 10, 2012.

On January 30, 2017, a spin-off follow-up series titled The Paynes was ordered by Oprah Winfrey Network. It follows Ella and Curtis Payne as they enjoy retirement in Florida only to get caught in a real-estate deal that turns their lives upside down. The series was greenlighted for 38 episodes and premiered on January 16, 2018.

After a possible revival was teased on Twitter, it was officially announced on February 4, 2020, that House of Payne would return with a seventh season to premiere on BET in the fall. The seventh season premiered on September 2, 2020.

On May 3, 2021, it was announced that the eighth season would premiere on May 25, 2021. On the same day, it was renewed for a ninth season ahead of the eighth-season premiere. The ninth season premiered on March 23, 2022. The tenth season premiered on March 22, 2023. On April 16, 2024, the series was renewed for an eleventh season, which premiered on August 13, 2024.

== Setting ==
Locations in Atlanta, Georgia, include the Paynes' home, a firehouse located across the street from the Paynes' house, a barbershop, the help center, and the schools Malik and Jazmine attend. The Payne home is a one-story building, and 5 rooms are featured throughout the series: Curtis and Ella's bedroom, Malik and Jazmine's shared bedroom, the spare bedroom (which was Calvin's until he moved out), the kitchen, and the living room, and the outside patio. Calvin, C.J. and Janine's rooms were never seen. The only part of the firehouse seen on camera was its day room. The firehouse and its characters were phased out around Seasons 3 and 4. The barbershop is a setting often used from Seasons 2–5, and it is similar to that of Ice Cube's Barbershop movies. Miranda and Calvin's condo was also added in season two, but the living room was the only room that was shown. C.J. and Janine's house is another setting added on to the series. The kitchen and the living were always seen on camera. None of the bedrooms were ever shown. The university Malik attended was a more recent setting and various areas were shown. And C.J.'s office where he and Janine work was another setting that was added to the series. Also, the Help Center where Ella works was shown in various forms.

== Episodes ==
Season	Episodes		Originally released		
Season	Episodes		First released	Last released	Network
1	10		June 21, 2006	July 19, 2006	Syndication
2	100	37	June 6, 2007	September 26, 2007	TBS
2	100	22	December 5, 2007	January 30, 2008	TBS
2	100	16	March 5, 2008	April 23, 2008	TBS
2	100	25	June 4, 2008	August 4, 2008	TBS
3	26		December 3, 2008	June 3, 2009	TBS
4	46		November 4, 2009	January 19, 2011	TBS
5	40	20	March 30, 2011	June 15, 2011	TBS
5	40	20	October 21, 2011	January 13, 2012	TBS
6	42		January 20, 2012	August 10, 2012	TBS
7	25		September 2, 2020	January 13, 2021	BET
8	22		May 25, 2021	January 18, 2022	BET
9	22		March 23, 2022	December 28, 2022	BET
10	22		March 22, 2023	September 6, 2023	BET
11	22	16	August 13, 2024	December 17, 2024	BET
11	22	6	March 25, 2025	April 16, 2025	BET
12	23	10	April 30, 2025	July 2, 2025	BET
12	23	7	November 5, 2025	December 17, 2025	BET
12	23	6	February 4, 2026	March 11, 2026	BET

== Cast ==
House of Payne revolves around the Payne family who resides in the suburban Atlanta. It is noted that all main cast members are credited only for the episodes in which they appear.

Actor	Character	Seasons											
Actor	Character	1	2	3	4	5	6	7	8	9	10	11	12
LaVan Davis	Curtis Booker T. Payne	Main	Main	Main	Main	Main	Main	Main	Main	Main	Main	Main	Main
Cassi Davis	Ella Williams-Payne	Main	Main	Main	Main	Main	Main	Main	Main	Main	Main	Main	Main
Allen Payne	Clarence "C.J." Payne Jr.	Main	Main	Main	Main	Main	Main	Main	Main	Main	Main	Main	Main
Larramie "Doc" Shaw	Malik Payne	Main	Main	Main	Main	Main	Main	Main	Main	Main	Main	Main	Main
China Anne McClain	Jazmine Sierra Payne	Main	Main	Main	Main		Main	Main	Main	Main			Main
Denise Burse	Claretha Jenkins	Main	Main	Main	Main	Recurring	Recurring						
Lance Gross	Calvin Payne	Main	Main	Main	Main	Main	Main	Main	Main	Main	Main	Main	Main
Demetria McKinney	Janine Shelton-Payne	Main	Main	Main	Main	Main	Main	Recurring			Recurring	Recurring	Recurring
Keshia Knight Pulliam	Miranda Lucas-Payne		Main	Main	Main	Main	Main	Main	Main	Main	Main	Main	Main
Palmer Williams Jr.	Floyd Jackson		Recurring	Recurring	Recurring	Main	Recurring	Main		Recurring	Recurring	Recurring	Recurring
Bobb'e J. Thompson	Deshawn Spears			Recurring	Recurring								
Ahmarie Holmes	Lisa							Main	Main	Main	Main	Main	Recurring
Quin Walters	Laura							Main	Main	Main	Main	Main	Main

=== Main ===
- LaVan Davis as Curtis Payne, the show's main protagonist. He is often referred to as Uncle Curtis by his nephew C.J., his nephew's wife Janine, and their children, Malik and Jazmine. Curtis is known for his hackneyed jokes and overly-loud delivery. He is overweight and fainted once from a blocked artery, but he ignored the diet his wife Ella set for him and is unable to stay away from his usual fatty foods. A noticeable running gag is when he jokingly pushes Ella to the side with one arm when he wants to go by, she usually lands on the sofa. Despite such immaturity, his maturity and responsibility are apparent in his job as the chief of the local fire department. While he gives off the impression that he does not care for his family, deep down he truly does, and he works hard to protect them. In one episode, his middle name was revealed as Booker T. In the sixth season, Curtis was forced to retire which left him depressed and humiliated for a time; he eventually embraced it and his nephew C.J. took over his old job. LaVan Davis won an NAACP Image Awards in 2008 for Outstanding Actor In A Comedy Series for this role. In the first part of the original series finale, "The Call Back", CJ asks Curtis to come out of retirement to oversee three stations that CJ runs. At first, Curtis refuses and yells at CJ saying how they already forced him into retirement, and that he was not going back, but at the end of the episode, after talking with Ella, he decided to return. In the revival, Curtis is retired again and decides to open his own barbeque business "Sauce Bosses". During Season 10, LaVan Davis appears infrequently for undisclosed reasons, but around that time, his character is expanding his business.
- Cassi Davis as Ella Payne (née Williams), Curtis's wife who's a Christian. She is a stay-at-home mother and the voice of reason. Curtis has been known to take advantage of Ella's good nature—and to be punished for it. Ella is the family's religious voice and the glue that holds it together. A good cook, she had a restaurant service in one episode. She is quick to offer emotional and moral support to everyone in the family, such as when Janine returned home. In the fifth season, she briefly worked in retail, but throughout the series, she works at the local Help Center. In Season 6, she quits going back to school. Ella graduated from college and finally got her degree in Season 7. It is revealed that her middle name is Naomi. She tries to keep the family at peace the best she can, whether it's big or small. In the Season 8 episode "RIP: Rest in Payne", she keeps complete faith for her son Calvin when she hears that he got shot in C.J. and Janine's home. She loves her family and wants her husband to keep her safe and stand by her, which he does.
- Allen Payne as Clarence James (C.J.) Payne Jr., Curtis and Ella's nephew, the son of Curtis' late brother. He moved his wife and kids into Uncle Curtis and Aunt Ella's home when their own house burned down after his wife Janine accidentally started a fire under the influence of drugs. C.J. is the father of Malik, Jazmine, Jayden, and Hayden Payne; these last two are the twin son and daughter born to Janine and C.J. after they reconciled and remarried. In the fourth season, C.J. found out he was adopted. He works at the firehouse with Curtis. At the end of the fifth season, he, Janine, and the twins moved to Chicago, but they returned in the sixth season after he was offered Curtis' job, and the family moved in next to Curtis and Ella. Despite being angry with and hostile towards Janine upon her return, C.J. never stopped loving her. In the early seasons, C.J. often has difficulty enforcing discipline with his children, but it is apparent that he is slightly more strict and hot-headed, often jumping to the wrong conclusions. In the Season 6 episode "Who's Your Daddy Now?", C.J. finally met his real father who happened to be white, making C.J. biracial. In the seventh season, he was promoted to fire chief commissioner, and also became the boss of Janine and Roland in the public-relations department. C.J. was portrayed as Curtis and Ella's son in the series' original format, but his character was changed to being their nephew.
- Lance Gross as Calvin Payne, Ella and Curtis's only son, created exclusively for the TBS/BET iteration of the series. At the start of the series, he was a college student who rarely attended class. It took him several years to finish and graduate. Calvin liked to think of himself as a player until he married Miranda. Like his cousin C.J., Calvin spends much time working with Curtis at the firehouse until he becomes a partner at the barbershop, and ultimately finds his calling working in the public relations department for the local fire department. He eventually finds out that he has a son, Calvin Jr., then started working in the public relations department with C.J., Janine, and Roland in Season 8. Calvin also learns Miranda is pregnant with his child, and their son Christian is born. Calvin later gets shot by a man named Travis, who he previously fought for hitting on his wife. He is found by Janine and taken to a hospital, where he survives. He has a slow recovery that strains his relationship. However, while in court, he confronts his shooter and states he forgives Travis, stating he realized what a waste it would be to stay angry. He leaves the court without being concerned how long Travis' sentence is. In the original finale, "All's Well", his wife Miranda demands a divorce. Calvin responds by angrily throwing a vase of flowers at the wall, and the episode ends with the camera zoomed in on the broken glass and rose petals. In the revival, it is revealed that he and Miranda have been going through the divorce process for several years. Despite Miranda regretting her decision and pleading for reconciliation, Calvin openly rejects her offers and resents her meddling in his love life.
- Larramie "Doc" Shaw as Malik Payne, C.J. and Janine's college-aged son. He is a young adult whose interest in young women in his class is so extreme that he'll resort to desperate measures, such as trying out for the cheerleading squad, just to associate with them. Initially, he was often bullied in school as a result of his mother's drug problems. As a result, he is reluctant to welcome her back to the household. It is hinted that he is allergic to peanuts and knows how to cut hair. Beginning with the sixth season, Malik has appeared infrequently, due to Doc Shaw's work schedule, as he also starred on The Suite Life on Deck on Disney Channel and Pair of Kings on Disney XD. His absence is incorporated into the storyline, as he goes to the ROTC during Season 6 and off to college during Season 7. While in college, he dates a girl named Summer (Makeda Declet). Malik then marries Summer just so they can have sex. Summer then wants a divorce from Malik to transfer to a college in New England, but since Malik and Summer have only been married for a few weeks, they are qualified for an annulment and that's how their marriage ended. In the revival, Malik met a new girl named Lisa and immediately gets her pregnant and later welcomed a baby girl named Malisa. He struggles to maintain a balance between family and school life.
- China Anne McClain as Jazmine Payne (seasons 1–4 & 6–9, 12), C.J. and Janine's daughter. She constantly feels invisible and acts out to get her father's attention while her mother is in rehab. At one point, Jazmine had a brief crush on Malik's friend Kevin. Despite her apparent innocence and youth, throughout the series, she was known to act cruel and mean toward Malik and Kevin and schemed to make them miserable. She is also known to have sarcastic comments and sly plans to get what she wants. For undisclosed reasons, China Anne McClain was written out of the series during the fifth season, which made her the only cast member to not appear in Season 5. She was re-introduced into the series when she returned in the sixth season. It is hinted that she has a fear of mimes that wear hats. On the premiere of the seventh season, she is 12 years old, and Janine lets her wear lip gloss, and she falls in with the wrong crowd. Jazmine has made infrequent appearances since the seventh season, due to China Anne McClain's work schedule, as she also starred in A.N.T. Farm on Disney Channel. China Anne McClain appeared in the season 9 revival season, but during season 10, she does not appear. In the revival season, it is revealed that Jazmine is now attending college and has a boyfriend named Caleb. She returns in season 12 as an aid to Ella's church.
- Demetria McKinney as Janine Payne (née Shelton), C.J.'s wife and the mother of Malik, Jazmine, Jayden, and Hayden Payne. A seemingly responsible adult and mother at the very beginning of the series, she is later revealed to be a drug addict and the one who burned down her and C.J.'s house. She and C.J. divorce after she leaves her family. Initially, she was only a recurring character and was rarely seen in the series except in episodes where she associates with Ella Payne, who helps her enter a rehab program and return to the family. Later in the series, she is often criticized by C.J., Curtis, and Malik for her irresponsible actions. She is apparently impregnated by her boyfriend until an episode reveals that he's sterile. Since C.J. is the only other person she has had intercourse with (in an earlier episode, where they were intimate while C.J. was drunk), she realizes that C.J. is the father of the coming child. C.J. and Janine remarry at Calvin and Miranda's wedding; almost immediately, her water breaks and she gives birth to twins Jayden and Hayden Payne. Janine's parents are Larry and Liz Shelton. She and C.J. now live in their own home with their four children. In seasons 6–7, her role in the series has grown more central as she focuses more on her career than her home life—and becomes the target of romantic interest from her boss Roland until C.J. gets promoted to the commissioner and becomes both Janine and Roland's boss and makes them keep their relationship professional. From that point on, C.J. and Janine both have the same job together and are able to focus on both their career and home life together. Due to McKinney's work schedule on three other television programs, Janine plays a reduced role in the BET revival seasons.
- Keshia Knight Pulliam as Miranda Payne (née Lucas) (episodes 72–present; guest star episode 37), Calvin's girlfriend-turned-wife. She was first introduced in Season 1 as a con artist who stole all of Calvin and Curtis' money for an art gallery. The character returned eventually, but what she did to Calvin and Curtis is only very briefly mentioned. She and Calvin married in the Season 4 conclusion. Miranda has a troubled, bratty nephew; when Calvin was supposed to be in charge of him, it was actually the boy who ordered Calvin around. Miranda and Calvin began to have problems in the fifth season. At the beginning of the sixth season, a pregnant Miranda disappears; a couple of episodes later, Miranda says there is no baby, making Calvin believe she had an abortion, but she did not. She is actually thinking about giving the baby up for adoption. Then, while all three couples (C.J and Janine, Curtis and Ella, Calvin and Miranda) go to a marriage retreat, Miranda asks Calvin for a divorce. But when she and Calvin go to a divorce mediator and get stuck in an elevator, they resolve their marriage problems with help from an "elevator lady" Edi who turns out to be Dr. Marcos, the marriage-retreat counselor. Calvin and Miranda had their baby in Season 7. In the original series finale, "All's Well", Miranda demands a divorce after realizing they have become incompatible. The last scene shows Calvin throwing a vase of flowers at the wall, and the series ends with the camera zoomed in on the broken glass and rose petals. In the revival, it is revealed that Miranda and Calvin have been going through the divorce process for several years. It is also shown she had deeply regretted her choice and tries to reconcile with Calvin but he refuses and chastises her whenever she involves herself in his relationships.
- Denise Burse as Claretha Jenkins (seasons 1–6; recurring seasons 7 & 8), Ella's friend and the Paynes' former next-door neighbor. Curtis constantly jokes about her annoyance at his presence. Claretha has a big mouth; she even rats out the family business to the media in a crime misconception. She is known for having a collection of wigs. She left at the beginning of Season 5 after marrying a "prince". In Season 6, she suddenly leaves the prince and now goes out with Floyd. She has an exceedingly obese daughter named Huretha and was furious and disgusted when she went out with C.J. In the early seasons after Janine left, although Huretha was never seen on the show. In the Season 7 episode "Payneful Visit", it is revealed that she has leukemia.
- Palmer Williams Jr. as Floyd Jackson (main seasons 8 & 10–present; recurring seasons 3–7 & 9), Curtis' friend and the self-absorbed, proud owner of the Barber Shop. He shows little affection towards individual people, but in times of great need will come out and show affection. His first wife disappeared on him, but after he remarried, the first wife returned looking for a divorce. When he did sign the divorce papers, it turned out she'd written a book, and since he's divorced from her he gets nothing. He has a daughter named Olivia who was dating Zack, one of his barbers. In season 6, Floyd's second wife kicks him out so he moves into Curtis and Ella's back yard and started dating Claretha, until his second wife returned, having lost fifty pounds because she was depressed that they were splitting up. While Floyd had been hoping to string both along without either finding out about the other until they bumped into each other in the Payne house and both subsequently broke up with him and Claretha kicked him out. Floyd's middle name is revealed to be Stanley. He is the longest-running recurring character on House of Payne. In mid-Season 8, he joined the main cast. In the season 10 revival, Floyd becomes a stand-in for Curtis and becomes a surrogate father to the Payne family while Curtis is away expanding his barbeque business.
- Ahmarie Holmes as Lisa (season 9–present), Malik's new girlfriend & fiancée and mother to their daughter Malisa.
- Quin Walters as Laura (season 9–present), Calvin's new love interest and fiancée after his split from Miranda.

=== Others ===
- Keke Palmer as Nikki Grady-Simmons (Season 1)
- Eva Marcille as Tracie Evans (Seasons 1–2, 5–7)
- Bart Hansard as Bart Holmes (Seasons 1–4, 6)
- Cedric Pendleton as Keenan Jared (Seasons 1–4, 6, 8)
- Joyce Giraud as Angel (Seasons 1–4,)
- Dorian Harewood as Larry Shelton (Seasons 1, 3, 5)
- Anne-Marie Johnson as Liz Shelton (Seasons 1, 3, 5–6)
- Robinne Lee as Nicole Jamieson (Seasons 1–2)
- Rochelle Aytes as Nicole Jamieson (2006 syndicated pilot episodes)
- Sierra Aylina McClain as Jasmine (Season 1)
- Katie Rowlett as Beverly (Season 1)
- Arvell Poe as Fishbone (Season 1)
- Quincy Bonds as Pookie (Seasons 1–6, 10)
- Clayton English as Peanut (Seasons 1–6, 10)
- Kyre Batiste-Loftin as Kevin (Seasons 1–6)
- Jamie Moore as Walter (Season 1)
- Dale Neal as Kyle (Seasons 1–2)
- Wilbur Fitzgerald as Bill (Season 1)
- Robin Givens as Tanya (Seasons 2–4)
- Michael Jai White as Bryan (2006 syndicated pilot episodes and Seasons 3)
- Femi Emiola as Sheila (Season 3)
- Jason Dirden as Delante (Seasons 3–4)
- Denyce Lawton as Dana Carter (Seasons 3–5)
- Bobbi Baker as KiKi (Seasons 3–6)
- Kim Coles as Bernice (Season 3)
- Dorien Wilson as Andrew (Season 4)
- Wendell Pierce as Jeffrey Lucas (Seasons 4–5)
- Valarie Pettiford as Sandra Lucas (Seasons 4–7)
- Marvin Winans as Pastor Richards (Seasons 4–5, and 8)
- Demille Cole-Heard as Calvin Jr. (Seasons 5–8)
- Marlene Forte as Rosalita Hernandez (Season 5)
- Mel Rodriguez as Carlos Hernandez (Season 5)
- Renée Victor as Consuela Hernandez (Season 5)
- Susie Castillo as Mercedes Hernandez (Season 5)
- J. R. Ramirez as Diego Hernandez (Seasons 5–6)
- Veronica Sixtos as Alexandra Hernandez (Season 5)
- Gary Owen as Zack (Season 5)
- Roberto Roman as Andy Rodriguez (Season 5)
- Boris Kodjoe as David (Season 5)
- Aloma Wright as Eunice (Seasons 5 and 8)
- Gladys Knight as Herself (Season 5)
- Kinnik Sky as Nurse Jones (Season 5)
- Ben Vereen as Clarence (Season 6)
- Penny Johnson Jerald as Maxine Bannet (Season 6)
- Essence Atkins as Monica (Season 6)
- Rick Fox as Roland (Seasons 6–8)
- Heavy D as P-Rock (Season 7)
- Janet Hubert-Whitten as Evie (Evelyn) (Season 8)
- Corey Holcomb as Damon (Season 8)
- Sherman Hemsley as George Jefferson (Season 8)
- Marla Gibbs as Florence Johnston (Season 8)
- Sheryl Lee Ralph as Felicia Starr (Season 8)
- Shaun T. as Mo Pex (Season 8)
- Troy Winbush as Travis Harris (Season 8)
- Makeda Declet as Summer (Season 8)
- Royce Johnson as Councilman Dustman (Seasons 11–12)

=== Special appearances ===
- Tyler Perry as Madea (Seasons 1–3)
- Keke Palmer as Nikki Grady-Simmons (Season 1)
- Tamela Mann as Cora Simmons (Seasons 1 and 6)
- David Mann as Mr. Leroy Brown (Seasons 1 and 6)
- Lamman Rucker as Will Brown (Season 1)
- Marvin Winans as Pastor Richards (Seasons 4–5, and 8)
- Dorien Wilson as Andrew (Season 4)
- Gladys Knight as Herself (Season 5)
- Boris Kodjoe as David (Season 5)
- Ben Vereen as Clarence (Season 6)
- Rick Fox as Roland (Seasons 6–7)
- Jacob Latimore as Dante (Season 7)
- Shameik Moore as Andre (Season 7)
- Heavy D as P-Rock (Season 7)
- Sherman Hemsley as George Jefferson (Season 8)
- Marla Gibbs as Florence Johnston (Season 8)
- Sheryl Lee Ralph as Felicia Starr (Season 8)
- Shaun T as Mo Pex (Season 8)
- Cheryl Pepsii Riley as Gloria (Season 11)
- Merrick McCartha as Frederick (Season 12)
- Jaxon (Tré Boyd) – A college classmate of Jazmine Payne. He initially serves as an antagonist after plagiarizing her academic work and placing her internship eligibility at risk. After being placed on academic probation, he is forced to collaborate with Jazmine on a media group project, eventually making amends, earning her forgiveness, and developing romantic intentions toward her. (Season 11,12 and 13)

== Releases ==
Lionsgate Home Entertainment has released the first 10 volumes on DVD in Region 1. It is unknown about the release of the two remaining volumes. According to listings of the previous volumes through Amazon.com, the series DVD releases has been put out of print.

DVD title	Ep #	Release date	Blu-ray Disc
Tyler Perry's House of Payne Volume 1	1–20	December 4, 2007	
Tyler Perry's House of Payne Volume 2	21–40	July 1, 2008	
Tyler Perry's House of Payne Volume 3	41–60	January 13, 2009	
Tyler Perry's House of Payne Volume 4	61–80	June 16, 2009	
Tyler Perry's House of Payne Volume 5	81–100	January 13, 2010	
Tyler Perry's House of Payne Volume 6	101–124	February 8, 2011	
Tyler Perry's House of Payne Volume 7	125–148	April 5, 2011	
Tyler Perry's House of Payne Volume 8	149–172	June 14, 2011	
Tyler Perry's House of Payne Volume 9	173–192	June 19, 2012	
Tyler Perry's House of Payne Volume 10	193–212	March 5, 2013	
Tyler Perry's House of Payne Volume 11	213–233	TBA	
Tyler Perry's House of Payne Volume 12	234–254	TBA	
