= Lance Gross =

Ghanaian American actor (born 1981)

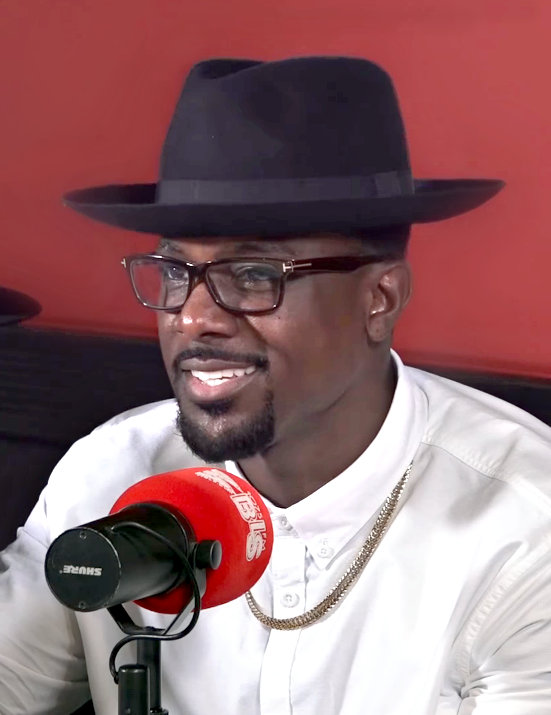
- Gross in 2017
- Born: Lance Darnell Gross; July 8, 1981 (age 45); Oakland, California, U.S.
- Education: Howard University
- Occupations: Actor; model; photographer
- Years active: 2006–present
- Spouse: Rebecca Jefferson
- Children: 2

Lance Darnell Gross (born July 8, 1981) is a Ghanaian-American actor and model. He is known for his role as Calvin Payne on the TBS/BET sitcom Tyler Perry's House of Payne (2007–2012; 2020–present), for which he won four NAACP Image Award for Outstanding Supporting Actor in a Comedy Series.

Gross made his big screen debut starring in the 2008 romantic comedy-drama film, Meet the Browns. He later starred in films Our Family Wedding (2010), The Last Fall (2012) and Temptation: Confessions of a Marriage Counselor (2013). On television, Gross starred as Secret Service Agent Marcus Finley in the short-lived NBC political drama series, Crisis (2014) and later was regular cast member in Sleepy Hollow (2015–2016), Star (2017–2019) and Our Kind of People (2021–2022).

== Early life ==
Gross was born in Oakland, California, the child of an African American mother and Ghanaian immigrant father, and later moved to Las Vegas, Nevada, to attend and graduate from Bonanza High School. He went on to attend Howard University, where he earned a Bachelor of Arts in theater. He then trained at The Ivanna Chubbuck Studio as well as the Tasha Smith Acting Studio.

== Career ==
Gross began his career by modeling for Karl Kani and appearing in music videos for artists such as Mary J. Blige, Rihanna and Mariah Carey. In 2006, he had minor roles in Eve and The Bernie Mac Show. He was consequently cast as Calvin Payne on Perry's new sitcom House of Payne in 2006. In the show Gross plays Calvin, a young professional who has attended college for seven years. He has been awarded four NAACP Image Awards for Outstanding Supporting Actor in a Comedy Series for this role.

2008 saw Gross make his big screen debut in the romantic comedy-drama film Meet the Browns opposite Angela Bassett. His next big screen appearance was in the 2010 romantic comedy-drama Our Family Wedding alongside America Ferrera, in which they portrayed a recently engaged young couple whose wedding preparations are disrupted by their families. In 2012, he starred in the independent film The Last Fall, the story of a retired NFL player dealing with financial and family difficulties. Also in 2012, Gross starred as Sammy Desoto in the Lifetime remake of Steel Magnolias.

In 2013, Gross starred opposite Jurnee Smollett-Bell in the romantic drama film Temptation: Confessions of a Marriage Counselor directed by Tyler Perry. It received predominantly negative reviews from critics. The following year he went to star in the short-lived NBC political drama series, Crisis. In 2015 he guest-starred in two episodes of ABC medical drama Grey's Anatomy playing Dr. Ethan Boyd. Later in 2015 he joined the cast of Fox series Sleepy Hollow. In 2016, Gross returned to film starring alongside Larenz Tate and Meagan Good in the crime drama Deuces for Netflix. In 2017, he starred in the crime drama film When Love Kills: The Falicia Blakely Story directed by Tasha Smith. From 2017 to 2019, he played Maurice Jetter in the Fox musical drama series, Star. In 2018, on OWN's The Paynes, he made appearances as a recurring character in the episodes "A Surprise for the Paynes", "Revelations of Payne" and "A Confrontation of Payne", along with Allen Payne, Demetria McKinney, Larramie "Doc" Shaw and China Anne McClain. In 2018, he co-starred in the BET miniseries The Bobby Brown Story. Gross also had recurring roles on CBS series MacGyver and Hawaii Five-0.

In 2021, Gross played the leading role in the crime drama film, Dutch. He later starred in the Fox prime time soap opera, Our Kind of People opposite Yaya DaCosta. The series was cancelled after one season. In 2022 he co-starred opposite Karen Pittman in the romantic comedy film Unthinkably Good Things and in 2023 starred alongside Naturi Naughton in the action thriller film Call Her King.

== Personal life ==
In July 2006, Gross began dating actress Eva Marcille. The couple became engaged on December 24, 2008, and split up in March 2010. On May 23, 2015, Gross married fashion stylist Rebecca Jefferson The couple are parents to two children, daughter, Berkeley Brynn Gross (born November 20, 2014), and son, Lennon Lorin Gross (born July 10, 2018).

In November 2021, Gross became initiated as an official member of Kappa Alpha Psi.

== Filmography ==
=== Film ===
Year	Title	Role	Notes
2008	Meet the Browns	Michael Brown	
2010	Our Family Wedding	Marcus Boyd	
2012	The Last Fall	Kyle Bishop	
2013	Temptation: Confessions of a Marriage Counselor	Brice	
2016	The Phenom	Lee Brooks	
2017	Deuces	Jason Foster	
2017	When Love Kills: The Falicia Blakely Story	Dino	
2021	Dutch	Benard "Dutch" James	
2022	Erax	Cliff	Short film
2022	Unthinkably Good Things	Andre	
2023	Call Her King	Gabriel aka. Black Caesar	
2024	Dutch II: Angel's Revenge	Benard "Dutch" James	
2024	Snatched	Byron	
2025	I Will Survive: The Gloria Gaynor Story	TBA	
2025	Sugar Baby	Anthony	
2025	Dutch III: International Gangster	Benard "Dutch" James	Post—production
TBA	Free	Mr. White	Post—production

=== Television ===
Year	Title	Role	Notes
2006	Eve	Choir Member	1 episode
2006	The Bernie Mac Show	Krumper #1	1 episode
2007–2012; 2020–present	Tyler Perry's House of Payne	Calvin Payne	Main role; 188 episodes
2012	Steel Magnolias	Sammy Desoto	TV movie
2012	The Finder	Frank Haywood	1 episode
2012	Royal Pains	Dr. London	1 episode
2013	Dice City	Derek	Main role
2014	Crisis	U.S. Secret Service Agent Marcus Finley	Main role
2015	Grey's Anatomy	Ethan	Supporting role
2015–16	Sleepy Hollow	Daniel Reynolds	Main role
2017–2019	Tales	Reggie	Episodes: "Trap Queen" and "Ex-Factor" (co-writer)
2017–2019	Star	Maurice Jetter, (A&R)	Recurring/Main role
2017–2019	MacGyver	Billy Colton	Recurring role
2018	The Paynes	Calvin Payne	3 episodes
2018	The Bobby Brown Story	Steven Sealy	Main role
2020	Hawaii Five-0	Lincoln Cole	2 episodes
2021—2022	Our Kind of People	Tyrique Freeman	Main role
