= Doe et al. v. Trump Corp. et al. =

US District Court case

Patel v. Trump Corp et al.
- Court: Supreme Court of the United States, No. 20 - 1513

Case history
- Appealed from: 2nd U.S. Circuit Court of Appeals, No. 20-1706

Doe et al v. Trump Corp et al.
- Court: 2nd U.S. Circuit Court of Appeals, Nos. 20-1228, 20-1278, 20-1706

Doe et al v. Trump Corp et al.
- Court: U.S. District Court, Southern District of New York, No. 18-cv-09936

Doe et al. v. Trump Corporation et al. is an ongoing case commenced in the U.S. District Court for Southern District of New York in October 2018, in which plaintiffs Lynn Chadwick, Markus Frazier, Catherine McKoy and Millard Williams filed a previously anonymous lawsuit against the Trump Corporation, Donald Trump and three of his adult children — Donald Jr., Eric, and Ivanka — alleging racketeering and of fraudulently encouraging unsophisticated investors to give large amounts of money to organizations connected to the Trumps. It is alleged that the defendants promoted the multi-level marketing company ACN Inc. in exchange for millions of dollars in secret payments from 2005 to 2015. The lawsuit says that Trump "told investors that he had 'experienced the opportunity' and 'done a lot of research,' and that his endorsement was 'not for any money.'" However, it subsequently emerged that Trump was a paid spokesman for at least one of the companies whose products and services he was promoting to investors.

The Trumps have repeatedly sought to compel the case going to arbitration, which is held behind closed doors, based on contracts between ACN and each of the plaintiffs, which includes a clause mandating the resolution of all disputes via binding arbitration. However, the Trumps are not parties to the ACN contracts, nor is ACN a party to the lawsuit. The companies named in the lawsuit, but which are not parties, are: ACN, a seller of videophones; the Trump Network, a vitamin marketing company; and the Trump Institute, which ran real estate marketing seminars. Multiple judges in multiple courts have rejected the Trumps' motion for arbitration, saying it was unfair for the Trumps to demand arbitration. The plaintiffs' lawyer has repeatedly argued that the case was not based on the ACN contract, but on the Trumps' fraud. The Trumps' attempt to compel arbitration was again rejected on 28 July 2021, in a decision which also rejected ACN's effort to use the arbitration clause to refuse to turn over documents to the plaintiffs.

The case was dismissed from federal court on January 12, 2024.

== Timeline ==
=== 2018 ===
On 29 October 2018, four anonymous plaintiffs filed a lawsuit in the District Court for Southern District of New York alleging racketeering by the defendants and of fraudulently encouraging unsophisticated investors to give large amounts of money to organizations connected to the Trumps. In December 2018, a New York federal court upheld the plaintiffs' right to anonymity.

=== 2019 ===
On 14 January 2019, the Trump defendants sought to have charges under the Racketeer Influenced and Corrupt Organizations (RICO) Act dropped from the lawsuit.

On 21 February 2019, by which time the plaintiffs had amended their claim, the Trumps sought to have the remaining claims thrown out.

On 19 July 2019, the Trumps notified the court that they intended to compel arbitration, based on contracts between ACN and each of the plaintiffs, which includes a clause mandating the resolution of all disputes via binding arbitration. The Trumps are not parties to the ACN contracts, nor is ACN a party to the lawsuit.

On 24 July 2019, Judge Lorna Schofield rejected the plaintiffs' RICO claims, but kept alive many or all of the remaining claims in the lawsuit. She rejected the motion, and rebuked the Trumps' behavior which she denounced as "substantively prejudicial towards Plaintiffs and seeks to use the [Federal Arbitration Act] as a vehicle to manipulate the rules of procedure to the Defendants' benefit and Plaintiffs' harm."

On 29 August 2019, the Trumps again requested that the court send the case to arbitration.

=== 2020 ===
On 13 March, as part of the discovery process, Judge Schofield ordered the Trumps to provide business records from The Trump Organization for 15 years, back to 2005. It was alleged that the Trumps had promoted ACN in exchange for millions of dollars in secret payments from 2005 to 2015.

On 8 April, Judge Schofield refused to compel arbitration, saying the plaintiffs had no reason to believe their arbitration agreements with ACN covered the Trumps and saying that it was unfair for the Trumps to demand arbitration only after she had dismissed the racketeering claim.

On 9 April, unaired footage from The Celebrity Apprentice was ruled admissible as evidence.

On 21 April, the plaintiffs accused the Trumps of attempting to stall the lawsuit.

In May, the Trumps requested a pause in proceedings, to allow them to appeal Schofield's 8 April decision not to compel arbitration, which on 18 May Judge Schofield denied.

On 26 May, the Trumps filed an appeal in the Second Circuit Court, and on 29 May that court granted an administration stay on proceedings until the appeal was heard.

On 1 December, the Second Circuit Court, comprising Judges Raymond J. Lohier, Jr., Denny Chin and Robert D. Sack, heard oral argument on the merits. The Trumps again attempted to halt the lawsuit and compel arbitration, while the plaintiffs' lawyer repeated the argument that the case was not based on the ACN contract, but on the Trumps' fraud. The three-judge panel dismissed the Trumps' application and agreed with Schofield's conclusion that it was unfair for the Trumps to demand arbitration. The appellate panel extended the stay until its decision is issued.

=== 2021–2023 ===
On 28 July 2021, the Second Circuit Court of Appeals issued its decision. In a 3-0 decision, the court rejected the Trumps' attempt to force arbitration and also rejected ACN's effort to use the arbitration clause to refuse to turn over documents to the plaintiffs. In August, the plaintiffs agreed to reveal their names, and on 14 September they filed a second amended complaint with their actual names.

Trump and his children were deposed in 2022. In May 2023, the plaintiffs withdrew their claims against the children in order to "streamline the dispute ahead of a trial".

=== 2024 ===
The trial was scheduled for January 29, 2024, but on January 12, U.S. District Judge Lorna G. Schofield dismissed the case from federal court, recommending plaintiffs file their cases in state courts.

== See also ==
- ACN's Iris 3000 Videophone
- Trump Institute
- Trump Network
