= Claudia Jordan =

American model, TV personality

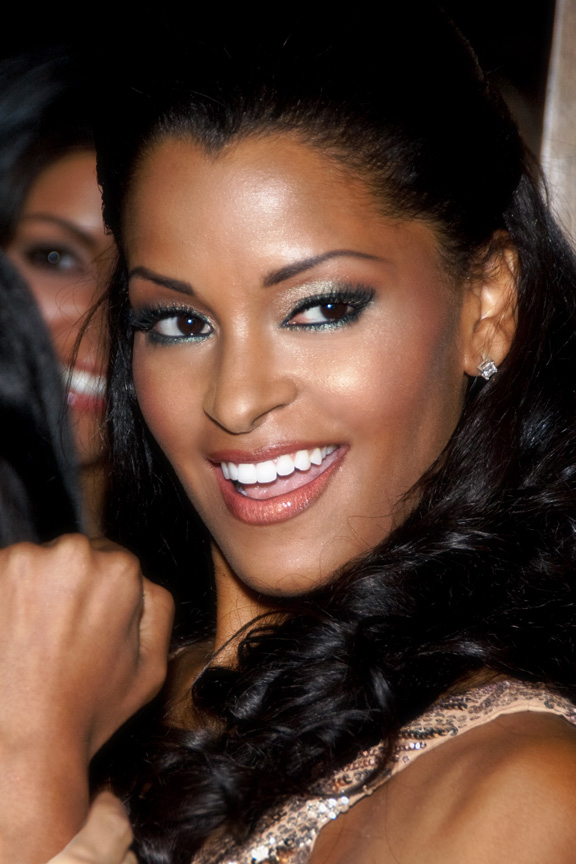
- Jordan in 2008
- Born: Claudia Angela Jordan; April 12, 1973 (age 53); Providence, Rhode Island, U.S.
- Education: Baldwin Wallace University; Long Island University (BA)
- Occupations: Television personality; actress; host; model; businesswoman
- Height: 5 ft 8 in (1.73 m)
- Spouse: Datari Turner (m. 2009; div. 2010)
- Beauty pageant titleholder
- Title: Miss Rhode Island Teen USA 1990; Miss Rhode Island USA 1997
- Years active: 1990–present
- Hair color: Dark brown
- Eye color: Brown
- Major competitions: Miss Rhode Island Teen USA 1990 (Winner); Miss Teen USA 1990; Miss Rhode Island USA 1997 (Winner); Miss USA 1997 (Top 10)

Claudia Angela Jordan (born April 12, 1973) is an American talk show host, actress, model, businesswoman, and reality television and radio personality. She is known for appearing as a model on the American version of Deal or No Deal and The Price Is Right, and for competing on seasons 2 and 6 of The Celebrity Apprentice as well as the first season of Deal or No Deal Island. Jordan appeared on the Bravo reality television series The Real Housewives of Atlanta for its seventh season.

== Early life and beauty pageants ==
Jordan was born on April 12, 1973, in Providence, Rhode Island. Upon graduating from Baldwin Wallace University with a degree in broadcasting and journalism, Jordan competed in and won the Miss Rhode Island Teen USA beauty pageant in 1990, she then competed in Miss Teen USA 1990, but did not advance to the semifinals. In 1997, she was crowned Miss Rhode Island USA; that year, she made top ten in the Miss USA 1997 pageant, once again representing Rhode Island.

== Career ==
After beginning her career as an actress, with minor roles in That's So Raven and the 2002 film Simone, Jordan received greater notoriety when she began serving as one of Barker's Beauties on The Price Is Right (2001–2003) during the show's twenty-ninth through thirty-second seasons.

In 2009, Jordan appeared on the second season of The Celebrity Apprentice. In the series, celebrities raise money for a charity of their choice; Jordan selected the NAPSAC Foundation as her charity. She was later asked to return to compete on the All-Star version of The Celebrity Apprentice. She was then hired by Apprentice host Donald Trump to co-host the Miss Universe 2009 pageant from the Bahamas alongside Billy Bush.

Jordan's first hosting job was for Fox Sports West as a red-carpet correspondent for 54321 and also appeared on The Best Damn Sports Show Period. She then went on E! and The Style Network as the co-host of The Modern Girl's Guide to Life for two seasons. After that, she was asked to join BET's late night sports talk show Ballers with John Salley, Guy Torry and Hugh Douglas. Jordan was also a standout on the satellite radio show The Foxxhole alongside Jamie Foxx, who then gave her, her own weekly show on Sirius/XM Radio on The Foxxhole, called "The Claudia Jordan Show".

Jordan also co-hosted on "Reach Around Radio". Jordan was a co-host on Tameka Cottle's talk show Tiny's Tonight alongside Tamar Braxton and rapper Trina. The television pilot aired in December 2012 on VH1. Jordan also hosted a travel show for AT&T called The Summer of Adventure. In October 2014, it was announced that Jordan would be joining the cast of The Real Housewives of Atlanta as a main housewife for its seventh season while simultaneously working as a co-host on the nationally syndicated Rickey Smiley Morning Show. Jordan also often appears as a contributor on CNN and HLN. She went on to star in TV One's The Next 15 and lead her own morning show in Dallas, The Morning Rush, which was the top-rated R&B Morning show in Dallas. She currently hosts two talk shows on Fox Soul: Cocktails with Queens (co-starring Vivica A. Fox, Syleena Johnson, and LisaRaye McCoy) and Tea G-I-F (with Al Reynolds and Funky Dineva).

== Filmography ==
=== Film ===
Year	Title	Role	Notes
1999	Trippin'	-	
2000	Retiring Tatiana	Pretty Woman at Party	
2000	Little Richard	Sexy Lady	TV movie
2002	Simone	Simone Lookalike	
2004	Nora's Hair Salon	Dahlia	
2007	Black Supaman	Laura Lane	Video
2009	Middle Men	Cynthia	
2010	Anneo's Song	Sandy Danteria	Short
2012	Gang of Roses II: Next Generation	Mimi	
2014	Primal Instinct	Debbie Simmons	
2016	The Substitute Spy	Liz Strictland	
2017	The Hills	Nurse Brady	
2017	Sharknado 5: Global Swarming	Ursa	TV movie
2017	The Runner	Tahja Dupree	
2017	Jason's Letter	Mattie James	
2019	Dear Frank	Beth	
2019	Love Is Not Enough	Lisa Scarboro	
2022	Gutter	Dr. Frank	
2022	Why Women Trip	Demetria	
2022	10 Reasons Why Men Cheat	Dawn	
2023	Monogamish	Darlene	
2023	All I Want Is You	Chloe	
2023	All I Want Is You 2	Chloe	
2023	Miami Confidential	Selena Jackson	
2023	Mafietta 2: A House Divided	Clarke Williams	
2024	Trope	Shelly	
2024	Do It for the Gram	Megan	
2024	The Undeserving	Jessica Caldwell	
2024	Marriage Mansion	Francesca	
2025	The Handyman	Morgan	
2025	Run	Jennifer Jordan	
2025	Defamation	Gloria Rodriguez	
2025	Rent-A-Baeg	Claudia	
2025	The Exotic Life of Dr. Ollie	Faith	
2026	Rockabye	Gabriel	

=== Television ===
Year	Title	Role	Notes
1999	City Guys	Vanessa	Episode: "Movin' on Up"
2000	Jack & Jill	Natasha	Episode: "Lovers and Other Strangers"
2000–2003	The Price Is Right	Herself/Model	Cast Member: Season 29–32
2002	The Price Is Right Salutes	Herself/Model	Recurring Model
2003	Dog Eat Dog	Herself/Contestant	Episode: "August 5, 2003"
2003–2004	The Price Is Right Million Dollar Spectacular	Herself/Model	Recurring Model
2005	One on One	Herself	Episode: "Goodbye, Mr. Chips"
2005	That's So Raven	Miss Bonita	Episode: "They Work Hard for His Honey"
2005	Modern Girl's Guide to Life	Herself	Main Cast
2005–2009	Deal or No Deal	Herself/Briefcase #1	Cast Member: Seasons 1–4
2006	E! True Hollywood Story	Herself	Episode: "Sports Stars, Private Lives"
2009	Miss Universe 2009	Herself/Host	Main Host
2009	The Claudia Jordan Show and Friends	Herself/Host	Main Host
2009–2015	The Apprentice	Herself/Contestant	Contestant: Seasons 8 & 13, Guest: Season 14
2010	My Parents, My Sister & Me	Ms. Wilson/Angela	Episode: "Labor of Love" & "Puppy Love"
2010–2011	The Gossip Queens	Herself	Recurring Guest
2011	Reality Obsessed	Herself	Episode: "Quiz-Murtz"
2011	The Hot 10	Herself/Host	Main Host
2011–2013	Reach Around Radio	Herself/Host	Main Host
2012	Miss Universe 2012	Herself/Judge	Main Judge
2012–2013	Diary of a Champion	Tahja Dupree	Main Cast
2013	Life with La Toya	Herself	Episode: "La Toya Jackson, You're Fired"
2013	Buzz: AT&T Original Documentaries	Herself/Host	Main Host
2013	Tiny Tonight	Herself/Host	Main Host
2014	According to Him + Her	Herself/Host	Main Host
2014–2026	The Real Housewives of Atlanta	Herself	Main Cast: Season 7, Guest: Seasons 8, 13, 15 & 17
2015	Guy Theory	Tracey Monroe	Main Cast
2015	Married to Medicine	Herself	Episode: "Mariah the Party Crasher"
2015	Below Deck	Herself	Episode: "The Real Housewives of Atlanta"
2016	The Sin Within	Yolanda Barker	Main Cast
2016	The Next :15	Herself	Main Cast
2016	Chopped	Herself/Contestant	Episode: "Holiday Reality Check"
2017	NAFCA Annual Show	Herself/Host	Main Host
2017	In the Cut	Beautiful Woman	Episode: "Blood Pressure Is Thicker Than Water"
2017–2018	The Raw Word	Herself/Host	Main Host
2018	Cover Story	Herself	Episode: "Meghan Markle: The Prince and the Game Show Model"
2019	Out Loud with Claudia Jordan	Herself/Host	Main Host
2020	Love & Hip Hop: Miami	Herself/Host	Episode: "Reunion Part 1 & 2"
2020–2023	Cocktails with Queens	Herself/Co-Host	Main Co-Host
2020–2024	TEA G-I-F	Herself/Co-Host	Main Co-Host
2022	VH1 Couples Retreat	Herself	Main Cast
2023	Watch What Happens Live with Andy Cohen	Herself/Bartender	Episode: "Ce-LEE-brate Good Times!"
2023	The Game Show Show	Herself	Recurring Guest
2024	Deal or No Deal Island	Herself/Contestant	Main Cast
2024	College Hill: Celebrity Edition	Herself	Main Cast: Season 3
2025	Dish Nation	Herself/Guest Co-Host	Episode: "Episode #13.228" & #13.229"
2025	Secrets of Celebrity Sex Tapes	Herself	Recurring Guest
2026	Dirty Rotten Scandals	Herself	Episode: "The Price Is Right Pt. 2"

=== Music videos ===
Year	Song	Artist
1996	"Me and Those Dreamin' Eyes of Mine"	D'Angelo
1997	"Only When Ur Lonely"	Ginuwine
1997	"As Long as You Love Me"	Backstreet Boys
1997	"5 Steps"	Dru Hill
1998	"Late Nite Tip"	Three 6 Mafia
1999	"I Wanna Know"	Joe
2000	"Listen to Your Man"	Chico DeBarge featuring Joe
2004	"Splash Waterfalls"	Ludacris
2005	"Charlie, Last Name Wilson"	Charlie Wilson
2008	"Why Just Be Friends"	Joe
2009	"Throw It in the Bag"	Fabolous featuring The-Dream
2015	"Unnecessary Trouble"	Demetria McKinney featuring Kandi Burruss
2017	"Push"	Kenny Lattimore
2019	"Kiss Me Like You Love Me"	Benzino featuring Bobby V

=== Documentary ===
Year	Title	Role	Notes
2020	Trump vs Hollywood	Herself	

Preceded by Deb Hodges	Miss Rhode Island USA; 1990	Succeeded by Gina Tognoni
