= Iris 3000 Videophone =

SIP videophone manufactured by UMEC for ACN

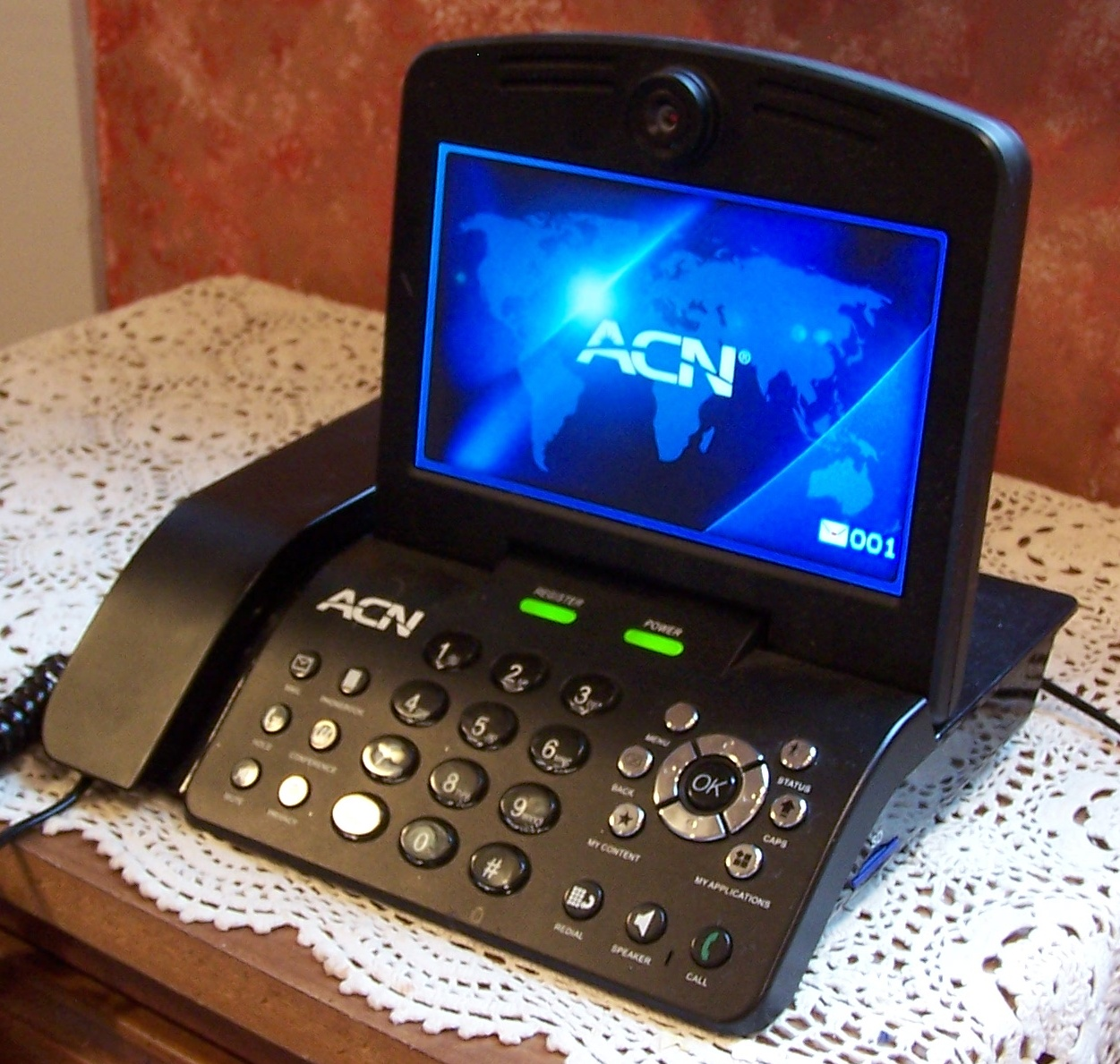
The Iris 3000 Videophone

The Iris 3000 is a SIP videophone manufactured by UMEC for ACN Inc. It features a 7-inch screen, CMOS Camera, an idle-time photo frame, and a standard phone jack to attach it to a cordless telephone for use throughout a home. It uses high-speed internet (DSL or cable) to connect with the service provider's network and thence to worldwide telephone systems.

== Features ==
The IRIS 3000 can be used as a digital photo Frame when not in use (a setup option), using either a USB thumb drive or SD memory card as the picture source, and includes a built-in phone adapter to connect an audio-only analog or digital phone for house-wide service. It also has audio and video output jacks (RCA) so that images from the video phone can be shown on a larger screen such as a computer or TV. The service provides for video greetings and video mail for others with Iris 2000 or 3000 videophones. The phone service also communicates with any other audio-only telephone, including voice greetings and voice mail.

== Specification ==
The phone is based on Freescale's i.MX27 ARM Board and runs a custom Linux kernel. It uses SIP for the connection of the call, supports codecs G.729 and G.711 for audio and H.263 and H.264 for video.

== Requirements ==
The phone requires a broadband internet connection (xDSL, Cable or Fiber) with at least 256 Kbs upload speed in order to function properly with a video call. It will not work on any speed of dialup. It could be configured to work with 3G or wifi connections, but such options are not officially supported by ACN yet.

== In popular culture ==
The Iris 3000 was featured in the fourth episode of Season 8 of Donald Trump's The Apprentice. The two competitor teams were set to the task of developing a publicity launch event for the videophone.

== Fraud lawsuit against Donald Trump ==
The videophones were sold by ACN Inc in a multi-level marketing pyramid scheme. In 2018 investors sued Donald Trump (Doe et al. v. Trump Corp. et al.) for fraud and for denying that he was a paid promoter of this get rich quick scheme. The trial was scheduled for January 29, 2024 in the Southern District of New York, but the Federal Court entered an order dismissing the lawsuit without prejudice on January 11, 2024. Many of the federal claims were dismissed, leaving state court claims and out-pocket damages of approximately $7,000.00. The Federal Court declined to exercise jurisdiction over those claims, and the plaintiffs intend to continue prosecution of their cases in the state courts of California, Maryland, and Pennsylvania, respectively.
