= The Apprentice (American TV series) season 8 =

The Apprentice
- Season 8
- No. of contestants: 16
- Winner: Joan Rivers
- Runner-up: Annie Duke
- No. of episodes: 11

Release
- Original network: NBC
- Original release: March 1 – May 10, 2009

Additional information
- Filming dates: October 2008 – November 2008

Season chronology
- ← Previous; Season 7 Next → Season 9

The Celebrity Apprentice 2 (also known as The Apprentice 8) is the eighth installment of the reality game show The Apprentice. It premiered on March 1, 2009. The Celebrity Apprentice 2 aired for two hours on Sundays at 9:00 Eastern time. Joan Rivers was the winner, while Annie Duke was the runner-up.

== Candidates ==
The following is the list of candidates for this season. The candidates are divided into two teams, male versus female (as in seasons 1, 2, and 4). The women named their team Athena, after the Greek goddess of wisdom, strategic warfare and heroic endeavor. The men named their team KOTU, an acronym for Kings Of The Universe.

Celebrity	Background	Original team	Age	Hometown	Charity	Result	Raised
Joan Rivers	Comedian & television host	Athena	75	Larchmont, New York	God's Love We Deliver	The Celebrity Apprentice (2009–05–10)	$526,546
Annie Duke	Professional poker player	Athena	43	Concord, New Hampshire	Refugees International	Fired in the Season Finale (2009–05–10)	$730,725
Jesse James	Television host & motor customizer	KOTU	39	Long Beach, California	Long Beach Education Foundation	Fired in task 12 (2009–05–03)	$20,000
Brande Roderick	Model & actress	Athena	34	Novato, California	California Police Youth Charities	Fired in task 12 (2009–05–03)	$166,450
Clint Black	Country singer	KOTU	47	Katy, Texas	International Rett Syndrome Foundation	Fired in task 11 (2009–05–03)	$20,000
Melissa Rivers	Television host	Athena	41	New York, New York	Lili Claire Foundation	Fired in task 10 (2009–04–26)	
Herschel Walker	Former NFL running back	KOTU	47	Wrightsville, Georgia	Alternative Community Development Services	Fired in task 9 (2009–04–19)	
Natalie Gulbis	LPGA golfer	Athena	26	Sacramento, California	Boys & Girls Clubs of America	Fired in task 8 (2009–04–19)	$20,000
Brian McKnight	Singer-songwriter	KOTU	39	Buffalo, New York	Youthville, USA	Fired in task 7 (2009–04–12)	$20,000
Khloe Kardashian	Reality television star	Athena	24	Los Angeles, California	The Brent Shapiro Foundation for Alcohol and Drug Awareness	Fired in task 6 (2009–04–05)	$40,000
Tionne "T-Boz" Watkins	TLC singer	Athena	38	Atlanta, Georgia	Sickle Cell Foundation of Georgia	Fired in task 6 (2009–04–05)	$20,000
Dennis Rodman	Former NBA power forward	KOTU	48	Dallas, Texas	Court Appointed Special Advocates	Fired in task 5 (2009–03–29)	
Claudia Jordan	Miss USA 1997 & Deal or No Deal model	Athena	35	Providence, Rhode Island	NAPSAC Foundation	Fired in task 4 (2009–03–22)	
Tom Green	Comedian	KOTU	37	Gloucester, Ontario	Butch Walts and Donald Skinner Urologic Cancer Research Foundation	Fired in task 3 (2009–03–15)	
Scott Hamilton	Former Olympic figure skater	KOTU	50	Bowling Green, Ohio	The Cleveland Clinic Foundation	Fired in task 2 (2009–03–08)	
Andrew Dice Clay	Stand-up comedian	KOTU	51	Brooklyn, New York	StandUp for Kids	Fired in task 1 (2009–03–01)	

== Weekly results ==
Candidate	Original team	Task 6 team	Task 7 team	Task 10 team	Final Task	Application result	Record as project manager
Joan Rivers	Athena	KOTU	KOTU	KOTU	KOTU	The Celebrity Apprentice	1–1 (win in task 1, loss in task 8)
Annie Duke	Athena	Athena	Athena	Athena	Athena	Fired in the season finale	2–0 (win in tasks 8 & 11)
Jesse James	KOTU	Athena	Athena	KOTU		Fired in task 12	1–0 (win in task 9)
Brande Roderick	Athena	Athena	Athena	Athena	Athena	Fired in task 12	1–1 (win in task 3, loss in task 10)
Clint Black	KOTU	KOTU	KOTU	KOTU	KOTU	Fired in task 11	1–2 (win in task 10, loss in tasks 6 & 11)
Melissa Rivers	Athena	Athena	Athena	Athena	KOTU	Fired in task 10	0–1 (loss in task 6)
Herschel Walker	KOTU	KOTU	KOTU		KOTU	Fired in task 9	0–2 (loss in tasks 1 & 9)
Natalie Gulbis	Athena	KOTU	KOTU			Fired in task 8	1–0 (win in task 7)
Brian McKnight	KOTU		Athena			Fired in task 7	1–1 (win in task 4, loss in task 7)
Khloé Kardashian	Athena	KOTU				Fired in task 6	1–0 (win in task 2)
Tionne "T-Boz" Watkins	Athena	Athena				Fired in task 6	1–0 (win in task 5)
Dennis Rodman	KOTU				Athena	Fired in task 5	0–1 (loss in task 5)
Claudia Jordan	Athena					Fired in task 4	0–1 (loss in task 4)
Tom Green	KOTU				Athena	Fired in task 3	0–1 (loss in task 3)
Scott Hamilton	KOTU					Fired in task 2	0–1 (loss in task 2)
Andrew Dice Clay	KOTU					Fired in task 1	

No.	Elimination chart													
No.	Candidate	1	2	3	4	5	6	7	8	9	10	11	12	13
1	Joan	WIN	IN	IN	IN	IN	IN	IN	LOSE	IN	IN	IN	IN	HIRED
2	Annie	IN	IN	IN	IN	IN	IN	IN	WIN	IN	BR	WIN	IN	FIRED
3	Jesse	IN	IN	IN	IN	IN	IN	IN	IN	WIN	IN	IN	FIRED	
4	Brande	IN	IN	WIN	IN	IN	BR	BR	IN	IN	LOSE	IN	FIRED	
5	Clint	IN	IN	IN	IN	IN	LOSE	IN	IN	IN	WIN	FIRED		
6	Melissa	IN	IN	IN	BR	IN	LOSE	BR	IN	IN	FIRED			
7	Herschel	LOSE	BR	IN	IN	IN	IN	IN	IN	FIRED				
8	Natalie	IN	IN	IN	IN	IN	BR	WIN	FIRED					
9	Brian	IN	IN	IN	WIN	IN	IN	FIRED						
10	Khloé	IN	WIN	IN	BR	IN	FIRED							
11	Tionne	IN	IN	IN	IN	WIN	FIRED							
12	Dennis	BR	IN	IN	IN	FIRED								
13	Claudia	IN	IN	IN	FIRED									
14	Tom	IN	BR	FIRED										
15	Scott	IN	FIRED											
16	Andrew	FIRED												

The candidate was on the losing team.
The candidate won the competition and was named the Celebrity Apprentice.
The candidate won as project manager on his/her team.
The candidate lost as project manager on his/her team.
The candidate was on the losing team and brought to the final boardroom.
The candidate was fired.
The candidate lost as project manager and was fired.
The candidate was absent during the week due to previous engagements.

== Episodes ==
=== Episode 1: Cupcake Contest ===
Task 1

- Airdate: March 1, 2009
- Task scope: The making and selling of homemade cupcakes at the Institute of Culinary Education and having them tested in a taste contest
- Athena project manager: Joan Rivers
- KOTU project manager: Herschel Walker
- Judges: Donald Trump; Ivanka Trump; Donald Trump Jr.
- Winning team: Athena
  - Reasons for win: All of the women managed to bring in at least one contact to raise money, with Brande Roderick and Annie Duke being the most successful in this regard. Representatives from Crumbs bakery sampled both Athena's chocolate ganache cupcake and KOTU's Vanilla cupcake. Athena won an extra $15,000 for having the better-tasting cupcake. This turned out to be the difference between winning and losing, as the men's team would have been at nearly $65,000 had they won this vote. Athena were also praised for bouncing back from an early disaster, caused when the chocolate cupcakes did not raise properly due to an incorrect mixing, which the team recovered from by adding extra chocolate topping. The team committed another blunder by giving one of these cupcakes to Crumbs instead of the more popular vanilla with chocolate chip cookies, but fortunately this turned out not to matter because KOTU's cupcake tasted far worse.
- Losing team: KOTU
  - Reasons for loss: Neither Andrew Dice Clay, Dennis Rodman nor Jesse James brought in a single donor between them, with Herschel Walker and Tom Green bringing in three-quarters of the team's revenue. Despite this, the team still earned enough that they could have edged the women by winning the $15,000 from Crumbs; unfortunately an earlier blunder cost them severely, as they did not add enough sugar to their cupcakes and had to resort to brushing syrup onto them. This did not make enough of a difference, and the representatives from Crumbs called the men's cupcake the most disgusting thing they had ever tasted, costing them the $15,000 and with it, the task.
  - Sent to boardroom: Andrew Dice Clay, Dennis Rodman, Herschel Walker
- Fired: Andrew Dice Clay – by process of elimination and for potentially implying at one point that he wanted to quit. While Dice said that he didn't intend to actually quit because he would be effectively admitting the loss was his fault, Trump became convinced that his heart wasn't in the competition. Even though Herschel was responsible for his bad leadership and baking a lousy cupcake, he did bring in much of the money, as well as fighting to stay along with Dennis, leaving Trump to eliminate Andrew Dice Clay. Dice was also fired for not contributing much on this task and for not bringing any donors in. Andrew also referred to Trump as "Donny Trump", which Trump took as a major sign of disrespect and was a big factor in choosing to let Andrew go.
- Notes:
  - Athena raised $76,267.39.
  - KOTU raised $49,449.
  - This is the fifth season that started the job interview process with teams of men vs. women
  - Andrew Dice Clay was the first candidate to express the urge to quit but not actually do so.
  - KOTU is the first corporate name that is an acronym—Kings Of The Universe
  - The total money of profit was $125,716.39, which is a Celebrity Apprentice record of winning money as project manager.
  - Claudia Jordan was very vocal about Annie Duke being too controlling—especially in making the cupcakes.
  - Members of KOTU didn't even like their own cupcakes with Clint Black saying it was a not sweet enough muffin Tom Green saying it was like perfume on a turd and Jesse James saying KOTU'S cupcake tasted like ass.

=== Episode 2: E instead of Z ===
Task 2

- Airdate: March 8, 2009
- Task sponsor: zappos.com
- Task scope: Creating a four-page comic book with a central comic book character represented by zappos.com.
- Athena project manager: Khloé Kardashian
- KOTU project manager: Scott Hamilton
- Judges: Donald Trump; Donald Trump Jr.; Erin Burnett
- Winning team: Athena
  - Reasons for win: Although Claudia Jordan fumbled the presentation and Natalie Gublis did not do her team any favors by saying she wanted to get out of the costume, the CEO of Zappos generally liked their comic more than KOTU's.
- Losing team: KOTU
  - Reasons for loss: The CEO of Zappos said he was impressed by both teams. However, while Tom Green's presentation appeared stronger, the CEO couldn't quite understand why the character was named EEE (Scott's name that Tom fought against). This was ultimately the deciding factor.
  - Sent to boardroom: Scott Hamilton, Tom Green, Herschel Walker.
- Fired: Scott Hamilton – for giving the comic book character a name that did not start with a Z, for not controlling the strong personalities on his team, and for bringing Herschel Walker instead of Clint Black.
- Notes:
  - When Donald Trump Jr. came to check on Athena's progress, Melissa Rivers took all the credit for the name of Athena's comic book character and the concept of their comic, even though Claudia Jordan was the one who came up with the concept and Joan Rivers was the one who came up with the name. When it was brought up in the boardroom, Khloé Kardashian confirmed that the ideas stemmed from Claudia, but did not contradict Melissa's claim.
  - Claudia fell ill later into the day and asked to go home from the task, despite being the one who was presenting the comic in front of the CEO. She also claimed in the boardroom that it was the team that made her go home. This also affected Claudia's presentation that morning, but the women won nonetheless.
  - Annie Duke was angered that Claudia left for the night because she had such a pivotal role in the task. Annie also wanted to write the script of the comic instead of Joan Rivers (an accomplished writer), which infuriated Joan.
  - When Claudia fumbled Athena's presentation, she thought she would grade herself a "2.0" or "C".
  - Dennis Rodman wanted to make KOTU's comic book character a transvestite.
  - Khloé gradually stepped into her role as project manager after several hours of people talking over each other. However, the consensus among her team was that she did quite well, even though it was acknowledged that she was famous for virtually nothing.
  - Khloé won $20,000 to her charity.
  - The men took much longer than the women to come up with a concept. A feud erupted between Tom Green and Scott Hamilton during the task, after Scott thought that Tom was being distracting and Tom thought that no one was listening to any of his ideas. Herschel Walker told Tom to shut up numerous times, and Herschel was even brought into the boardroom to solely advocate against Tom.
  - Originally, Scott considered bring back only Tom, but decided to bring back Tom and Herschel after mentioning the events that happened last season with Gene Simmons. Herschel was then sent out before Trump fired Scott.
  - Clint Black was frustrated with the lack of work being done and tried to take charge. Several celebrities commented about his demeanor and said it looked like he thought he was project manager. Jesse James also commented on how demanding and obnoxious Clint was and said that if he was Trump, he would fire Clint.
  - Clint also had many tense exchanges of words with Dennis, which would come to a head in the fourth episode.
  - Natalie Gulbis had to wear her team's costume, and then made a negative comment about the costume in front of the Zappos executive, which she was criticized for by Donald Trump Jr.
  - Although the episode made it look like KOTU lost purely because their character's name started with an E instead of a Z, the show's website revealed that the Zappos CEO, Tony Hsieh, had another problem with the fact that their name was very similar to the Asus Eee PC and potentially a violation of the Asus trademark.

=== Episode 3: Drink, Deliver and Decorate ===
Task 3

- Air date: March 15, 2009
- Task scope: Sell 125 wedding dresses.
- Athena project manager: Brande Roderick
- KOTU project manager: Tom Green
- Judges: Donald Trump; Ivanka Trump; George H. Ross
- Winning team: Athena
  - Reasons for win: Many of Athena's contacts came through, with Brande Roderick and Annie Duke once again bringing in huge amounts of money. In addition, their wonderfully decorated space was inviting to the non-contact buyers.
- Losing team: KOTU
  - Reasons for loss: Already two people down, KOTU lost another person when Dennis Rodman didn't participate due to getting sick the night before. Prior to Dennis' alleged illness, he did nothing to help his team, and appeared more interested in bar hopping than in his self-appointed task of promoting the sale. Only part of the $45,000 and $35,000 that Clint Black and Herschel Walker, respectively, raised through contacts showed up in time to count for final sales, while Tom Green and Jesse James didn't bring in any money at all (though Dennis actually did, as his agent showed up and paid $3,000 for a dress). Also, Tom insisted on a minimalist decoration which did not appeal to the buyers. George was appalled at the decoration choice and angrily asked Tom "Who was your interior decorator Stevie Wonder?"
  - Sent to boardroom: No final boardroom – Trump was so enraged about Tom's performance on the last two tasks, and more so the fact that he apparently lied to Trump and George Ross about Dennis's reasons for not taking part in the second day in the task, that he fired Tom on the spot without the need for a Final Boardroom. Also, Trump felt that Tom should have been fired the previous week because he didn't get along with his team, this week he was worse, and Scott Hamilton could have stayed a little longer.
- Fired: Tom Green – for showing lousy leadership by sleeping in, not bringing any money, unable to get along and work with his teammates throughout the interview process, getting Dennis Rodman drunk behind the scenes (which upset Trump as he was very protective of Dennis' sobriety), and for his terrible contributions in the last two tasks. After Tom's Firing, Trump angrily demanded everyone to leave the boardroom.
- Notes:
  - Athena sold 22 dresses and total profit of $103,000.
  - KOTU sold 21 dresses and total profit of $63,450.
  - Brande Roderick won $166,450 for her charity, a record for most money won in a single task. It eclipsed Joan Rivers' record just two episodes ago.
  - Joan Rivers did not participate in the first day of this task due to a speaking engagement.
  - Brande Roderick considered Annie Duke and Melissa Rivers to be stars on her team.
  - During the task, Tom Green slept in while the rest of the team went to setup. Enraged, Jesse furiously called him and he was very late and very drunk.
  - During the Boardroom, Dennis Rodman insisted that he refused to help KOTU with the selling because of an allergic reaction to a cat. However, many teammates from both sides (especially based on comments by the women on Athena) speculated that it was a hoax, jokingly saying that the cat might have been a lady named "Kitty" that Dennis met earlier in the day, and his sickness was really a hangover. Notably, Dennis and Tom Green could not keep their story straight in the boardroom, variously claiming that Dennis had suffered an allergy to a cat or a dog.
  - From the KOTU teammates, Jesse James thought that Trump should fire both Tom and Dennis, and Herschel Walker and Clint Black agreed. Only Brian McKnight said just Tom. Dennis was likely spared because of Brian's statement, plus the fact he brought in money while Tom did not.
  - Mr. Trump said that Dennis should try a little harder and not keep losing.

=== Episode 4: Failure to Negotiate ===
Task 4

- Airdate: March 22, 2009
- Task sponsor: ACN Inc.
- Task scope: Both teams must produce a live event launching ACN's new Iris 3000 Videophone.
- Athena project manager: Claudia Jordan
- KOTU project manager: Brian McKnight
- Judges: Donald Trump; Ivanka Trump; Donald Trump Jr.
- Winning team: KOTU
  - Reasons for win: The audience at the presentations submitted comment cards regarding the presentations and selected their favorite. Despite comments regarding their lack of focus on the product, KOTU received 85% of the votes.
- Losing team: Athena
  - Reasons for loss: Athena's presentation only received 15% of the audience's votes. Despite praise for the comedic talents of Joan Rivers, the rest of the content of the presentation was judged to be inferior to that of KOTU's and the vignettes were extremely "cheesy" according to Donald Trump.
  - Sent to boardroom: Claudia Jordan, Melissa Rivers, Khloé Kardashian
- Fired: Claudia Jordan – for producing an uninteresting presentation, losing the respect of the entire team, and for letting her emotions tie into her decision to bring in Melissa Rivers.
- Notes:
  - Brian McKnight won $20,000 for his charity.
  - Joan Rivers again missed the early part of the task due to a charity event, and originally she was going to miss the entire task because of a late flight back to New York City. However, Natalie Gulbis researched an earlier flight and Joan managed to perform for Athena.
  - Claudia Jordan said that Melissa Rivers was very obnoxious and was her biggest problem. Despite that, the rest of the team said that Melissa did an outstanding job and even Annie Duke said if they won, she would have given all the credit to Melissa and Joan Rivers. Claudia still went on to say how bossy she was and how she cannot take criticism which infuriated Joan Rivers. Claudia was then getting verbally assaulted by Joan and Melissa, and the rest of the team believed that Claudia should get fired.
  - While Claudia actually said that Khloé Kardashian should be fired due to her lack of contribution to the task, she spent most of the boardroom attacking Melissa instead, which blew up in her face when Trump realised she had brought Melissa back in for personal reasons. Only then did Claudia attempt to make a case for Khloé to be fired, but Melissa came to her defense and blamed Claudia for not properly delegating.
  - This was the first time KOTU won a task.
  - After Clint Black won the right to have KOTU take the second presentation slot, Dennis Rodman suddenly sparked a massive argument with him (which the women reenacted in front of Don Jr.), apparently taking offense at the fact that Clint had won his team's presentation slot via a coin flip (even though the coin flip idea was actually from Annie Duke) before storming out and not returning until several hours later. After that, Brian McKnight barred Dennis from taking any further part in the task, even turning down an offer to secure audiovisual equipment for the presentation.

=== Episode 5: Leading the Regency ===
Task 5

- Airdate: March 29, 2009
- Task sponsor: Loews Hotels
- Task scope: Both teams must work as hoteliers at The Regency, A Loews Hotel in New York City.
- Athena project manager: Tionne "T-Boz" Watkins
- KOTU project manager: Dennis Rodman
- Dramatic Tension: After Dennis Rodman disappeared, Clint Black acted as the men's de facto project manager for the remainder of the task. He refused to actually take on the project manager's role however, out of concern that, were they to lose, Trump could fire Dennis for abandoning the team, and then judge the rest of the loss to be Clint's fault and fire him as well.
- Judges: Donald Trump; John Tisch; Ivanka Trump
- Winning team: Athena
  - Reasons for win: While Athena failed to mention the various prices for amenities to the guests, they made up with great customer service to score 91% for the customer approval rating.
- Losing team: KOTU
  - Reasons for loss: While Dennis Rodman was initially strong as project manager, he started drinking partway through the day and soon started behaving very erratically, leaving the check-in and room service in total chaos at the start of the task. The team pulled together with Clint Black leading the team for the remainder of the task and performed well after Dennis disappeared halfway through the task, but their weak start and the women's exceptional performance meant that they never had any realistic chance of victory. KOTU only received a score of 86%.
  - Sent to boardroom: No Boardroom Sessions. - Trump proceeded to the firing immediately after announcing Athena's victory. Dennis Rodman was confronted in the boardroom by Trump and the KOTU teammates as they were all concerned over his drinking.
- Fired: Dennis Rodman – for his erratic behavior over the last few weeks, the lack of leadership, allowing Clint to lead the men over him after Dennis started drinking during the task and disappearing afterwards, and for his alcoholism.
- Notes:
  - Tionne "T-Boz" Watkins won $20,000 for her charity.
  - Khloé Kardashian missed the first day of the task due to a prior engagement. As a result, she was visibly disorganised on the second day, and Tionne "T-Boz" Watkins said that if Athena lost, she would definitely bring back Khloé.
  - Vincent Pastore and Stephen Baldwin arrived as celebrity guests. Stephen Baldwin was disappointed with his room's view and Joan Rivers's oversight of not telling him the $400 in charges to see a show. Stephen and Vincent's experiences were not taken into account for the team's scores, much to Joan's relief and KOTU's disappointment, since Vincent had been very pleased with the service they gave him.
  - Room 702 and the clients requested Annie Duke for room service rather than Natalie Gulbis. Natalie had a hard time doing the room service and she rolled her eyes in front of Room 702.
  - At one point before the announcement of who won, Trump said that he could have fired Dennis even if Athena lost, which could have been an Apprentice show first.
  - Despite Athena's victory, the women's celebrations on the announcement of the result were very subdued. In particular, Annie Duke and Jesse James were visibly in tears when Dennis Rodman was fired.
  - At the end of the episode there was no shot of the other candidates returning to the suite, nor a trailer for the following episode. The credits ran over a black background, and were followed by a PSA for Alcoholics Anonymous.

=== Episode 6: Shuffle Up ===
Task 6

- Airdate: April 5, 2009
- Task scope: Both teams must create and present viral videos for All laundry detergent.
- Corporate Reshuffle: Because KOTU is grievously decimated, Trump decided to reshuffle the teams. The new KOTU consists of Khloé, Natalie, Clint, Joan, and Herschel. The new Athena contains Jesse, Melissa, Annie, Tionne, and Brande.
- Athena project manager: Melissa Rivers
- KOTU project manager: Clint Black
- Judges: Donald Trump; Donald Trump Jr.; Ivanka Trump
- Winning team: No winning team – despite the All executives making it clear that they wanted videos that were humorous, but also conservative and family-friendly, both teams produced videos containing distinctly adult themes, and various other flaws. As a result, All rejected both videos, meaning that both teams lost the task, and both teams came back to the final boardroom.
- Losing team: Athena & KOTU
  - Athena's reason for loss: Although Athena did a better job of explaining the All detergent, and their video was preferred by Perez Hilton, executives did not like the fact that they used the politically incorrect term "midget" in their video, in addition to other foul language. Also, Trump wasn't sure that using Jesse James was the best focal point for the detergent's target demographic.
  - Sent to boardroom (Athena): Melissa Rivers, Brande Roderick, Tionne "T-Boz" Watkins
  - KOTU's reason for loss: KOTU lost because their commercial did not even explain how the detergent worked. The commercial also featured off-color sexual innuendo that Trump even compared to porn.
  - Sent to boardroom (KOTU): Clint Black, Natalie Gulbis, Khloé Kardashian
- Fired: Tionne "T-Boz" Watkins and Khloe Kardashian for the following reasons:
  - Tionne "T-Boz" Watkins – for volunteering to go back to the boardroom. Trump even recalled a situation in the second season, when candidate Bradford Cohen agreed to waive his exemption, essentially agreeing to volunteer being up for termination. When Melissa Rivers came to her defense, Trump said that she would have been the one fired had Tionne not volunteered, and exclaimed "Never Volunteer for an Execution!"
  - Khloé Kardashian – for her past DUI arrest and for not letting Mr. Trump know about this. Trump also stated that Khloé lied about where she was the previous week.
- Notes:
  - Because KOTU is grievously decimated, Trump decided to reshuffle the teams. The new KOTU consists of Khloé, Natalie, Clint, Joan, and Herschel. The new Athena contains Jesse, Melissa, Annie, Tionne, and Brande.
  - Trump stressed to the remaining celebrities that alcohol abuse is a horrible thing and that he cannot stand it.
  - Before the task begin, Melissa stated the fact that at the Lowes Regency from Task 5, she tripped and tore a ligament from her leg.
  - Herschel Walker had a prior engagement and did not help out during the first day of the task except over the phone. Brian McKnight also had a prior engagement that day, but unlike Herschel Walker, he was unable to participate in the task at all. Brian would later be put on Athena.
  - An 'All' Detergent executive described All's demographic was "women with children", but then emphasized "not moms".
  - This is the second time in Apprentice history where both teams lost and that both failing project managers picked two people to be brought in the boardroom. The first time this happened was in the third season, but unlike that season, Trump decided to fire two people, and one from each team.
  - Khloé Kardashian was fired because of her previous arrest for a DUI. However, Trump did give her $20,000 for her charity—bringing her total to $40,000.
  - Although they had constantly butted heads, Clint Black chose not to bring Joan Rivers back into the boardroom, despite saying earlier in the episode that Joan would be the only person he would bring back. By his own admission, Clint had intended to engineer his own termination by bringing back Khloé Kardashian and Natalie Gulbis, who were not to blame for the loss. However, Clint's plan backfired after Trump proceeded to fire Khloé for something unrelated to the task.
  - At the end of the episode during the final commercial break, it was revealed that Joan and Melissa Rivers had both starred in a series of viral videos for All detergent, which were available on the company website.

=== Episode 7: Protect the Conflict ===
Task 7

- Airdate: April 12, 2009
- Task sponsor: LifeLock
- Task scope: Both teams must design in-store displays for an identity-theft protection company.
- Athena project manager: Brian McKnight
- KOTU project manager: Natalie Gulbis
- Judges: Donald Trump; George H. Ross; Ivanka Trump
- Winning team: KOTU
- Reason for win: KOTU had the more interesting display and product packaging. Executives also liked the idea of having the celebrities endorsing their product.
- Losing team: Athena
- Reason for loss: While Athena had a better presentation, their packaging looked cheap and they did not introduce anything new to the display.
- Sent to the boardroom: Brian McKnight, Melissa Rivers, Brande Roderick
- Fired: Brian McKnight – for letting another teammate, Annie Duke, take the reins during the task and for admitting that he had lost his desire to continue in the process.
- Notes:
  - At the beginning of the episode, most of the celebrities were shocked when Khloé Kardashian was fired simply because of her past DUI arrest. Trump assured the teams that because she lied about it she was fired, plus after what happened with Dennis Rodman two weeks ago, Trump wasn't going to take any more chances.
  - For this task, Brian McKnight was placed on the Athena team.
  - Natalie Gulbis won $20,000 for her charity.
  - Despite a personality conflict with Clint Black during the last task, Joan Rivers was able to work with Clint and her opinion of him improves. Joan and Melissa Rivers both switch their ire to Annie Duke, with whom they have discussed fellow team members.
  - Joan Rivers continues her extreme protection of Melissa Rivers, including threatening to quit the show if Melissa is fired. Clint Black asked Joan what she would do if she and Melissa ended up facing off against each other in the final, but Joan refused to answer the question.
  - Jesse James became increasingly ill with a stomach flu throughout the episode.
  - The second half of this episode featured the beginnings of the next task, which was completed in Episode 8. Piers Morgan, the winner of the first Celebrity Apprentice competition was introduced as a surprise guest observer of the subsequent task.
  - There were many personality conflicts between Joan Rivers and Annie Duke, along with Melissa Rivers' attitude among others.
  - Trump lets the celebrities know that he hates people who choose to drink and drive. This primarily explains his firing of Khloé.

=== Episode 8: Sold Food ===
Task 8

- Airdate: April 19, 2009
- Task scope: Raise the most money by auctioning jewelry from Ivanka Trump's jewelry brand.
- Athena project manager: Annie Duke
- KOTU project manager: Joan Rivers
- Judges: Donald Trump; Ivanka Trump; Piers Morgan
- Winning team: Athena
  - Reasons for win: The team raised $153,000. Annie Duke proved an extremely effective auctioneer, getting huge bids for their items, and Brande Roderick was able to bring in some very wealthy contacts. Melissa Rivers' jewelry choices also proved good, as they were large and visible throughout the room.
- Losing team: KOTU
  - Reasons for loss: The team raised $92,000, mostly through one piece of jewelry. The team struggled to bring in contacts, however, and had to have two of them club together for their largest sale (their second-largest sale in fact ended up being to a donor brought in by Brande Roderick for the other team). Clint Black proved a terrible auctioneer, failing to create any atmosphere within the room and getting the jewelry items mixed up, and did so poorly that Joan Rivers had to jump in mid-auction and take over. Natalie Gulbis also selected jewelry that was far too small to be seen from the far sides of the room.
- Sent to the boardroom: No final boardroom – Trump felt that he could not fire Herschel Walker (who brought in over half the team's revenue), and that Joan Rivers was still the strongest member of her team. This left it between Clint Black and Natalie Gulbis, and despite Clint's awful performance as the auctioneer, Trump felt that Natalie's jewelry choices had doomed the team from the start, and her failure to bring in any money whatsoever sealed her fate.
- Fired: Natalie Gulbis – for not being an effective fundraiser for Ivanka Trump's jewelry brand, primarily by selecting jewelry that was too small to be visible in the room.
- Notes:
  - The first half of this task was shown during the previous episode.
  - Immediately after Melissa Rivers and Brande Roderick returned from the previous task's boardroom, Trump asked all the candidates to return to the boardroom so that he could give them the task briefing. He also asked them to select their project managers there and then; Herschel Walker initially stepped up as KOTU's project manager, but in an unusual move Trump actually overrode the team and selected Joan Rivers to be their project manager, feeling that she would be a better leader for this sort of task than Herschel.
  - The previous Celebrity Apprentice, Piers Morgan, was brought back to observe the teams as a judge.
  - Trump commented that having very small jewelry confused some viewers in the back row, for they could not see the items up for auction. He also commented that having very small jewelry was also somewhat offensive to his daughter Ivanka.
  - Jesse James again failed to bring in any donors at all, which led Piers to question his claims that despite being married to Sandra Bullock he hadn't made any contacts within the film industry. Trump was unimpressed by Jesse's excuses, and made it clear that had Athena lost, Jesse would absolutely have been fired.
  - A feud breaks out between Annie Duke and Joan Rivers, and Joan even goes as far as to compare Annie to Adolf Hitler. Piers commented in the boardroom that Annie and Joan's feud made the previous season's feud between him and Omarosa look like a tea party. Melissa actually sided against Annie in the argument, and while Trump said that he would normally find backing up the opposing project manager to be an act of extreme disloyalty, he could understand it given Joan and Melissa's very close mother-daughter relationship.
  - Annie Duke's earnings of $245,000 is a record for The Celebrity Apprentice.

Task 9

- Task sponsor: The Schwan Food Company
- Task scope: Create a new meal for Schwan's LiveSmart frozen food line.
- Athena project manager: Jesse James
- KOTU project manager: Herschel Walker
- Judges: Donald Trump; Ivanka Trump; Joe Kernen
- Winning team: Athena
- Reasons for victory: Despite not having a marketing plan, their turkey meatball with gluten-free pasta meal was far more innovative than the ones created by KOTU.
- Losing team: KOTU
- Reasons for loss: The executives felt that while their soy ginger and orange chicken meal tasted good, the frozen yogurt dessert was too complex to be packaged as a frozen food.
- Sent to the boardroom: No final boardroom – Trump held Herschel primarily responsible for the loss, and given Clint and Joan's superior performances compared to his, Trump had enough evidence to fire him without a final boardroom.
- Fired: Herschel Walker – For choosing an unsuitable dessert and for losing control of Clint Black, even though Clint is not easy and never listens to his team. Herschel also had a bad record as project manager (0–2), and for his excessive losses in the tasks (2–7).
- Notes:
  - Jesse James won $20,000 for his charity.

=== Episode 9: Right Guard, Right Way out ===
Task 10

- Airdate: April 26, 2009
- Task scope: Create a 4-page advertorial, starring David Lee, for Right Guard deodorant
- Athena project manager: Brande Roderick
- KOTU project manager: Clint Black
- Judges: Donald Trump; Ivanka Trump; Jim Cramer
- Winning team: KOTU
  - Reasons for win: Their advertorial had great branding and used the orange color-key trademark. David Lee was well integrated, and the team ran the power stripe idea around the border.
- Losing team: Athena
  - Reasons for loss: They missed the order, having David Lee and the ball buried on the third page of the spread.
- Sent to the boardroom: Brande Roderick, Annie Duke, Melissa Rivers
- Boardroom tension: Roderick was highly criticized by Jim Cramer in the boardroom for being not effective as a leader and questioning that if she thinks of herself as a strong player which led her to being extremely defensive and eventually changing his mind of firing her over Melissa Rivers.
- Fired: Melissa Rivers – As Trump considered all three responsible for the loss, Melissa was fired mainly for raising less money when compared to Annie and Brande, and for not defending herself as effectively as Brande.
- Notes:
  - To even the teams, Jesse James was sent back to KOTU.
  - Jesse declined to cooperate with Clint Black on the project, after the better part of Jesse's ideas were not used. Clint and Joan Rivers understood, and even Jesse acknowledged Clint as a good project leader and congratulated him on the winning ad campaign.
  - Melissa Rivers asked Annie and Brande for more involvement in the task, but they refused, and then complained in the boardroom that Melissa didn't do a lot.
  - Melissa Rivers accused Annie Duke and Brande Roderick of conspiring against her because they had left her out of participating in the team project, an accusation that both Annie and Brande denied, despite such conspiracies being caught on tape, and airing on the show.
  - After being fired, Melissa completely lost control and she verbally attacked her teammates, calling them "whore pit vipers" and then refused to do an exit interview, hurling abuse at the show's behind-the-scenes staff in the process.
  - Joan called Annie a Nazi and a "piece of shit" after Melissa was fired, straight after calling Brandie a “stupid blonde”. She said (to Brandie), “you have been so manipulated, so manipulated, she is gonna knock you off (referring to Annie), do you think you’re gonna win? You are NOT gonna win, I don’t wanna hear it, you’re not gonna win”. She then turned on Annie, stating “And YOUR people, you give money with blood on it. I met your people in Vegas for forty years, none of them had last names, NONE of them” before screaming “you’re a POKER player, a POKER player. That’s beyond white trash!”. Joan then exited Trump Tower with Melissa saying "I don't work with scum".
  - Clint Black won $20,000 for his charity.

=== Episode 10: Catchy, not Country ===
Task 11

- Airdate: May 3, 2009
- Task scope: Create a jingle and 30-second commercial for Chicken of the Sea.
- Athena project manager: Annie Duke
- KOTU project manager: Clint Black
- Judges: Donald Trump; Donald Trump Jr.; Ivanka Trump
- Winning team: Athena
- Reason for win: Despite not having a musical artist in their group, Athena managed to create a catchy jingle. They also made sure the commercial stresses what the Chicken of the Sea executives wanted to convey to consumers.
- Losing team: KOTU
- Reason for loss: Clint Black wrote and performed their song in country music style. Although executives liked the jingle, they felt that country music may not appeal to a broader audience.
- Sent to the boardroom: Jesse James, Joan Rivers, Clint Black
- Fired: Clint Black – for choosing a music genre that didn't have wide appeal, having a consistently abrasive attitude, and for his poor performances in previous tasks. Despite the fact that both teams did well, Clint was held responsible for the loss, and this also wasn't his first loss as project manager.
- Notes:
  - Despite her confrontational outburst and leaving with her daughter Melissa, Joan Rivers returned the next day for this task.
  - Annie Duke got another donation of $20,000, raising a total of $265,000.

Task 12

- Airdate: May 3, 2009
- Task scope: Individual interviews with Piers Morgan, who will advise Donald Trump on who should advance to the final two.
- Final four: Jesse James, Joan Rivers, Annie Duke, Brande Roderick
- Fired:
  - Brande Roderick – for not having what it took to be the Celebrity Apprentice. Trump said after firing her that she should be very proud of herself for how far she made it and how much money she raised and the job she did. Some people also felt that she relied too much on Annie in past tasks.
  - Jesse James – for holding back with his contacts and not bringing any big donors from the Cupcake task, Wedding task, and the Ivanka's jewelry brand task. Despite complimenting him on his overall good performance on the show, Trump said that it was ultimately all about raising money for charity, and that in that regard Jesse had in fact been the least effective person in the entire season.
- Notes:
  - Jesse's firing marks the end of the original KOTU members, meaning that for the third consecutive season, and fourth overall to this point, the final two are members from the same original team.
  - Jesse's firing also creates the second (and last) ever all-female final two, first occurring in the third season. An interesting note is that in both season 3 and 8 both teams lost the same task at one point in the season.
  - Another interesting note is that in season 3 and season 8 one of the teams, in this case KOTU never won two tasks in a row. In season 3 Net Worth never won two tasks in a row.
  - Piers recommended Annie and Joan as the final two because he felt Annie was the toughest and also because she raised the most money throughout the season. Even though his interview with Joan got a bit heated at times, he felt she had enough to make it to the final 2 and beat Annie.
  - Shortly before the end of the boardroom, Trump requested to know why Jesse had never asked his wife, Sandra Bullock, for any donations, adding that just one donation from her could potentially have swung any of the tasks he had lost. Jesse replied that he had promised Bullock that he would only ask her for a donation if he reached the final, but Trump considered this to be a sign of weakness and/or bad judgement, either of which he thought was more than sufficient to justify Jesse's firing.

=== Episode 11: Winning, or not ===
Task 13

- Airdate: May 10, 2009
- Task scope: The final two contestants must each sell tickets to a performance of the Cirque du Soleil show Wintuk and create and manage a party to entertain VIP guests before the show. The event must also include a silent auction of items collected by the teams for the auction and showcase the Kodak EasyShare digital frame.
- Annie's team: Brande Roderick, Dennis Rodman, Tom Green
- Joan's team: Herschel Walker, Clint Black, Melissa Rivers
- Fired: Annie Duke – For being deemed to have the less effective event between her and Joan Rivers. Additionally, Trump felt that Annie had been a little too much of a "one trick pony" during the season and had been too reliant on being able to call in fellow poker players for huge donations.
- Celebrity Apprentice: Joan Rivers – Despite raising less money than Annie Duke overall even after the final prize was awarded, Trump and the executives considered her event to be the better one, and Trump also felt that she had been exceptionally strong and resilient throughout the season and had demonstrated a broader skill set compared to Annie.
- Notes:
  - The live finale was broadcast from the American Museum of Natural History in New York City.
  - Joan Rivers' team raised $150,830, while Annie Duke's team raised $465,725.
  - Annie won 2 of 5 factors: money raised, and charity integration; Joan won 3 of 5 factors: Kodak branding, celebrity integration, and overall guest experience.
  - Joan Rivers was praised for her stamina, vitality, and tenacity as a 75-year-old woman.
  - Annie Duke was given credit for her intelligence, professionalism, ruthlessness, game strategy, and overall effectiveness of performance throughout the season.
  - Khloé Kardashian, Natalie Gulbis, and Tionne "T-Boz" Watkins were not present for the live reunion portion of the show.
  - Piers Morgan and Trace Adkins were present for the live reunion portion of the show.
  - Event planner David Tutera was originally chosen to assist Joan Rivers with her event planning, but quit before the event took place, reportedly being so upset, he quit both teams.
  - Joan Rivers, who had lost as project manager on the eight task, became the first contestant to be selected as the Apprentice over a finalist who did not lose a task as project manager. Another interesting note is that Annie Duke was the winning project manager on the eight task, but would go on to be defeated by Joan. Annie had also raised more money than Joan in the final task and in the overall season, but was still fired over Joan; mainly because (as Piers Morgan suggested) Annie only won two of the five requirements to win the final task, while Joan won three.
  - This is the only final task in Apprentice history that had a set of requirements spelled out with the winner decided by who did better in more categories.
  - Joan Rivers' track record was 6–5 with a 1–1 record as project manager. Annie Duke, on the other hand, was 7–4 and 2–0 as project manager. Despite Annie's slightly better track record, Joan was chosen the Celebrity Apprentice, because Annie lost the final task which ultimately determined who was going to be the Celebrity Apprentice.
  - If Annie Duke won she would have donated the most money to charity beating reigning champion Piers Morgan.

== Future involvement ==
Brande Roderick, Dennis Rodman, and Claudia Jordan all returned for All-Star Celebrity Apprentice. Roderick, Rodman, and Jordan placed 7th, 9th, and 11th, respectively, with Rodman and Jordan unable to raise anything and Roderick able to raise $20,000.
