= This Is Not a Test (2008 film) =

- Theatrical release poster
- Directed by: Chris Angel
- Written by: Chris Angel
- Produced by: Chris Angel; Hill Harper; Eric Hayes
- Starring: Hill Harper; Robinne Lee; Tom Arnold
- Cinematography: Charles Swanson
- Music by: Alan Ari Lazar
- Distributed by: Image Entertainment
- Release date: June 6, 2008
- Running time: 89 minutes
- Country: United States
- Language: English

This Is Not a Test is a 2008 American comedy-drama film co-produced, written and directed by Chris Angel and starring Hill Harper, Robinne Lee, and Tom Arnold. It was filmed in Los Angeles, California. The film was released on DVD in the United States on January 20, 2009.

== Plot ==
The film is based around a teacher named Carl (Hill Harper) who's living his everyday life while trying to cope with his fear of terrorist nuclear attacks. However, with the threat so high he soon lets loose and jeopardizes his family and friends.

This fear begins when he hears constant talk of terrorism on the news. He soon begins to have nightmares about himself and his family dying as a result of a nuclear terrorist attack. He searches on the internet for "how to protect your family from a terrorist attack". He ends up at a seminar he finds on a website that specializes in providing people with steps to prepare for an attack. There, he meets comedian Tom Arnold, who is also having fears of an attack. He and Arnold end up forming a close relationship later in the film.

Carl begins to clean out his basement and convert it into a fallout shelter. He fills it with emergency supply items (duct tape, food, water, flashlights, batteries, an EMP-proof radio, etc.). This worries his wife Viv, who is pregnant. She sends him to a therapist, whom Carl dislikes. Viv is even more worried when Tom takes Carl out to the shooting range at a gun shop, where Carl buys a 9mm Glock pistol. He places it and some gold he buys in a safe, which is delivered by three shady-looking characters. The gold, safe, and gun are lost when the same guys who delivered the safe, rob Carl and tie him and Viv up in the shelter.

During a scene when Carl is scanning his shelter for radiation, he sees a high radiation count in a plate he obtained from a homeless man earlier in the film. He returns the plate to him, however the man does not believe him and gives him a card to a mental health clinic. In one scene, Carl goes to a comedy club where Tom is performing, and hears Tom joking about him. He feels betrayed, and avoids contact with Tom.

Carl soon begins to believe that America is a dangerous place, and he searches for a home in British Columbia. This leads to Viv and him being separated. Carl buys the new house and says goodbye to his wife when she is heading to work. Just as Carl is packing, Tom calls him, and apologizes for his stage performance. He then tells Carl that one of his friends deep in the government reported that bomb disposal units have been dispatched to downtown L.A., where an armed suitcase nuke had been found. Tom has saved two seats in a jet for him and Viv to escape from the impending attack. Carl agrees to go along and gets his dog, and then tries to warn Viv. She does not believe him and hangs up on him. Carl then calls his students and warns them to take shelter.

The Emergency Alert System comes on the air and broadcasts an EAN warning of the terrorist attack. Carl calls Viv again, who now believes him but cannot leave because she is working the crisis at City Hall. He shows up at the airport, and tells Tom he's not going. He gives Tom his dog and drives to the government building to find Viv and take shelter. With two minutes left until the bomb detonates, he finds her working the 911 service. When he tells Viv to go to the shelter with him, she expresses concerns about the people needing help. In the last seconds before detonation, Viv and Carl say they love each other one last time. The explosion is not shown, however Carl gives an afterword.

== Cast ==
Character	Actor
Carl	Hill Harper
Viv	Robinne Lee
Tom Arnold	Tom Arnold
Trey	Carmine Giovinazzo
Robert Forte	Eddie Cahill
Teresa	Bellamy Young
Wendy Romer	Melissa Fitzgerald
Matt Romer	Anthony DeSantis
Rick Smyth	Gordon Currie
Johnny Dorey	Jason Manuel Olazabal
Dr. Fred Natanz	David Ackert
Heather Tom	Heather Tom

== Accolades ==
- Boston International Film Festival – Best Actor (Robinne Lee), Best Story Line (Chris Angel), and Best Director (Chris Angel)
- Breckenridge Film Festival – Best Comedy Award
- Urbanworld Film Festival – Audience Award
