= Miss Dial =

2013 American romantic-comedy film

- Directed by: David Steinberg
- Music by: Chris Alan Lee
- Release date: February 16, 2013
- Running time: 88 minutes
- Country: United States

Miss Dial is an American romantic comedy film released February 16, 2013. The plot centers on a customer service representative who is a remote worker. One day, she decides to abandon her job duties, and instead spends her time calling random people, looking for new connections.

== Cast ==
- Robinne Lee as Erica
- Sam Jaeger as Kyle
- Jon Huertas as Alex
- Sara Rue as Sam
- Amanda Crew as Amanda
- Beth Grant as Mrs. Wojiechowski
- Gabrielle Union as Long Story Caller
- Samm Levine as Prank Caller
- Dendrie Taylor as TV Caller
- Dulé Hill as Popcorn Caller
- Hill Harper as Political Nutcase
