= Unnecessary Trouble =

Single by Demetria McKinney featuring Kandi
- Released: 26 December 2015
- Genre: R&B
- Length: 3:57
- Label: RTD Entertainment
- Songwriters: Kandi Burruss; Kislyck Hasley

Demetria McKinney singles chronology
"Trade it All" (2015)	"Unnecessary Trouble" (2015)

"Unnecessary Trouble" is a song by American recording artist Demetria McKinney. The song is featured and written by American singer Kandi.

== Critical reception ==
The song was met with positive to mixed reviews by critics.

Singersroom reviewed the song in their article "Kandi opens the song with a verse to warn McKinney of the shady things her man has been doing behind her back, to which McKinney refuses to believe. “Girl don’t tell me sh*t bout my man no more / Just like I don’t say what I heard about yours,” Demetria replies." "This whole situation played out on a season of RHOA. Could this song be inspired by real-life events regarding McKinney’s CEO boyfriend Roger Bobb? In the Derek Blanks-directed clip, the ladies poke fun at the show's drama by spoofing Bravo's "Watch What Happens Live!" hosted by Andy Cohen (the clip features a character named Randy Cohen); former RHOA cast member Claudia Jordan cameos in the fun, colorful video." Kel & Mel reviews stated "One of the biggest musical surprises to come out of The Real Housewives franchise has been Demetria McKinney.. Now, as it’s time for her to build add to her own discography, she releases a duet with mentor and musical vet Kandi Burruss. The track, about two women figuring out what the boundaries of their friendship are when it comes to speaking on each other’s personal lives, is a gem."

== Music video ==
The video premiered on RTD Entertainment's official YouTube channel on December 26, 2015. The music video was later uploaded to McKinney's VEVO account on January 3, 2016. The video was directed by Derek Blanks and featured a cameo from Real Housewives of Atlanta guest starring cast member Claudia Jordan.

== Track listing ==
Digital download

1. "Unnecessary Trouble" – 3:57

== Release history ==
Region	Date	Format	Label
Worldwide	26 December 2015	Digital download	RDT Entertainment
