= I Dream (musical) =

I Dream is a musical by Douglas Tappin, who serves as the librettist, composer and lyricist. The production narrates the life of Martin Luther King Jr., culminating in the events surrounding Martin Luther King Jr.'s assassination. Premiering in Atlanta in 2010, I Dream skillfully blends musical theatre and rhythm and blues to highlight the pivotal moments of the Civil Rights Movement, as well as Dr. King's personal struggles. Over time, the production transformed into semi-staged opera performances across various cities, but it has now returned to its original musical format.

== Introduction/Background/Origination ==
I Dream originated as a musical and premiered on the Alliance Stage at the Woodruff Arts Center in Atlanta, Georgia, in July 2010. Douglas Tappin, sought to create a work that captured both the public and private facets of Martin Luther King Jr.'s life.

== Original cast and creative team ==
- Jasmine Guy – Director
- Carl Marsh – Orchestration
- Keith Williams – Musical director

With choreography by Dawn Axam, and designs by Kat Conley (set), Joseph Futral (lighting), Shilla Benning (costumes), and Bobby Johnston (sound). The producers were Dej Mahoney, Cedric Perrier, Tim Bowen, and Douglas Tappin.

The cast included:

- Quentin Earl Darrington as Martin Luther King Jr.
- Demetria McKinney as Coretta Scott King
- AverySunshine as Grandma
- Desmond Ellington as Hosea Williams
- Ben Polite as Ralph Abernathy
- Bob Carlisle as Professor

== Synopsis ==
I Dream takes place within Ralph Abernathy's consciousness as he nears the end of his life. Accompanied by Bria, a young modern-day activist, Abernathy confronts the struggles of his past and his relationship with Dr. King. Through Bria, the audience is invited to reflect on their own convictions as they experience the powerful and haunting journey through music and dialogue.

== Productions ==
=== Origination as a Musical (Atlanta, 2010) ===
The world premiere of I Dream took place on the Alliance stage at the Woodruff Arts Center in Atlanta in July 2010. The original production was directed by Jasmine Guy and featured Quentin Earl Darrington as Martin Luther King Jr., Demetria McKinney as Coretta Scott King, and AverySunshine as Grandma. The production was praised for its ambitious storytelling, with Creative Loafing noting its comparison to Broadway musicals such as Jesus Christ Superstar and Evita. It was nominated in 10 categories for Atlanta’s 2009/2010 Suzi Bass Awards, winning for Outstanding World Premiere.

=== Concept Recording & JFK Center In-Concert Performance (2015, 2017) ===
A concept recording of I Dream was released in 2015, featuring performances by Quentin Darrington and AverySunshine. In January 2017, an in-concert version of I Dream was performed at the John F. Kennedy Center for the Performing Arts in Washington, D.C., receiving positive reviews for its powerful score and emotive portrayal of Dr. King’s life.

=== Opera Productions (2017–2020) ===
Between 2017 and 2020, I Dream was adapted into an opera, allowing the work to reach new audiences while still maintaining the core elements of the original musical. Notable productions include:

- Grand Rapids Symphony (2017): Semi-staged as part of the Grand Rapids Symphony's series.
- Toledo Opera (2018): This production by Toledo Opera marked the work’s transformation into the operatic realm.
- Opera Carolina(2018 & 2020): I Dream was performed twice by Opera Carolina in Charlotte, showcasing a unique fusion of operatic and musical theater elements.

==== Notable Opera Casts ====
- Martin Luther King Jr. – Derrick Davis
- Coretta Scott King – Laquita Mitchell (Grand Rapids, Toledo) & Alyson Cambridge
- Hosea Williams - Victor Ryan Robertson

=== Return to Musical (Apollo Work Session, 2024) ===
Following its opera adaptations, I Dream returned to its roots as a musical. A work session was held at the Apollo Theater in New York City, where the production was refined to its original musical form. This marked a significant turning point in its development, affirming the work's place as a contemporary musical.

=== Concert at Rensselaer Polytechnic Institute (2024) ===
In October 2024, I Dream was performed in concert at Rensselaer Polytechnic Institute (RPI) in Troy, New York, as a tribute to the civil rights movement. This concert aimed to connect the musical with RPI students, faculty, and the local community. Douglas Tappin discussed the performance in a radio interview on Media Sanctuary and in a televised interview, where he reflected on the musical’s enduring themes of justice and resilience.

=== UK Concert Premiere at The Other Palace (2026) ===
I Dream will have its UK premiere at The Other Palace main space on Monday 27 April 2026.

== Recording ==
A concept album of I Dream entitled I Dream (The Concept Recording) was recorded in 2015, featuring Quentin Darrington as Martin and AverySunshine as Coretta– released for digital download and streaming, including on iTunes, Google Play, and Spotify.

== Reception ==
I Dream opened to mostly positive reviews from both the press and those involved with the civil rights movement. RollingOut.com said: "The life of Dr. King as chronicled in the stage musical I Dream, is right on time as a reminder of what the fight was for. The dynamically talented cast delivered stirring performances to move audience members through each riveting scene." Creative Loafing reported that "Tappin's hugely ambitious world premiere follows the example of Broadway's big, rock-influenced musicals such as Jesus Christ Superstar, Evita, and Les Misérables." The Huffington Post stated: "[The show brought] some of the heartiest former Civil Rights activists in the house to tears, before raising them to their feet at the finale for, perhaps, the greatest standing ovation the show will ever receive." Broadway World stated: From the buzz in the Knight lobby afterwards, I'd say the performance had clearly sustained the audience's enthusiasm in all respects.

== Awards and nominations ==
Nominated in 10 categories for Atlanta's 2009/2010 Suzi Bass Award, I Dream won in the Outstanding World Premiere (Play or Musical) category.

== See also ==
- Civil rights movement in popular culture
- Martin Luther King Jr.
- Coretta Scott King
- Ralph Abernathy
