= Bobbi Kristina (film) =

- Based on: Life of Bobbi Kristina Brown
- Written by: Rhonda Baraka
- Directed by: Ty Hodges
- Starring: Demetria McKinney; Joy Rovaris; Nadji Jeter; Vivica A. Fox
- Composer: Kenneth Lampl
- Country of origin: United States
- Original language: English

Production
- Producers: Rhonda Baraka; David Eubanks; Keith Neal; Ron Robinson; James Seppelfrick
- Cinematography: Marcos Durian
- Editor: Dante Wyatt
- Production companies: Simmons Shelley Entertainment; Swirl Films

Original release
- Network: TV One
- Release: October 8, 2017

Bobbi Kristina is a 2017 American biographical drama film about Bobbi Kristina Brown, directed by Ty Hodges and written by Rhonda Baraka. The film stars Joy Rovaris, Nadji Jeter, Demetria McKinney, Vivica A. Fox, Hassan Johnson, and Ricco Ross. The film premiered on TV One on October 8, 2017.

== Plot ==
The films involves Bobbi Kristina Brown growing up in the spotlight, frequently appearing on stage and walking the red carpet alongside her parents, Whitney Houston and Bobby Brown, like other famous people's kids. For the majority, she was just 'Whitney's and Bobby's daughter,' the tiny child behind the scenes who had no identity other than the impression that the public and media had given her. However, Brown's unseen narrative is one of tenacity, faith, friendship, adventure, dreams, struggle, and love—a mother-daughter love.

== Cast ==
- Joy Rovaris as Bobbi Kristina Brown
- Demetria McKinney as Whitney Houston
- Nadji Jeter as Nick Gordon
- Vivica A. Fox as Pat Houston
- Hassan Johnson as Bobby Brown
- Ricco Ross as Uncle Ray
- Candace B. Harris as Taylor
- Brooke Butler as Shanna
- Carl Kennedy as Gary
- Alexandra Reid as Britt
- Sherry Richards as Renee
- Tobias Truvillion as Butter
- Donny Carrington as Gary Michael
- Tyler Lain as Josh
- Le'Azionna Braden as Young Krissi
- Mikari Tarpley as Young Taylor
