= Demetria McKinney =

American actress and singer (born 1979)

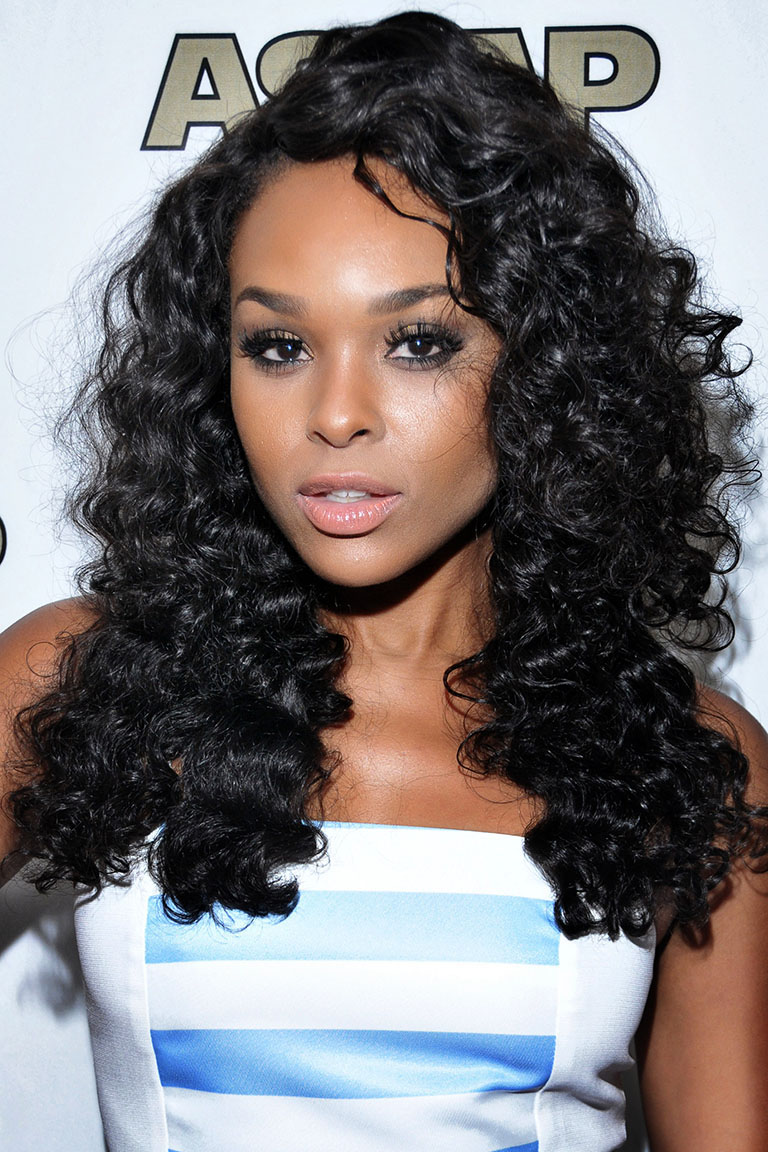
- McKinney in August 2015
- Born: Demetria Dyan McKinney; August 27, 1979 (age 47); Albuquerque, New Mexico, U.S.
- Other names: Dee Dee McKinney, Demi
- Education: Fort Walton Beach High School
- Occupations: Actress, model, singer
- Years active: 2000–present
- Children: 1
- Website: artistecard.com

Demetria Dyan McKinney (born August 27, 1979) is an American actress, model, and singer. From 2006 to 2012, during its original run, she starred in the TBS sitcom Tyler Perry's House of Payne, and a BET revival of the show was announced in 2020. Her other series regular roles include TV One sitcom The Rickey Smiley Show, Bounce TV prime time soap opera Saints & Sinners and Syfy horror drama Superstition, as well as Motherland: Fort Salem on Freeform.

Her stage credits include playing Coretta Scott King in the Rhythm and Blues Opera I Dream (2010), and starring as Deena Jones in a 2012 production of Dreamgirls at The Muny. In 2017, McKinney played Whitney Houston in the TV One film Bobbi Kristina. She released her debut album Officially Yours in 2017. In 2023, McKinney portrayed Sheila Johnson in the TV film God’s Grace: The Sheila Johnson Story.

== Career ==
=== Acting ===
McKinney has performed in a number of Tyler Perry's stage plays, including Meet The Browns, Why Did I Get Married and Madea's Family Christmas. She starred as Janine Shelton-Payne on the TBS comedy series Tyler Perry's House of Payne from 2006 to 2012. She was nominated for a 2009 National Association for Multi-ethnicity in Communications (NAMIC) Vision Award for Best Performance in a Comedy, in recognition of her work on House of Payne. She returned for the House of Payne spin-off The Paynes in 2018. McKinney has guest starred on Necessary Roughness, Drop Dead Diva, Devious Maids, Chicago Med, and Being Mary Jane. She also appeared on Bravo's The Real Housewives of Atlanta, as a recurring cast member during the seventh season, and a guest star on the eighth season.

From 2012 to 2014, McKinney had a series regular role on the TV One comedy series, The Rickey Smiley Show. In 2016, she was cast as Tamara Austin in the Bounce TV prime time television soap opera Saints & Sinners. In 2017, she was cast opposite Mario Van Peebles and Robinne Lee in the Syfy horror drama Superstition. The series was canceled after one season. Also in 2017, McKinney starred in the TV One movie Bobbi Kristina as Whitney Houston, the late icon and mother to Bobbi Kristina.

McKinney had a recurring role in the BET drama series The Quad from 2017 to 2018. She also played a leading role in the 2018 Christmas themed romantic film A Stone Cold Christmas. In 2019, she starred in the Urban Movie Channel family drama series A House Divided alongside Paula Jai Parker. She was later cast in the Freeform drama series Motherland: Fort Salem. In 2022, she began starring on The Winchesters.

=== Singing ===
McKinney has performed in a number of musicals. In 2010, she performed in the Rhythm and Blues opera I Dream. She appeared in Dreamgirls and performed with Jennifer Holliday in 2012, and lent vocals to R&B singer Anthony David's album Love Out Loud. In 2015, her single "Trade It All" charted on Billboard's Adult R&B Songs.

In 2017, McKinney released her debut album Officially Yours. She received a nomination for the NAACP Image Award for Outstanding New Artist. From this album, she released three singles: "Is This Love", "Happy" and "Easy" which peaked at #4 on the Adult R&B Songs chart.

== Personal life ==
McKinney faced homelessness at the age of 17 and has one child, a son.

== Filmography ==
=== Film ===
| Year | Film | Role | Notes |
|---|---|---|---|
| 2004 | Tyler Perry’s Meet The Browns | Kim Brown | Video |
| 2006 | Tyler Perry’s Why Did I Get Married? | Trina | Video |
| 2007 | Daddy's Little Girls | Club Lady | |
| 2007 | Standing Reign | Reign | Short |
| 2008 | Before I Wake | Tracy Mason | Short |
| 2010 | Breaking Up Is Hard to Do | Shonda | |
| 2011 | Church Girl | Emily | |
| 2012 | Raising Izzie | Singer | TV movie |
| 2013 | In the Meantime | Felicia | TV movie |
| 2013 | Let the Church Say Amen | Tawny | TV movie |
| 2017 | Bobbi Kristina | Whitney Houston | TV movie |
| 2017 | Providence Island | Mary Dunbar | |
| 2018 | A Stone Cold Christmas | Mia Stone | |
| 2021 | Coins Forever | Althea | |
| 2021 | Kirk Franklin's A Gospel Christmas | Olivia | TV movie |
| 2022 | Sons 2 the Grave | Vanessa Bishop | |

=== Television ===
| Year | Title | Role | Notes |
|---|---|---|---|
| 2006–12 | Tyler Perry's House of Payne | Janine Shelton–Payne | Recurring Cast: Season 1, Main Cast: Season 2-6 |
| 2011 | Necessary Roughness | Leanne | Episode: "Whose Team Are You On?" |
| 2013–14 | The Rickey Smiley Show | Monica | Guest Cast: Season 2-3 |
| 2014 | Let's Stay Together | Shauna | Episode: "Date My Wife, Please" |
| 2014 | Drop Dead Diva | Lisa | Episode: "Cheers & Jeers" |
| 2014 | Devious Maids | Natasha Jones | Episode: "Private Lives" |
| 2014–15 | The Real Housewives of Atlanta | Herself | Recurring Cast: Season 7, Guest: Season 8 |
| 2015 | Mann & Wife | Lisa Lovejoy | Episode: "Mann-ditory Counseling" |
| 2016 | Chicago Med | Mrs. James | Episode: "Win Loss" |
| 2016–19 | Saints & Sinners | Tamara Austin Calloway | Recurring Cast: Season 1 & 4, Main Cast: Season 2-3 |
| 2017 | Being Mary Jane | Jessie Lords | Episode: "Feeling Lost" |
| 2017–18 | Superstition | May Westbrook | Main Cast |
| 2017–18 | The Quad | Beretta Hobbs | Recurring Cast: Season 1, Guest: Season 2 |
| 2018 | The Paynes | Janine Shelton–Payne | Recurring Cast |
| 2019–23 | A House Divided | Carissa Walker | Main Cast |
| 2020 | American Soul | June Pointer | Episode: "Satisfaction" |
| 2020–present | Tyler Perry's House of Payne | Janine Shelton–Payne | Recurring Cast: Seasons 9-12, Main: Season 13–present |
| 2020–22 | Motherland: Fort Salem | Anacostia Quartermaine | Main Cast |
| 2022-23 | The Winchesters | Ada Monroe | Main Cast |

== Discography ==
=== Studio albums ===
| Title | Album details | Peak positions |
| Title | Album details | US Indie |
|---|---|---|
| Officially Yours | Released: October 6, 2017; Label: Entertainment One Music; Formats: CD, digital download | 48 |

=== Singles ===
| Title | Year | Peak chart position | | Album |
| Title | Year | US | US Adult R&B | Album |
|---|---|---|---|---|
| "Get Yo ..Ish" | 2011 | — | — | —N/a |
| "Take Away This Love" | 2012 | — | — | —N/a |
| "Still Believe in Love (feat. Musiq Soulchild)" | 2013 | — | — | —N/a |
| "Work With Me" | 2013 | — | — | —N/a |
| "100 (feat. da Brat)" | 2015 | — | — | —N/a |
| "Trade It All" | 2015 | — | 25 | —N/a |
| "Unnecessary Trouble (feat. Kandi Burruss)" | 2015 | — | — | —N/a |
| "Easy" | 2017 | — | 4 | Officially Yours |
| "Is This Love" | 2017 | — | — | Officially Yours |
