= Superstition (TV series) =

- Genre: Drama; Horror; Mystery; Thriller; Southern Gothic; Supernatural fiction
- Created by: Joel Anderson Thompson; Mario Van Peebles
- Composer: Jonathan Hartman
- Country of origin: United States
- Original language: English
- No. of seasons: 1
- No. of episodes: 12

Production
- Executive producers: Joel Anderson Thompson; Laurence Andries; Barry Gordon
- Producers: Mario Van Peebles; Barry Gordon; Mitchell Galin
- Production location: Atlanta
- Cinematography: Anthony J. Rickert-Epstein
- Editor: Erik C.Anderson
- Camera setup: Multi-camera
- Running time: 43 minutes
- Production companies: MVPTV; XLrator Media

Original release
- Network: Syfy
- Release: October 20, 2017 – January 18, 2018

Superstition is an American mystery-drama television series that was commissioned by Syfy with a 12-episode direct-to-series order in December 2016. The show premiered on October 20, 2017, with the series' first season concluding on January 18, 2018. On June 6, 2018, the series was cancelled after one season.

== Plot ==
The episodes revolve around the Hastings family who owns and directs a funeral home and the cemetery in the sleepy town of La Rochelle, Georgia. The basement of the family home provides space for the city morgue as well where Tilly, the medical examiner, works. Having long been hunters of the supernatural, the Hastings and Tilly make sure that Infernals don't wreak havoc among the human populace.

Things start to unravel when Friday the 13th arrives, with the appearance of the Hastings' oldest son who left the family sixteen years ago. Supernatural forces begin descending upon the town, with Calvin and his family doing their best to protect everyone.

== Cast ==
=== Main ===
- Mario Van Peebles as Isaac Hastings
- Robinne Lee as Bea Hastings
- Brad James as Calvin Hastings, Bea and Isaac's oldest son
- Demetria McKinney as May Westbrook, the Chief of Police
- Morgana Van Peebles as Garvey Westbrook, May's 16-year-old daughter
- Tatiana Lia Zappardino as Tilly, the medical examiner and researcher of all things supernatural for the Hastings

=== Recurring ===
- W. Earl Brown as The Dredge, the powerful entity out to destroy the Hastings
- T. C. Carter as Russ, Garvey's boyfriend
- Jasmine Guy as Aunt Nancy, an unlikely ally to the Hastings family
- David E. Collier as Dr. Kim, a doctor who is later possessed by The Dredge
- Nick Hagelin as Raymond Patla, the naive yet harmless police deputy
- Joaquin Montes as James, a close friend of Isaac's from olden days
- Myles Truitt as Arlo, the Hastings' youngest son who died, but reappears in hallucinations

== Episodes ==
No.	Title	Directed by	Written by	Original release date	US viewers (millions)
1	"Pilot"	Mario Van Peebles	Joel Anderson Thompson & Mario Van Peebles	October 20, 2017	0.45
As Friday the 13th approaches, the Hastings couple's oldest son, Calvin, returns home after sixteen years. Unwilling to immediately explain to his father his reasons for returning, Isaac is sceptical of his son's motivation for the family business.
2	"The Dredge"	Mario Van Peebles	Laurence Andries	October 27, 2017	0.33
3	"Half Truths & Half Breeds"	Mario Van Peebles	Brusta Brown & John Mitchell Todd	November 3, 2017	0.40
4	"Through the Looking Glass"	Mario Van Peebles	Teresa Huang	November 4, 2017	0.40
5	"Tangled Web"	John Harrison	Christopher Hollier	November 17, 2017	0.35
6	"Dr. Dredge M.D"	Mario Van Peebles	Mario Van Peebles	December 1, 2017	0.25
7	"Echoes of My Mind"	Mario Van Peebles	Andrea Thornton	December 14, 2017	0.20
8	"You're Not My Momma"	Ernest Farino	Brusta Brown & John Mitchell Todd	December 21, 2017	0.28
9	"Uncle Bubba"	Mario Van Peebles	Christopher Hollier	December 28, 2017	0.28
10	"Green-on-Blue"	Laurence Andries	Laurence Andries	January 4, 2018	0.27
11	"Back to One"	John Harrison	Laurence Andries	January 11, 2018	0.48
12	"Resurrection"	Mario Van Peebles	Joel Anderson Thompson	January 18, 2018	0.32

== Broadcast and release ==
Netflix holds the international airing rights to Superstition. The series was released on Netflix in the UK and Canada on April 29, 2018.
