= Robinne Lee =

American actress (b. 1974)

- Born: July 16, 1974 (age 52); Mount Vernon, New York, U.S
- Education: Yale University; Columbia Law School
- Occupations: Actress, author
- Years active: 1997–present
- Spouse: Eric Hayes (m. 2011)
- Children: 2

Robinne Lee (born July 16, 1974) is an American actress and author. She made her screen debut in the 1997 independent film Hav Plenty, and later has appeared in films National Security (2003), Deliver Us from Eva (2003), Hitch (2005), Seven Pounds (2008), Fifty Shades Darker (2017), and Fifty Shades Freed (2018).

== Life and career ==
Lee was born in Mount Vernon, New York on July 16, 1974. A graduate of Yale University (1991) and Columbia Law School, Lee began her acting career as part of the ensemble cast of the romantic comedy Hav Plenty in 1997, which was shown at Toronto Film Festival. She spent the following years working in smaller films, and well as co-starred in television movies include The Runaway opposite Debbi Morgan. On television, Lee also guest-starred on Buffy the Vampire Slayer, and Numbers. She also appeared in R&B singer Usher's music video for his 2004 single "Confessions Part II".

In 2003, Lee appeared in two films, action comedy National Security, with Martin Lawrence and Steve Zahn, and opposite LL Cool J and Gabrielle Union in the romantic comedy Deliver Us from Eva. In 2005, Lee had a role in box-office hit Hitch, starring Will Smith. In 2008, she co-starred again with Smith in the drama film Seven Pounds playing his character's fiancee. As lead actress, she starred in the 2008 comedy-drama This Is Not a Test. In 2009, Lee co-starred alongside Don Cheadle in the comedy film Hotel for Dogs.

In 2007, Lee had a recurring role on the TBS sitcom Tyler Perry's House of Payne and shot an independent film called This Is Not a Test. From 2013 to 2014, she played Avery Daniels in the first season of the critically acclaimed BET drama series, Being Mary Jane. From 2017 to 2018, she starred in the Syfy horror drama series, Superstition.

Lee played Ros Bailey in Fifty Shades Darker (2017) and Fifty Shades Freed (2018), the sequels to Fifty Shades of Grey.

Lee's debut novel The Idea of You was published on June 13, 2017, by St. Martin's Press. The story follows Solène Marchand, a 40-year-old mother and owner of a prestigious art gallery in Los Angeles, who falls for a considerably younger British popstar, idolized by her 12-year-old daughter. The audiobook, read by Lee herself, was released on April 3, 2018, by Tantor Media. A film adaptation by Jennifer Westfeldt was announced in June 2021, entered production in 2022 and released on May 2, 2024 starring Anne Hathaway.

== Filmography ==
=== Film ===
Year	Title	Role	Notes
1997	Hav Plenty	Leigh Darling	
1997	Get That Number	Girl in the park	Short
2000	Cupid & Cate	Ellen	TV movie
2000	The Runaway	Cecily Monroe	TV movie
2002	Almost a Woman	Miss Brown	TV movie
2003	National Security	Denise	
2003	Deliver Us from Eva	Bethany Dandrige	
2004	Shook	Jill	Short
2004	13 Going on 30	Rachel	
2005	Hitch	Cressida	
2008	This Is Not a Test	Viv	
2008	Seven Pounds	Sarah	
2009	Hotel for Dogs	Carol	
2012	Hear Me	Tracey	Short
2012	Divorce Invitation	Joan	
2012	The Undershepherd	Shirley	
2013	Miss Dial	Erica	
2013	Curdled	Mara	Short
2014	Echo Park	Rachel	
2014	Second Chance Christmas	Maisie	TV movie
2015	Forgiveness	First Lady Vivica Jenkins	
2016	9 Rides	Girlfriend	
2016	The Bounce Back	Sam	
2017	Fifty Shades Darker	Ros Bailey	
2017	'Til Death Do Us Part	Chelsea	
2017	Sex and Violence	Donna Churchland	
2018	Fifty Shades Freed	Ros Bailey	
2018	Holly Day	Holly Day	
2019	Rattlesnakes	Celine McQueen	
2019	Paper Friends	Ana	
2021	Greyson Family Christmas	Renee Greyson	

=== Television ===
Year	Title	Role	Notes
2002	Buffy the Vampire Slayer	Charlotte	Episode: "Sleeper"
2004	The Big House	Bianca	Episode: "Hart Transplant"
2005	Numb3rs	Agent Harrill	Episodes: "Uncertainly Principle" & "Sabotage"
2007	House of Payne	Nicole Jamieson	Recurring cast: Season 1–2
2013–2014	Being Mary Jane	Avery Daniels	Recurring cast: season 1
2014	Farmed and Dangerous	Diane	Recurring cast
2014	Mind Games	Margaret Bradley	Episode: "Texts, Lies and Audiotapes"
2015	Almost 30	Mya Knight	Episode: "Almost Promoted"
2017	NCIS	Doctor	Episode: "Something Blue"
2017–2018	Superstition	Bea Hastings	Main cast
2019	No Good Nick	Helen	Episode: "The Bank Job"
2023	Kaleidoscope	Lily Vernon	Episode: "Violet"
