= The Trump Network =

Defunct multi-level marketing company

- Industry: Multi-level marketing
- Predecessor: Ideal Health, Inc.
- Founded: March 1997; 29 years ago in Massachusetts, United States
- Founders: Lou DeCaprio; Todd Stanwood; Scott Stanwood
- Defunct: Early 2012
- Fate: Assets sold to Bioceutica (early 2012)
- Headquarters: Rowley, Massachusetts, United States
- Area served: United States
- Key people: Lou DeCaprio (president); Todd Stanwood (chief executive officer); Scott Stanwood (vice president of communications)
- Products: Vitamins, energy drinks, skin-care
- Owners: 1997–2012: Lou DeCaprio; Todd Stanwood; Scott Stanwood; 2012: Bioceutica
- Number of employees: 20,000 salespeople (2010)
- Website: Official website

The Trump Network was a multi-level marketing company named after businessman (and, later, 45th and 47th U.S. President) Donald Trump. The company, which sold vitamins and health products, was initially founded as Ideal Health in 1997, before being renamed in 2009 as part of a licensing agreement between Trump and the owners. The licensing agreement expired at the end of 2011, and the company's remaining assets were sold to Bioceutica the following year.

== History ==
=== Ideal Health ===
Ideal Health, Inc. was founded as a multi-level marketing company in March 1997. The company, headquartered in Lynnfield, Massachusetts, was founded by Lou DeCaprio and brothers Scott and Todd Stanwood, who were friends of DeCaprio. The three men had previously opened New England Wine and Spirits in Newburyport, Massachusetts, in 1991. After the Stanwoods' sister had joined a direct sales company in 1989, she encouraged them to get involved in the industry. The three men worked for Nu Skin Enterprises, a multi-level marketing company, and decided to form Ideal Health after seeing how successful Nu Skin had become.

Ideal Health hired salespeople who would then conduct their own marketing to sell a customized vitamin supplement program, which was determined through a urinalysis test to learn about the customer's health. Salespeople made money through commission on sales and by recruiting other salespeople. The products were shipped directly to customers rather than being stored by company salespeople.

By 2004, numerous complaints had been filed with the Federal Trade Commission (FTC) against Ideal Health, by salespeople who alleged that they spent thousands of dollars on company products that did not generate revenue. One of Ideal Health's products, Supreme Greens, was the subject of an FTC lawsuit for its false claim of being able to cure cancer. In 2004, Ideal Health acquired and began selling a line of skin-care products known as BIO Essentials.

=== The Trump Network ===
In 2008, Donald Trump began searching for a network marketing company with which to become associated. Trump's lawyer Jerry Schrager met DeCaprio during a business presentation that DeCaprio was doing in New York City. At the time, Ideal Health was seeking a partnership to increase its recognition. Trump met with DeCaprio and the Stanwoods at Trump Tower in Manhattan. Trump later recalled, "We hit it off. I checked into their past, and they were solid people. They had a nice track record, but even more importantly they had a lot of people who thought highly of them."

In March 2009 Trump agreed to license his name to the company, which would be re-branded as the Trump Network. Trump also agreed to make occasional appearances at events to promote the company's products. Trump had initially considered taking a financial stake in the company. DeCaprio remained as the president of the company, while Todd Stanwood served as the chief executive officer and Scott Stanwood served as the vice president of communications. The Trump Network launched on November 13, 2009, with a ceremony attended by Trump and held at the Hyatt Regency hotel in downtown Miami.

Trump referred to the company as a "rescue and recovery program" for people who were suffering from the effects of the Great Recession and who needed extra income. For $48, people who wanted to be salespeople could buy a marketing kit and three months of access to a personalized web site to promote the company products. Also available was a $497 package that also included coupons, CDs, and sales tips. Marketers had the right to sell any unsold inventory back to the company. Packaging for the company's products was imprinted with Trump's family crest, but the lineup of products remained mostly the same. Trump created a scientific advisory committee to evaluate the products sold by the company. Trump also registered 18 negative Internet domain names, including TrumpNetworkFraud.com and DonaldTrumpPonziScheme.com, to prevent websites from being registered with those names.

As of March 2010 Trump Network products were available in each U.S. state, with plans to expand to other countries. By then the company had relocated to a larger building at 428 Newburyport Turnpike in Rowley, Massachusetts. The company had previously been headquartered at 12 Kent Way in Byfield, Massachusetts.

The presence of Trump's surname increased the number of salespeople who signed up with the company. By December 2010, the company had grown 373 percent since Trump became involved, and had doubled its staff to approximately 50, with an additional 20,000 salespeople worldwide, up from 5,000 people prior to Trump's involvement. The company stated that revenue, at that time, was nearly $40 million. Stephanie Castagnier, Liza Mucheru-Wisner, and Steuart Martens, who were candidates on the tenth season of Trump's reality television series, The Apprentice, became salespeople for the Trump Network.

As of January 2011, the Trump Network had plans to add additional products and expand to Europe and Asia, while Trump hoped for the company to ultimately become larger than Amway, its largest competitor. That month, DeCaprio addressed claims that salespeople were not earning money through the company: "Many times, if people aren't having success in recruiting, it has to do with not believing in themselves." Trump stated, "This is supposed to be a second income for people. This is not about them quitting their job. [Though] for some of them, it might lead to that." In late 2011, Trump's licensing contract with the company ended. Bioceutica purchased the Trump Network's assets in early 2012 for an undisclosed amount of money, marking the end of the company.

Some salespeople were disappointed to learn that Trump did not have a larger role in the company. In January 2016, Scott Stanwood declined to discuss the company because of confidentiality agreements. Trump's lawyer, Alan Garten, said many salespeople did "very well" and noted that Trump's role in the company was limited to the licensing of his surname and to providing motivational speeches to salespeople: "Anyone who claims that they were not aware of the extent of Mr. Trump's role is lying to himself." The company's website had included a disclaimer that read, "The Trump Network is not owned nor are any products sold over 'The Trump Network' developed or manufactured by Donald J. Trump or any entity owned or controlled by Donald J. Trump." Garten later stated that Trump's role "was clearly disclosed, to everyone involved in the company and its members, whether it be in the member's independent contractor agreements, the marketing materials, or on the products themselves."

== Products ==
As of 2011, the Trump Network offered two multivitamins: Prime Essentials and Custom Essentials, the latter being more expensive. Custom Essentials used a urinalyses test known as PrivaTest to determine the vitamins required by each customer. At the time, Trump Network also offered children's health snacks known as Snazzle Snaxxs, as well as QuikStik energy drinks and a diet program known as Silhouette Solutions. After Trump became involved, the company added a line of skin-care products known as BioCé Cosmeceuticals. As of July 2017, the PrivaTest was still available via Bioceutica's website.

Some nutritional experts noted that there was no evidence that the vitamins provided any benefits to people who consumed them; they also criticized the PrivaTest, stating that no urine test can reveal whether a person has a vitamin deficiency. Harvard University doctor Pieter Cohen, an expert on supplements, considered the PrivaTest to be a "scam," calling it "a bogus program to make profit for the people who are selling it. It's fantasy."
