= ACN Inc. =

Multi-level marketing company providing telecommunications and other services

ACN, Inc.
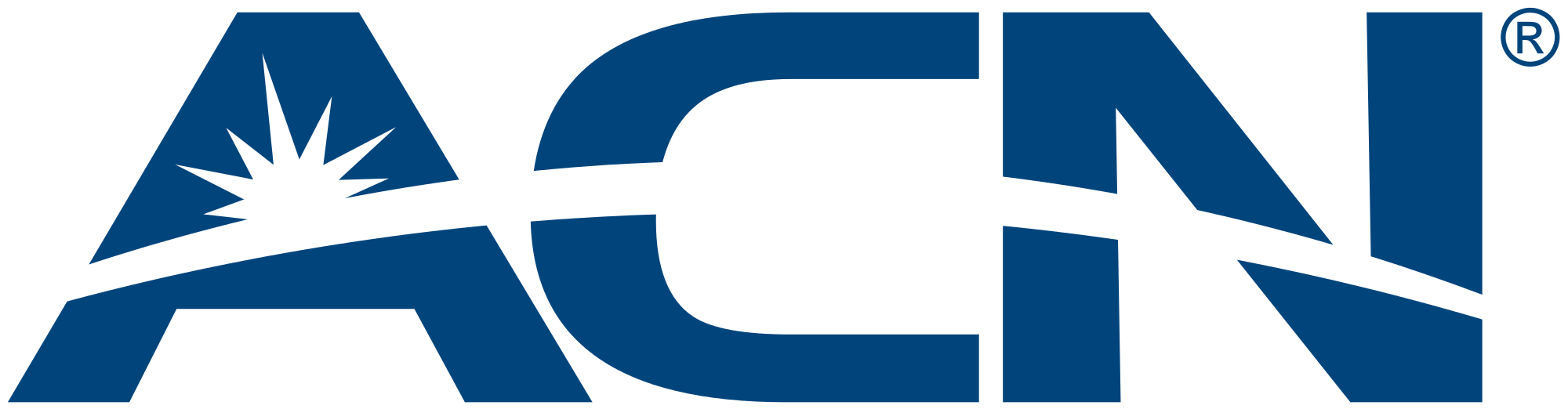
- Type: Private
- Industry: Multi-level marketing, telecommunications
- Founded: 1993
- Founders: Robert Stevanovski; Gregory Provenzano; Anthony Cupisz; Michael Cupisz
- Headquarters: Concord, North Carolina, US
- Products: Landline; Wireless; Broadband
- Revenue: US$750 million (2016)
- Number of employees: 1,100
- Website: acn.com

ACN, Inc. is a North American multi-level marketing (MLM) company. It provides telecommunications, energy, merchant services and other services, depending on the country, through a network of independent sellers who also can recruit other sellers. Based in Concord, North Carolina, United States, ACN began operations in the United States in 1993. As of 2019, the company reported that it operates in twenty-seven countries.

Donald Trump and three of his children had some involvement with ACN during his term as president of the United States. In 2018, a class action lawsuit was filed against them alleging fraud, false advertising, unfair competition, and a now-dismissed allegation of racketeering. In July 2021, a US appeals court ruled that the case cannot go to arbitration. The lawsuit is ongoing as of March 2022. It would be dismissed from federal court in January 2024, with the plaintiffs asked to refile in the state courts where they reside.

== Business model ==
The company is based in Concord, North Carolina, United States. ACN has international offices located in Montreal, Canada; Amsterdam, the Netherlands; Sydney, Australia; Wrocław, Poland; Gothenburg, Sweden; Seoul, South Korea, and the United Mexican States.

ACN's income disclosure statement bears the warning that "not all ACN independent representatives make a profit and no one can be guaranteed success as an ACN independent representative."

== History ==
In 1993, Robert Stevanovski, Greg Provenzano, and twin brothers Tony and Mike Cupisz founded the American Communications Network, Inc. ACN opened for business in January 1993 with twenty initial "independent representatives". ACN's initial business was as a marketing arm for a long-distance reseller called LCI Communications. This relationship lasted for five years until LCI was acquired by Qwest Communications. By 1998, ACN was listed in Inc. Magazine's "Inc. 500" list as No. Twenty-two in this annual list of the five hundred fastest growing private companies in America.

ACN operated as a gas and electricity retailer, through the subsidiaries ACN Energy and ACN Utility Services, prior to its energy assets being acquired by Commerce Energy Group in 2006. In 2008, ACN moved its headquarters from Farmington Hills, Michigan to Concord, North Carolina. In 2014, ACN expanded operations to Latin America, beginning first with Mexico. In 2016, ACN expanded operations in Japan. By 2019, ACN was operating in 26 countries and five continents.

From 2006 until he announced his presidential candidacy in 2015, ACN had a business relationship with former The Apprentice executive producer Donald Trump. Trump spoke at ACN events, featured their products on an episode of The Apprentice, and took part in ACN promotional videos. Following the official beginning of his 2016 presidential candidacy, all references to Donald Trump were removed from the ACN website, and Trump distanced himself from the company in an interview with The Wall Street Journal. "I know nothing about the company other than the people who run the company," Trump told them. "I’m not familiar with what they do or how they go about doing it, and I make that clear in my speeches."

== Services ==
ACN offers landline telephone service (local and long distance), Voice over Internet Protocol (VoIP), high-speed Internet, satellite television, cellular phone through the company's own mobile virtual network operator (MVNO), Flash Wireless, and home security services, primarily to consumers, and secondarily to small businesses. Beginning in 2011, ACN also began offering an ACN-branded international calling smartphone app available for iPhone, Android and Symbian, reselling WiMAX wireless Internet, and technical support service for personal and business computers, as well as getting back into the energy reselling market through partner XOOM Energy.

With variations depending upon the country of operation, provision of ACN's services follows three models:

1. The reselling of ACN-branded services originating in an incumbent provider. This is exemplified by local and long-distance telephone, where ACN buys local telephone service from an incumbent provider such as Qwest or AT&T, and bills customers in its own name. This model was made possible by telephone industry deregulation beginning in 1996; prior to this, ACN was involved solely in reselling long-distance telephone service. It was the expansion of deregulation internationally that made it possible for ACN to begin to operate outside the United States.
2. Acting as a sales agent for the service provider, where an ACN representative sells the service, but order fulfillment, billing, and servicing is performed by the branded provider. In the US, ACN resells Internet service through AT&T. ACN offers wireless services through its own MVNO called Flash Wireless on Sprint and Verizon's networks. Television services are provided through DIRECTV and Dish Network. Home security and automation is offered through Vivint. ACN now also resells energy (electricity and natural gas) through Planet Energy and Xoom Energy.
3. The selling of ACN-branded and provided services. These are Voice over Internet Protocol in which ACN owns and maintains its own network of servers. Starting in January 2011, ACN has also added an ACN-branded computer technical support service to its service offerings.

== Legal cases ==
On June 13, 2002, ACN settled a case with the Bureau of Consumer Services in Pennsylvania wherein it was alleged that "independent business owners" (IBOs) were "slamming" or switching consumer services without authorization. ACN disputed the allegations and the exact details of the settlement are under court seal. However, the suit alleged that 135 informal complaints were filed with the Bureau of Consumer Services (BCS) between June 2000 and November 2001, consisting of 22 consumers alleging that their generation service was switched without authorization ("slamming"), 81 alleged instances of overcharging ("cramming"), and 32 complaints with allegations of various violations of the commission's regulations contained in Chapter 54, 56, and 57 of Title 52 of the Pennsylvania Code.

In August 2010, the Montana Commissioner of Securities and Insurance Monica Lindeen announced the issuance of a Cease-and-Desist Order and Notice of Proposed Agency Action against ACN, Inc. and several of its founders for operating a pyramid scheme. In September 2010, the Commissioner moved to vacate the Cease-and-Desist Order in full settlement of the case. During the Commissioner's investigation, the Commissioner determined that the actions giving rise to the initial concerns were not part of the ACN business model, but instead were isolated instances taking place by certain ACN's independent representatives in Montana. The Commissioner and ACN agreed that ACN would implement additional training with its independent representatives to assist them in better understanding their responsibilities as ACN independent representatives and that ACN would contact its Montana video phone customers to assist them with the installation of their service.

=== Doe et al. v. Trump Corp. et al. ===
In July 2019, a SDNY District Judge permitted state-level charges of fraud, false advertising, and unfair competition against Donald Trump and his children Donald Jr., Ivanka, and Eric related to their involvement with ACN. (The judge, however, dismissed racketeering (RICO) allegations against the family.) The Trumps are accused of not having disclosed that they were being paid by ACN when they recommended ACN as a sound investment. As part of the discovery process, the Trumps were ordered in March 2020 to provide information from Trump Organization business records for 15 years back to 2005. The Trumps sought to take the case to private arbitration, but the SDNY District Judge denied their request on April 8, 2020. On May 18, 2020, the District Court ruled against ACN and Donald Trump's motion for a Stay in the case. Trump had sought a stay during his term as President of the United States. The case was dismissed from federal court on January 12, 2024.
