= China Anne McClain discography =

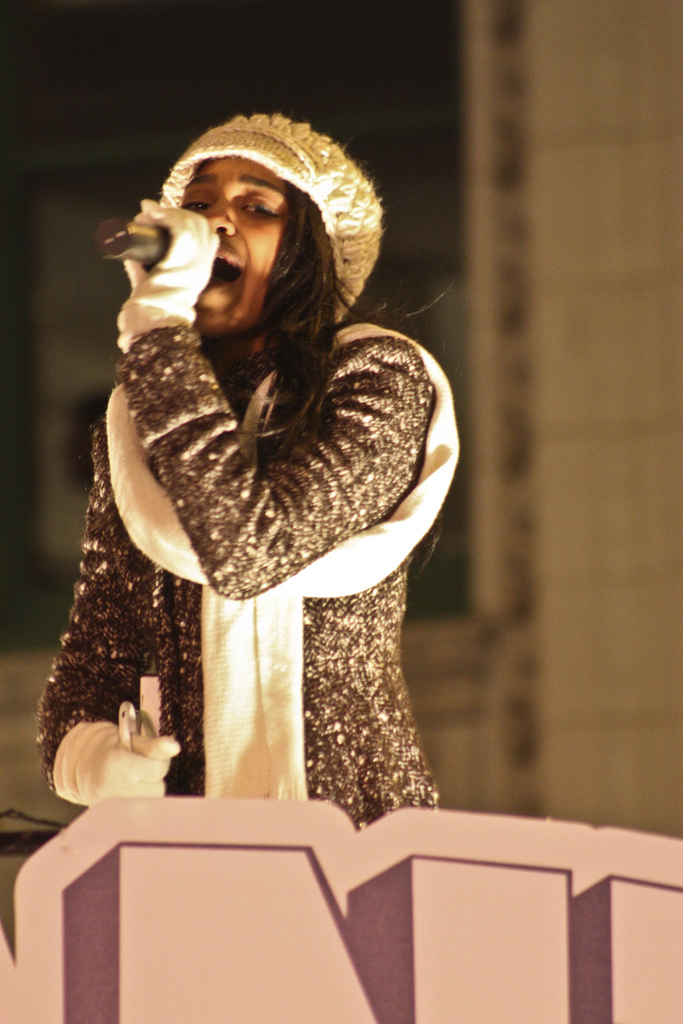
- McClain performing in 2011
- Soundtrack albums: 3
- Singles: 5
- Music videos: 5
- Promotional singles: 1

American singer and actress China Anne McClain has released three soundtrack albums, five singles, one promotional single, and four music videos. McClain appeared on the A.N.T. Farm soundtrack album in 2011, which was on the Billboard 200 at number 29, with songs such as Taio Cruz's "Dynamite" and "Calling All the Monsters". In 2014, McClain had released "Something Real", along with Kelli Berglund, the main single of the Disney Channel original movie How to Build a Better Boy.

== Albums ==
=== Soundtrack albums ===
List of albums, with selected chart positions
Title	Album details	Peak chart positions							Certifications
Title	Album details	US	US OST	AUS	BEL	FRA	NZ	SPA	Certifications
A.N.T. Farm	Released: October 11, 2011; Formats: CD, digital download; Label: Walt Disney	29	2	—	—	—	—	98	
Descendants 2	Released: July 21, 2017; Formats: CD, digital download; Label: Walt Disney	6	1	64	192	135	— (Note: Descendants 2 did not enter the NZ Top 40 Albums Chart, but peaked at number 6 on the NZ Heatseekers Albums Chart.)	53	RIAA: Gold
Descendants 3	Released: August 2, 2019; Formats: CD, Digital download; Label: Walt Disney	7	1	36	110	—	—	—	
"—" denotes releases that did not chart or were not released in that territory.

== Singles ==
=== As main artist ===
List of singles, with selected chart positions
Title	Year	Peak chart positions			Certifications	Album
Title	Year	US	CAN	UK	Certifications	Album
"Dynamite"	2011	—	—	—		A.N.T. Farm
"Calling All the Monsters"	2011	86	89	119	RIAA: Platinum	A.N.T. Farm
"What's My Name" (with Thomas Doherty and Dylan Playfair)	2017	61	94	39	RIAA: Platinum; BPI: Silver	Descendants 2
"Stronger" (with Dove Cameron)	2018	—	—	—		Non-album singles
"Young Guns" (featuring The Messenger)	2019	—	—	—		Non-album singles
"What's My Name? (Red Version)" (with Kylie Cantrall)	2024	—	—	—		Descendants: The Rise of Red (soundtrack)
"—" denotes releases that did not chart or were not released in that territory.

=== Promotional singles ===
List of singles
Title	Year	Album
"Something Real" (with Kelli Berglund)	2014	Non-album single

== Other charted songs ==
Title	Year	Peak chart positions	Certifications	Album
Title	Year	US	Certifications	Album
"It's Goin' Down" (among Descendants 2 cast)	2017	77	RIAA: Gold	Descendants 2
"Night Falls" (among Descendants 3 cast)	2019	84		Descendants 3

== Other appearances ==
Song	Year	Other artist(s)	Album
"Your Biggest Fan"	2009	Nick Jonas	Jonas L.A.
"I Got My Scream On"	2012	—N/a	Make Your Mark: Ultimate Playlist
"How Do I Get There from Here"	2012	—N/a	Make Your Mark: Ultimate Playlist
"Doc McStuffins Theme Song"	2013	—N/a	Doc McStuffins: The Doc Is In
"Dancin' by Myself"	2014	—N/a	Disney Channel Play It Loud
"DNA"	2014	—N/a	Disney Channel Play It Loud
"Night Is Young"	2015	—N/a	Descendants
"This Christmas"	2016	—N/a	Disney Channel Holiday Hits
"Poor Unfortunate Souls"	2017	—N/a	Descendants 2
"Dig A Little Deeper"	2019	—N/a	Descendants 3

== Music videos ==
Song	Year	Director
"Dynamite"	2011	James Larese
"Calling All the Monsters"	2011	Marc Klasfeld
"Something Real"	2014	Paul Hoen
"What's My Name"	2017	Kenny Ortega
"Stronger"	2018	Scott Rhea
