= Sasha Clements =

Canadian actress

- Born: Sasha Nicole Clements; March 13, 1990 (age 36); Ontario, Canada
- Education: York University
- Occupation: Actress
- Years active: 2005–present
- Known for: Majority Rules!
- Spouse: Corbin Bleu (m. 2016)
- Website: www.sashaclements.com

Sasha Nicole Clements (born March 13, 1990) is a Canadian actress. She is known for her role as Kiki Kincaid on the Teletoon sitcom Majority Rules!. She was cast in the 2005 fantasy The Snow Queen (2005). She also starred in the Disney Channel Original movie How to Build a Better Boy (2014), playing the role of Marnie.

== Early life ==
Clements was born in Ontario. Her mother is Anna Clements, and her father is actor Christopher Lee Clements, who was an actor on the Canadian musical drama series Catwalk. She has two younger brothers. Her great-grandmother is Russian Canadian. (Note: We all call her Babushka; (from Russian: ба́бушка).) She enrolled in York University.

== Career ==
Clements's first role was appearing alongside Juliet Stevenson in the BBC TV movie The Snow Queen (2005). In 2009, she won her first starring role in the Canadian Teletoon series Majority Rules!, playing 15-year-old Kiki Kincaid. and she guest starred in one episode of What's Up Warthogs! in 2010. She has had guest roles on television series such as Rookie Blue and Really Me (2011). Clements had a recurring role as Sarah on Lost Girl (2012). She guest starred as Emma in the premiere two episode of YTV's Life with Boys (2012). She then guest starred as Nikki in one episodes of Mudpit (2013).

In mid-2013, Clements began work on the Disney Channel Original Movie, How to Build a Better Boy (2014), alongside China Anne McClain and Kelli Berglund. The film is directed by Paul Hoen and premiered on August 15, 2014. In January 2015, Clements had a recurring role on the YTV and TeenNick series Open Heart as Rayna Sherazi. She guest starred as Cat in the premiere two episode of Canadian television series Degrassi: The Next Generation (2015). She also appeared in the 2015 Canadian television film based on the popular Degrassi series, Degrassi Don't Look Back (2015).

In February 2017, she had a supporting role in the drama film From Straight A's to XXX (2017), alongside Haley Pullos. That year she also appeared with the internet personality Manon Mathews in an episode of the series Incubator Gold Mine on the YouTube channel New Form. In 2019, she was cast in a co-starring role in the Jordan Barker film Witches in the Woods (2019), (Note: Also known as Stranded.) (Note: Filming took place from March 2018 in Sudbury, Ontario, Canada.) the project also stars Hannah Kasulka, and with her husband Corbin Bleu.

In July 2021, she was cast in the Hallmark Channel original entitled Love, for Real (2021), alongside Chloe Bridges, Camille Kostek and Corbin Bleu, directed by Maclain Nelson. In December 2021, She was cast for a Lifetime Christmas movie, titled A Christmas Dance Reunion (2021), directed by Brian Herzlinger. In 2022, she was cast in the comedy film Camp Hideout (2022), with Christopher Lloyd, and directed by Sean Olson. She guest starred as Wendy in the premiere one episode of HBO Max's Minx (2022). She then guest starred as Katya Miranova in one episodes of NCIS: Los Angeles (2022). In 2025, Clements was featured in the NBC series Suits LA (2025) in the episode "Acapulco", playing Tina Esposito.

In 2026, Clements was featured in the NBC series Brilliant Minds (2026) in the episode "The Rabbit Hole". She then guest starred as Lily Handley in one episodes of Murdoch Mysteries (2026) in the episode "Game Set, Murdoch". In July 2026, she was cast in the Lifetime original entitled The Night Everything Changed (2026), alongside Lara Amersey.

== Personal life ==
In 2011, Clements started dating High School Musical star Corbin Bleu. On October 15, 2014, Clements and Bleu announced their engagement. They later appeared on TLC reality series Say Yes to the Dress. They currently reside in Los Angeles. They married on July 23, 2016.

== Filmography ==
=== Film ===
Year	Title	Role	Notes	Ref.
2005	The Snow Queen	Robber Girl	TV movie	(Note: The film premiered on December 24, 2005 in United Kingdom.)
2014	How to Build a Better Boy	Marnie	Disney Channel Original Movie	
2015	Degrassi Don't Look Back	Cat	TV movie	
2017	From Straight A's to XXX	Jolie	TV movie	(Note: Also known as Straight A's.)
2019	Witches in the Woods	Alison	Filmed in 2018, released in 2019	
2021	Love, for Real	Candace	TV movie	(Note: Filming took place from 2021 in Hawaii.)
2021	A Christmas Dance Reunion	Marlee	TV movie	
2022	Camp Hideout	Receptionist	TV movie	(Note: Filming took place from 2022 in Franklin, Tennessee.)
2026	The Night Everything Changed	Ellie	TV movie	

=== Television ===
Year	Title	Role	Notes
2009–2010	Majority Rules!	Kiki Kincaid	Main role
2010	What's Up Warthogs!	Head cheerleader	1 episode
2011	Rookie Blue	Girl Passed Out	1 episode
2011	Really Me	Ramona	1 episode
2012	Lost Girl	Sarah	1 episode
2012	Life with Boys	Emma	2 episodes
2013	Mudpit	Nikki	1 episode
2015	Open Heart	Rayna Sherazi	3 episodes
2015	Degrassi: The Next Generation	Cat	2 episodes
2016	Say Yes to the Dress	Herself	1 episode
2022	Minx	Wendy	1 episode
2022	NCIS: Los Angeles	Katya Miranova	1 episode
2025	Suits LA	Tina Esposito	1 episode
2026	Brilliant Minds	Herself	1 episode
2026	Murdoch Mysteries	Lily Handley	1 episode

=== Web ===
Year	Title	Role	Channel	Notes
2017	Incubator Gold Mine	Desiree	New Form	Episode: "Anti-Social"

== See also ==
- List of notable Russian Canadians
