= NAACP Image Award for Outstanding Performance by a Youth (Series, Special, Television Movie or Limited-Series) =

American television award

This article lists the winners and nominees for the NAACP Image Award for Outstanding Performance by a Youth (Series, Special, Television Movie or Limited-series). The award was first given during the 1996 ceremony and called Outstanding Performance in a Youth/Children's Series or Special. It was later renamed to award performances by young performers in all types of shows. Since its conception, Raven-Symoné holds the record for the most wins with five.

== Winners and nominees ==
Winners are listed first and highlighted in bold.

=== 1990s ===
Year	Actor / Actress	Series	Ref
1995
1995	**LeVar Burton**	**Reading Rainbow**	
1996
1996	**Denzel Washington**	**Happily Ever After: Fairy Tales for Every Child**	
1996	Danny Glover	Happily Ever After: Fairy Tales for Every Child	
1996	Whoopi Goldberg	Happily Ever After: Fairy Tales for Every Child	
1996	James Earl Jones	Happily Ever After: Fairy Tales for Every Child	
1996	Sinbad	Happily Ever After: Fairy Tales for Every Child	
1997	—N/a		
1998
1998	**Denzel Washington**	**Happily Ever After: Fairy Tales for Every Child**	
1998	Avery Brooks	Happily Ever After: Fairy Tales for Every Child	
1998	LeVar Burton	Reading Rainbow	
1998	Ronald and Natalie Daise	Gullah Gullah Island	
1998	Chris Rock	Happily Ever After: Fairy Tales for Every Child	
1999
1999	**LeVar Burton**	**Reading Rainbow**	
1999	Bill Bellamy	Cousin Skeeter	
1999	Loretta Devine	One Day	
1999	Kirk Franklin and God's Property	One Day	
1999	Kel Mitchell	Kenan & Kel	
1999	Kenan Thompson	Kenan & Kel	

=== 2000s ===
Year	Actor / Actress	Series	Ref
2000
2000	**Lynn Whitfield**	**The Planet of Junior Brown**	
2000	Kevin Clash	The Adventures of Elmo in Grouchland	
2000	Marcella Lowery	City Guys	
2000	Kel Mitchell	Kenan & Kel	
2000	Kenan Thompson	Kenan & Kel	
2001
2001	**Bill Cosby**	**Little Bill**	
2001	LeVar Burton	Reading Rainbow	
2001	Ossie Davis	Finding Buck McHenry	
2001	Ruby Dee	Little Bill	
2001	Alfre Woodard	The Wishing Tree	
2002
2002	**LeVar Burton**	**Reading Rainbow**	
2002	Alvin Ailey American Dance Theater	Sesame Street	
2002	Tommy Davidson	The Proud Family	
2002	B.B. King	Sesame Street	
2002	Cree Summer	A Rugrats Kwanzaa Special	
2003
2003	**LeVar Burton**	**Reading Rainbow**	
2003	Tommy Davidson	The Proud Family	
2003	Jo Marie Payton	The Proud Family	
2003	Kyla Pratt	The Proud Family	
2003	Keshia Knight Pulliam	What About Your Friends: Weekend Getaway	
2004
2004	**Raven-Symoné**	**That's So Raven**	
2004	Tommy Davidson	The Proud Family	
2004	Kyla Pratt	The Proud Family	
2004	Cree Summer	All Grown Up!	
2004	Lynn Whitfield	The Cheetah Girls	
2005
2005	**Raven-Symoné**	**That's So Raven**	
2005	LeVar Burton	Reading Rainbow	
2005	Tommy Davidson	The Proud Family	
2005	Jo Marie Payton	The Proud Family	
2005	Kyla Pratt	The Proud Family	
2006
2006	**Raven-Symoné**	**That's So Raven**	
2006	Kevin Clash	Sesame Street	
2006	Tommy Davidson	The Proud Family Movie	
2006	Jo Marie Payton	The Proud Family Movie	
2006	Kyla Pratt	The Proud Family Movie	
2007
2007	**Raven-Symoné**	**That's So Raven**	
2007	Corbin Bleu	High School Musical	
2007	Kathleen Herles	Dora the Explorer	
2007	Kyle Massey	That's So Raven	
2007	Romeo Miller	Romeo!	
2008
2008	**Raven-Symoné**	**That's So Raven**	
2008	André Benjamin	Class of 3000	
2008	Kathleen Herles	Dora the Explorer	
2008	Lil' JJ	Just Jordan	
2008	Kyle Massey	Cory in the House	
2009
2009	**Keke Palmer**	**True Jackson, VP**	
2009	Selena Gomez	Wizards of Waverly Place	
2009	Lil' JJ	Just Jordan	
2009	Kyle Massey	Cory in the House	
2009	Caitlin Sanchez	Dora the Explorer	

=== 2010s ===
Year	Actor / Actress	Series	Ref
2010
2010	**Keke Palmer**	**True Jackson, VP**	
2010	Nick Cannon	Nickelodeon HALO Awards	
2010	Selena Gomez	Wizards of Waverly Place	
2010	LaShawn Jefferies	The Backyardigans	
2010	Caitlin Sanchez	Dora the Explorer	
2011
2011	**Keke Palmer**	**True Jackson, VP**	
2011	Nick Cannon	Nickelodeon HALO Awards	
2011	Selena Gomez	Wizards of Waverly Place	
2011	Victoria Justice	Victorious	
2011	Lance Robertson	Yo Gabba Gabba!	
2012
2012	**Keke Palmer**	**True Jackson, VP**	
2012	China Anne McClain	A.N.T. Farm	
2012	Lance Robertson	Yo Gabba Gabba!	
2012	Leon Thomas III	Victorious	
2012	Zendaya	Shake It Up	
2013
2013	**Loretta Devine**	**Doc McStuffins**	
2013	Nick Cannon	Nickelodeon HALO Awards	
2013	China Anne McClain	A.N.T. Farm	
2013	Keke Palmer	Winx Club	
2013	Tyler James Williams	Let It Shine	
2014
2014	**China Anne McClain**	**A.N.T. Farm**	
2014	Karan Brar	Jessie	
2014	Eric I. Keyes, III	Live Life and Win!	
2014	Fatima Ptacek	Dora the Explorer	
2014	Zendaya	Shake It Up	
2015
2015	**Fatima Ptacek**	**Dora and Friends: Into the City!**	
2015	Amber Frank	The Haunted Hathaways	
2015	Curtis Harris	The Haunted Hathaways	
2015	China Anne McClain	How to Build a Better Boy	
2015	Taliyah Whitaker	Wallykazam!	
2016
2016	**Marcus Scribner**	**Black-ish**	
2016	Miles Brown	Black-ish	
2016	Skai Jackson	Jessie	
2016	Marsai Martin	Black-ish	
2016	Hudson Yang	Fresh Off the Boat	
2017
2017	**Marsai Martin**	**Black-ish**	
2017	Miles Brown	Black-ish	
2017	Lonnie Chavis	This Is Us	
2017	E'myri Crutchfield	Roots	
2017	Hudson Yang	Fresh Off the Boat	
2018
2018	**Caleb McLaughlin**	**Stranger Things**	
2018	Ethan Hutchinson	Queen Sugar	
2018	Lonnie Chavis	This Is Us	
2018	Marsai Martin	Black-ish	
2018	Michael Rainey Jr.	Power	
2019
2019	**Marsai Martin**	**Black-ish**	
2019	Alex R. Hibbert	The Chi	
2019	Lonnie Chavis	This Is Us	
2019	Lyric Ross	This Is Us	
2019	Miles Brown	Black-ish	

=== 2020s ===
Year	Actor / Actress	Series	Ref
2020
2020	**Marsai Martin**	**Black-ish**	
2020	Miles Brown	Black-ish	
2020	Lonnie Chavis	This Is Us	
2020	Caleel Harris	When They See Us	
2020	Lyric Ross	This Is Us	
2021
2021	**Marsai Martin**	**Black-ish**	
2021	Miles Brown	Black-ish	
2021	Lexi Underwood	Little Fires Everywhere	
2021	Alex R. Hibbert	The Chi	
2021	Lyric Ross	This Is Us	
2022
2022	**Miles Brown**	**Black-ish**	
2022	Eris Baker	This Is Us	
2022	Alaya "That Girl Lay Lay" High	That Girl Lay Lay	
2022	Celina Smith	Annie Live!	
2022	Elisha 'EJ' Williams	The Wonder Years	
2023
2023	**Ja'Siah Young**	**Raising Dion**	
2023	Alaya High	That Girl Lay Lay	
2023	Cameron J. Wright	Family Reunion	
2023	Elisha Williams	The Wonder Years	
2023	Khali Spraggins	The Upshaws	
2024
2024	**Leah Sava Jeffries**	**Percy Jackson and the Olympians**	
2024	Alaya High	That Girl Lay Lay	
2024	Elisha “EJ” Williams	The Wonder Years	
2024	Jalyn Hall	The Crossover	
2024	Keivonn Woodard	The Last of Us	
2025
2025	**Leah Sava Jeffries**	**Percy Jackson and the Olympians**	
2025	Caleb Elijah	Cross	
2025	Graceyn Hollingsworth	Gracie's Corner	
2025	Melody Hurd	Cross	
2025	TJ Mixson	The Madness	
2026
2026	**Leah Sava Jeffries**	**Percy Jackson and the Olympians**	
2026	Amanda Christine	It: Welcome to Derry	
2026	Blake Cameron James	It: Welcome to Derry	
2026	Jeremiah Felder	The Residence	
2026	Percy Daggs IV	Paradise	

== Multiple wins and nominations ==
=== Wins ===
5 wins

- Raven-Symoné

4 wins

- LeVar Burton
- Marsai Martin
- Keke Palmer

3 wins

- Leah Sava Jeffries

2 wins

- Denzel Washington

=== Nominations ===
7 nominations

- LeVar Burton

6 nominations

- Miles Brown
- Marsai Martin

5 nominations

- Tommy Davidson
- Keke Palmer
- Raven-Symoné

4 nominations

- Lonnie Chavis
- China Anne McClain
- Kyla Pratt

3 nominations

- Nick Cannon
- Selena Gomez
- Alaya High
- Leah Sava Jeffries
- Kyle Massey
- Jo Marie Payton
- Lyric Ross
- Elisha “EJ” Williams

2 nominations

- Kevin Clash
- Loretta Devine
- Kathleen Herles
- Alex R. Hibbert
- Lil' JJ
- Kel Mitchell
- Fatima Ptacek
- Lance Robertson
- Caitlin Sanchez
- Cree Summer
- Kenan Thompson
- Denzel Washington
- Lynn Whitfield
- Zendaya
