= Blood Brother (2018 film) =

2018 film directed by John Pogue

- Film poster
- Directed by: John Pogue
- Written by: Michael Finch; Karl Gajdusek; Charles Murray
- Produced by: Michael Luisi
- Starring: Trey Songz; Jack Kesy; R-Truth; Fetty Wap; Hassan Johnson; China Anne McClain
- Cinematography: Matthew Irving
- Edited by: Lester Wilson
- Music by: Mark Kilian
- Production companies: WWE Studios; Codeblack Films
- Distributed by: Lionsgate
- Release date: November 30, 2018
- Running time: 85 minutes
- Country: United States
- Language: English

Blood Brother is an American action-thriller film directed by John Pogue and written by Michael Finch, Karl Gajdusek, and Charles Murray. The film stars Trey Songz.

== Premise ==
A recently released convict begins to take murderous revenge against his childhood friends, whom he believes let him take the fall for a crime they collectively committed. As the bodies start piling up, one of the friends Sonny (Trey Songz), now a police officer, will stop at nothing to put an end to the murderous rampage and to right the many wrongs of their tragically violent past.

== Cast ==
- Trey Songz as Sonny
- Jack Kesy as Jake Banning
- R-Truth as Blaine
- Fetty Wap as Emilio
- Hassan Johnson as Joe
- China Anne McClain as Darcy
- J. D. Williams as Kayvon

== Production ==
Blood Brother was originally titled Brother's Blood, and was announced in December 2015. Principal photography on the film began on January 13, 2016 in New Orleans. WWE Studios would be co-producing and co-financing the film under a deal with Lionsgate's CodeBlack Entertainment, with Michael Luisi producing for WWE.

== Reception ==
Blood Brother received mostly negative reviews from critics. Critics of the review aggregator site Rotten Tomatoes gave the film 17%, based on six reviews, receiving a 3.6/10 average rating. On Metacritic, Blood Brother's score is higher by 1%, holding it on 18%, based on 4 reviews, indicating "overwhelming dislike".

== See also ==
- List of hood films
