= Hassan Johnson =

American actor

- Born: November 19, 1976 (age 50); Brooklyn, New York, U.S.
- Other name: Hinikoj
- Occupation: Actor
- Years active: 1995–present
- Children: 1

Hassan "Iniko" Johnson (born November 19, 1976) is an American actor from Park Hill, Staten Island, New York. He portrayed Roland "Wee-Bey" Brice on HBO's The Wire and also starred as Drew Hill in Flatbush Misdemeanors on Showtime.

Hershal Pandya wrote for Vulture that Johnson's "niche is that of the gangster who pivots between being terrifying and baffling from line to line, and who delivers deeply silly lines with the untouchable swagger of someone whom no one in their life dares to question".

== Career ==
Johnson's first acting role was in the 1995 Spike Lee film Clockers. He also had a significant role in the motion picture In Too Deep, which was based on a true story. He also had a recurring role on ER as Darnell Thibeaux. Johnson has appeared in Brooklyn's Finest, Belly and The Devil's Own.

He owns a production company called Autumn Leaves, which he named after his daughter.

He has also appeared in Mýa's music video for "Fallen", Killarmy's music video "Fair, Love & War", The Roots' music video for "Break You Off", GZA's music video for "Knock Knock", Boyz n da Hood's "Dem Boyz", Obie Trice's music video for "Snitch", Jadakiss's music video "Time's up", Freeway's "What We Do?" music video alongside his fellow cast-members from The Wire, Jay-Z's music video for "Anything", 50 Cent's music video "Just a Lil Bit", the crime-drama web series "Dead Man's Trigger", and alongside DMX and Nas in the movie Belly. He was Jennifer Hudson's love interest in "No One Gonna Love You" video. Johnson also played a small role in Entourage as rapper Saigon's manager.

Most recently Johnson has appeared as the character Lorenzo on the CBS television show Person of Interest, and as the voice actor for Harold "Stretch" Joseph in the video game Grand Theft Auto V. He appeared in the 2018 WWE Studios film Blood Brother.

== Filmography ==
=== Film ===
Year	Title	Role	Notes
1995	Clockers	Skills	
1997	The Devil's Own	Teenager	
1998	Belly	Mark	
1999	In Too Deep	Latique	
1999	Black and White	Iniko	
2000	Amour Infinity	Silence	
2001	Prison Song	Jay	
2001	Sluggers	Chappy	Short
2002	Paid in Full	Accomplice	
2003	Marci X	Tinfoil	
2007	I Tried	KP	
2008	Who's Deal?	Clock	
2008	American Dream	Wisdom	
2009	Brooklyn's Finest	Beamer	
2009	Frankenhood	Marcellus	
2009	A Day in the Life	Mr. Fix It	
2009	Breathe	Jimmy	Short
2010	Gun	Clinton	
2010	The Blue Wall	Cloud	Short
2013	Newlyweeds	Two For Three	
2013	Once Upon a Time in Queens	Agent Butler	
2013	Bug	Derrick	Short
2014	An American in Hollywood	Paul	
2014	Top Five	Craig	
2015	Conjure	Bless	Short
2015	Ovum	Barnard	
2015	Staten Island Summer	Murray	
2016	Happy Baby	Marco	
2016	Guns and Grams	Freaky	
2017	Bobbi Kristina	Bobby Brown	TV movie
2017	Ms. Renaissance	Pierre Gardan	Short
2018	No Good Gang Girls	Los Muertos Member	Short
2018	A Talent for Trouble	Sean Wellington	
2018	Ladies Love Leo Littles: A Lesson in Chivalry	Leo Littles	
2018	Blood Brother	Joe	
2019	Standing Up, Falling Down	Aaron	
2020	Lethal Procedures	Ray Thornton	
2020	Equal Standard	Justice	
2020	Guns and Grams	Freaky	
2021	Better Than My Last	Damion Carter	TV movie
2022	Hunther	Charlie	
2023	Story Ave	Reggie	
2024	Marriage Mansion	Rich Harris	
2025	Zeke	Zeke	Short

=== Television ===
Year	Title	Role	Notes
1995–96	New York Undercover	Red/Ahmed	Episode: "Manchild" & "Toy Soldiers"
2001	NYPD Blue	Lenny Shelton	Episode: "Waking Up Is Hard to Do"
2001	Law & Order: Special Victims Unit	Junior	Episode: "Wrath"
2002	Law & Order	Arnold	Episode: "Access Nation"
2002–08	The Wire	Roland 'Wee-Bey' Brice	Recurring Cast: Season 1 & 4, Guest: Season 2-3 & 5
2004	Law & Order	Trevor Hawkins	Episode: "Gunplay"
2005–07	ER	Darnell Thibeaux	Recurring Cast: Season 11-12, Guest: Season 13
2006	Rescue Me	Cell Mate	Episode: "Chlamydia"
2006	Entourage	Bunky	Episode: "I Wanna Be Sedated"
2007	Numbers	Calvin Bradley	Episode: "End of Watch"
2008	Law & Order: Special Victims Unit	Rick Tyler	Episode: "Undercover"
2009	Dark Blue	Bobby Kilgore	Episode: "August"
2010	Cold Case	Robert Miggs '10	Episode: "Shattered"
2012	Dead Man's Trigger	Agent Patel	Main Cast
2012	The Good Wife	Gavin Wells	Episode: "Waiting for the Knock"
2013	Person of Interest	Lorenzo	Episode: "2 Pi R"
2014	The Blacklist	Pete Maguire	Episode: "Mako Tanida (No. 83)"
2016	Blue Bloods	Morgan Rutherford	Episode: "The Extra Mile"
2017	The Breaks	Detective Anthony Purdell	Recurring Cast
2018	Trappin'	Greedy	Episode: "Money Ain't a Thang"
2019	Tales	Dougie	Episode: "Deep Cover"
2019–20	The Last O.G.	Howard	Guest Cast: Season 2-3
2020	For Life	Bobby Latimer	Recurring Cast: Season 1, Guest: Season 2
2021-22	Flatbush Misdemeanors	Drew Hill	Main Cast
2022	This Fool	Davonte	Episode: "Putazos"
2025	Survival of the Thickest	Dr. Lawrence	Recurring Cast: Season 2

=== Music video ===
Year	Artist	Title	Role
2003	Mya	"Fallen"	Love Interest
2019	Jadakiss	"Me"	Bank Robber

=== Video Game ===
Year	Title	Role
2013	Grand Theft Auto V	Harold 'Stretch' Joseph
