= Dora (TV series) =

TV series reboot of Dora the Explorer for Paramount+

- Also known as: Dora: Say Hola to Adventure!
- Genre: Educational; Adventure; Comedy; Fantasy; Musical
- Created by: Chris Gifford; Valerie Walsh Valdes
- Based on: Dora the Explorer by: Chris Gifford; Valerie Walsh Valdes; Eric Weiner
- Developed by: Rich Magallanes; Chris Gifford; Valerie Walsh Valdes
- Directed by: Don Kim
- Voices of: see below
- Opening theme: "¡Exploradora!" performed by Joleen Belle, Joachim Svare, GG Ramirez, and Gabe Lopez
- Ending theme: "¡Exploradora! (Instrumental)"
- Composer: Bobby Villarreal
- Countries of origin: United States; Canada
- Original languages: English; Spanish
- No. of seasons: 4
- No. of episodes: 104

Production
- Executive producers: Chris Gifford; Valerie Walsh Valdes; Rich Magallanes; Luis Lopez; Henry Lenardin-Madden
- Producer: Julie Soebekti
- Editor: Alejandro Bien-Willner
- Running time: 11 minutes
- Production companies: Little Coop; Walsh Valdés Productions; Pipeline Studios (Note: Ontario-based animation studio.); Nickelodeon Animation Studio

Original release
- Network: Paramount+
- Release: April 12, 2024 – present

Related
- Dora the Explorer; Go, Diego, Go!; Dora and Friends: Into the City!

Dora, also known as Dora: Say Hola to Adventure!, is a children's animated television series created by Chris Gifford and Valerie Walsh Valdes for the streaming service Paramount+ that premiered on April 12, 2024. It is a reboot of the animated series Dora the Explorer (2000–2019), and the fourth series overall in the Dora the Explorer franchise.

12 days after its premiere, Paramount+ renewed the show for a second season, which premiered on September 13, 2024. The show made its linear television premiere on Nickelodeon on August 5, 2024. The third season was released on July 2, 2025, around the same time as the 2nd Dora the Explorer live-action film Dora and the Search for Sol Dorado. A special Dora & Diego: Rainforest Rescues was also released on the same day. The fourth season was released on December 19, 2025.

On November 12, 2025, it was announced that the series was cancelled alongside Tales of the Teenage Mutant Ninja Turtles stemming from management shifts caused by the Paramount-Skydance merger. The fourth season was released on December 19, 2025, and the fifth season was stated to be its final season. However, in June 2026, it was reported that Paramount had reversed its cancellation and that the series was renewed for a sixth season.

== Premise ==
A reboot of the original series, the series follows a series of all new adventures of the little Latina hero Dora and her monkey sidekick, Boots as they go on epic adventures in an whimsical rainforest. Accompanied by Dora's Map (depicted as a female in this series), Dora and her friends must work as a team to overcome many obstacles in the rainforest, including being challenged by Swiper.

== Characters ==
=== Main ===
- Dora Márquez (voiced by Diana Zermeño) is the titular main protagonist of the series. She is an 8-year old Latina girl.
- Boots (voiced by Asher Colton Spence) is Dora's anthropomorphic monkey best friend who is the co-host of the series.
- Swiper (voiced by Marc Weiner in Seasons 1–2, AJ Beckles in Season 3, Kevin Andrew Rivera in Season 4–present) is the main antagonist in the series like in the original series. He is an anthropomorphic orange fox who steals or attempts to steal key items that help Dora and Boots on their adventures. Weiner reprised his role from the original series for the first two seasons.
- Map (voiced by Anairis Quiñones) is a helpful talking map, who helps Dora and her friends on how they can get to their main place. Map's gender is changed from male to female for the reboot, and thus makes it the first time that Marc Weiner does not voice the character.
- Backpack (voiced by Katarina Sky) is Dora's talking backpack, who helps Dora on her adventures by holding things she needs.
- Grumpy Old Troll (voiced by Danny Burstein) is a yellow creature who lives under a bridge. When someone crosses the bridge (notably Dora and Boots), he tells them to solve a riddle to proceed to their destination. This series marks the first time that Chris Gifford does not voice the character.
- Tico (voiced by Donovan Monzon-Sanders in Seasons 1–2 and Logan J. Alarcon-Poucel in Season 3–present) is a 4-year-old Spanish-speaking anthropomorphic squirrel who is one of Dora and Boots' friends.
- Isa (voiced by Tandi Fomukong) is an anthropomorphic iguana who is smart and mature and is also one of Dora and Boots' friends.
- Benny (voiced by Quintún Muñoz) is an anthropomorphic bull who lives in a barn and is the loyal person of the group. He is also one of Dora and Boots' friends.
- Big Red Chicken (voiced by Chris Gifford in Seasons 1–2 and Eric Bauza in Seasons 3–4) is a large, anthropomorphic red chicken. Gifford reprised his role from the original series for the first two seasons.
- The Fiesta Trio (Frog and Marmoset voiced by Danny Burstein, Armadillo voiced by Anairis Quiñones) are a trio of small creatures who play instruments and are friends with Dora and Boots. A marmoset and an armadillo replace the grasshopper and snail from the original series, and the reboot marks the first time that Marc Weiner does not voice the trio.

=== Recurring ===
- Mami (voiced by Kathleen Herles) is Dora's mother. Herles was the original voice of Dora in the first four seasons of the original series, as well as all of Dora's speaking appearances in Go, Diego, Go!.
- Papi (voiced by Mike Smith Rivera) is Dora's father.
- Abuela (voiced by Maria Canals-Barrera) is Dora's grandmother.
- Ale the Alebrije (voiced by Kate del Castillo) is a colourful, magical jaguar.
- Isabella (voiced by Diana Zermeño) and Guillermo (voiced by Donovan Monzon-Sanders in Seasons 1–2 and Logan J. Alarcon-Poucel in Season 3–present) are Dora's younger twin sister and brother respectively.
- Val the Octopus (voiced by Elaine Del Valle) is an anthropomorphic octopus that occasionally helps Dora when she needs help. Del Valle reprises her role from the original series.

== Episodes ==
=== Series overview ===
Season	Episodes	Originally released
1	26	April 12, 2024
2	26	September 13, 2024
3	26	July 2, 2025
4	26	December 19, 2025

=== Season 1 (2024) ===
No. overall	No. in season	Title	Written by	Storyboarded by	Original release date	Nickelodeon air date	Prod. code	U.S. linear viewers (millions)
1	1	"Catch the Quickatoo"	Benjamin Weiner	Dermot Walshe	April 12, 2024	September 16, 2024	108	N/A
Dora and Boots have to locate a rare rainbow-colored large bird.
2	2	"Lost Lorito"	Valerie Walsh Valdes	Claudia Fuenzalida	April 12, 2024	September 20, 2024	109	N/A
Dora and Boots find a lost baby parrot who has the ability to copy whatever they do or say. They follow him all while helping him get back to his home along the way.
3	3	"Rainbow's Lost Colors"	Maggie Diaz Bofill	Frank Ramirez	April 12, 2024	September 23, 2024	110	N/A
When a rainbow is missing its colors, Dora's on the search for the colors in order to make the rainbow colorful again.
4	4	"Boots' Rubber Band Ball"	Emma Ramos	Steve Stefanelli	April 12, 2024	September 24, 2024	111	N/A
Boots loves his new rubber band ball until it hits right into the front yard that is home to a giant female centipede named Cynthia.
5	5	"The Alebrije Adventure"	Emma Ramos	Austen Payne, Troy Sullivan & Dermot Walshe	April 12, 2024	September 20, 2024	107	N/A
Dora and Boots help their new friend, Ale find the water that is the source of the alberjies' powers in order to retrieve their magic.
6	6	"Let's Get a Paleta!"	Toby Arguello	Somboun Souannhaphanh	April 12, 2024	September 20, 2024	112	N/A
Everyone's so excited to get paletas from Val the Octopus on a hot summer day until her frozen treat truck ends up in a flat tire.
7	7	"Big Red Chicken Wake Up!"	Alejandro Bien-Willner	Frank Ramirez	April 12, 2024	September 25, 2024	105	N/A
The Big Red Chicken is fast asleep on a drift, but when there's a waterfall heading towards him, Dora and Boots have to find a way to get him to wake up.
8	8	"The Mystery Gift"	Rebeca Delgado	John Flagg	April 12, 2024	September 26, 2024	106	N/A
Dora and Boots and their friends find colorful mystery boxes that contain riddles they need to solve from the Grumpy Old Troll.
9	9	"Friendaversary Adventure"	Jesenia Ruiz	Dermot Walshe	April 12, 2024	September 30, 2024	113	N/A
It's Friendship Day in the rainforest and Boots really wants to surprise his friend, Isa the Iguana, with a homemade vase he made just for her.
10	10	"Swiper's Birthday Surprise"	Toby Arguello	Al Jeffrey	April 12, 2024	October 1, 2024	114	N/A
It's Swiper's birthday today and there is a special surprise waiting for him, but luckily he cannot resist on trying to swipe it however.
11	11	"The Little Axolotl"	Rebeca Delgado	Frank Ramirez	April 12, 2024	September 18, 2024	115	N/A
Dora and Boots find a little axolotl and try to take him back to his mother.
12	12	"Bubble Trouble"	Sean Gill	Dan Nosella	April 12, 2024	September 19, 2024	116	N/A
Before a big show, Bip Bip and the Big Red Chicken end up floating away on a giant bubble. It's up to Dora and Boots to save them before the big show starts.
13	13	"Rainforest Ritmo"	Alejandro Bien-Willner, Rebeca Delgado & Toby Arguello	Dermot Walshe	April 12, 2024	August 5, 2024	103	N/A
Isa's having a dance party at the rainforest, but Boots cannot seem to get the correct parts of a new dance right. Dora teaches him how to do it all while the two go to the party.
14	14	"The Magic Nut"	Benjamin Weiner	Al Jeffrey	April 12, 2024	September 17, 2024	104	N/A
Dora and her friends find a magic nut that can grant any food-related wish, but Swiper's insisted on getting the nut himself by getting his swiping fox paws on it.
15	15	"Tiny Dancer"	Rebeca Delgado	Frank Ramirez	April 12, 2024	October 2, 2024	117	N/A
16	16	"The Sleepy Sun"	Heidi Lux & Nikki Taguilas	Dan Nosella	April 12, 2024	October 3, 2024	118	N/A
17	17	"Tres Leches Trouble"	Heidi Lux & Nikki Taguilas	Frank Ramirez	April 12, 2024	November 11, 2024	101	N/A
Benny has made a special cake for his abuela, so he needs Dora and Boots' help in taking it to her house.
18	18	"Wizzle Wozzle Woo"	Sean Gill	John Flagg	April 12, 2024	November 12, 2024	102	N/A
The Fiesta Trio have lost their instruments somewhere in an area where a strange sound is scaring them, which turns out to be the Big Red Chicken snoring across a bush.
19	19	"Croc-a-Bye Baby"	Alejandro Bien-Willner	Dermot Walshe	April 12, 2024	September 9, 2024	119	N/A
19	19	"Wanna Empanada?"	Alejandro Bien-Willner	Dermot Walshe	April 12, 2024	September 10, 2024	119	N/A
Three baby crocodiles would rather play all day than go to sleep, so Dora, Boots and their friends must do whatever they can to try to get them to nap. The Troll refuses to get an empanada because he never tried one. Dora and her friends show the Grumpy Old Troll that even empanadas can be so delicious to try.
20	20	"If the Boot Fits"	Alejandro Bien-Willner	Al Jeffrey	April 12, 2024	September 11, 2024	120	N/A
20	20	"Piñata Party"	Alejandro Bien-Willner	Al Jeffrey	April 12, 2024	September 12, 2024	120	N/A
With the help of Tico, Boots tries on different kinds of boots. Dora and her friends try to whack a pinata for Dora's younger twins' party.
21	21	"Tico and Bip Bip's Big Show"	Benjamin Weiner	Frank Ramirez	April 12, 2024	November 14, 2024	121	N/A
22	22	"Wonky Wishing Wand"	Heidi Lux & Nikki Taguilas	Dan Nosella	April 12, 2024	November 13, 2024	122	N/A
23	23	"A Guayabera For Tico"	Maggie Diaz Bofill	Frank Ramirez	April 12, 2024	November 4, 2024	123	N/A
24	24	"Falling Estrellas"	Jesenia Ruiz	Dan Nosella	April 12, 2024	November 5, 2024	124	N/A
25	25	"Crabby Boots"	Sean Gill	Austen Payne	April 12, 2024	November 6, 2024	125	N/A
A hermit crab accidentally takes one of Boots' boots, mistaking it for a shell.
26	26	"Papi's Picnic Party"	Rebeca Delgado	Claudia Fuenzalida	April 12, 2024	November 7, 2024	126	N/A
Dora's father is having a very special picnic and everyone in the rainforest is each bringing different kinds of foods.

=== Season 2 (2024) ===
No. overall	No. in season	Title	Written by	Storyboarded by	Original release date	Nickelodeon air date	Prod. code	U.S. linear viewers (millions)
27	1	"Big Big Boots"	Sean Gill	Dan Nosella	September 13, 2024	February 17, 2025	127	N/A
28	2	"Backpack's Sticky Situation"	Toby Arguello	Frank Ramirez	September 13, 2024	February 17, 2025	128	N/A
29	3	"A Piñata for Mami"	Alonso Cisneros	Frank Ramirez	September 13, 2024	February 18, 2025	129	N/A
30	4	"Invisi-Swiper"	Jesenia Ruiz	Dan Nosella	September 13, 2024	February 18, 2025	130	N/A
31	5	"Isa's Royal Garden Party"	Toby Arguello	Frank Ramirez	September 13, 2024	February 19, 2025	131	N/A
32	6	"Sammy's Surprise"	Benjamin Weiner	Austen Payne	September 13, 2024	February 20, 2025	132	N/A
33	7	"The Floor is Guava"	Sean Gill	Austen Payne	September 13, 2024	February 24, 2025	133	N/A
34	8	"We Are the Grumples"	Emma Ramos	Dan Nosella	September 13, 2024	February 25, 2025	134	N/A
The Grumpy Old Troll running away during the Rainforest's Picture Day leads to Dora and Boots journeying through the depths of his bridge, where they meet some small, fuzzy colorful trolls called "Grumples".
35	9	"Crabby Wedding"	Megan Gonzalez	Frank Ramirez	September 13, 2024	February 26, 2025	135	N/A
36	10	"The Cloud Kingdom"	Roxana Altamirano	Claudia Fuenzalida	September 13, 2024	February 27, 2025	136	N/A
37	11	"Partly Claudia"	Toby Arguello	Ted Collyer	September 13, 2024	July 11, 2025	137	N/A
38	12	"Ranita's Magic Stripes"	Jesenia Ruiz	Austen Payne	September 13, 2024	July 11, 2025	138	N/A
39	13	"Troll Jelly"	Sean Gill	Claudia Fuenzalida	September 13, 2024	July 18, 2025	139	N/A
40	14	"Catch That Kitty!"	Heidi Lux & Nikki Taguilas	Frank Ramirez	September 13, 2024	July 18, 2025	140	N/A
41	15	"Adventures in Plantsitting"	Talia Rothenberg	Austen Payne	September 13, 2024	July 25, 2025	141	N/A
42	16	"Andrea the Alebrije"	Megan Gonzalez	Ted Collyer & Troy Sullivan	September 13, 2024	July 25, 2025	142	N/A
43	17	"Rainforest Race"	Roxana Altamirano	Claudia Fuenzalida	September 13, 2024	August 1, 2025	143	N/A
44	18	"Bok Bok Birthday"	Sindy Boveda Spackman	Frank Ramirez	September 13, 2024	August 1, 2025	144	N/A
45	19	"Too Many Swipers"	Sean Gill	Austen Payne	September 13, 2024	August 8, 2025	145	N/A
46	20	"Bateo's Home Run"	Toby Arguello	Ted Collyer	September 13, 2024	August 8, 2025	146	N/A
47	21	"The Great Abuela Cook-Off"	Heidi Lux & Nikki Taguilas	Claudia Fuenzalida	September 13, 2024	August 15, 2025	147	N/A
48	22	"Missing Map"	Megan Gonzalez	Frank Ramirez	September 13, 2024	August 22, 2025	148	N/A
49	23	"Tongue Twisted Roll"	Roxana Altamirano	Austen Payne	September 13, 2024	August 29, 2025	149	N/A
50	24	"Chompy and the Cloud Flower"	Jesenia Ruiz	Ted Collyer	September 13, 2024	September 5, 2025	150	N/A
51	25	"Tío Tesoro's Treasure Hunt"	Danny Warren	Claudia Fuenzalida	September 13, 2024	September 19, 2025	151	N/A
52	26	"The Great Key Mystery"	Sindy Boveda Spackman	Frank Ramirez	September 13, 2024	September 26, 2025	152	N/A

=== Season 3 (2025) ===
No. overall	No. in season	Title	Written by	Storyboarded by	Original release date	Nickelodeon air date	Prod. code	U.S. linear viewers (millions)
53	1	"Ratoncito Perez"	Jesenia Ruiz	Austen Payne	July 2, 2025	TBA	TBA	N/A
Dora and Boots help Ratoncito the tooth fairy mouse get his magic toothbrush fixed so Dora can get a reward from him once her loose tooth gets retrieved.
54	2	"The Berry Hungry Caterpillar"	Megan Gonzalez	Frank Ramirez	July 2, 2025	TBA	TBA	N/A
55	3	"Unicornasaurus"	Toby Arguello	Troy Sullivan	July 2, 2025	TBA	TBA	N/A
56	4	"The Grumple Games"	Sean Gill	Steve Stefanelli	July 2, 2025	TBA	TBA	N/A
57	5	"Little Dora's Big Adventure"	Sindy Bodeva Spackman	Austen Payne	July 2, 2025	TBA	TBA	N/A
58	6	"Bye Bye Balloon"	Jesenia Ruiz	Frank Ramirez	July 2, 2025	TBA	TBA	N/A
59	7	"Singin' in the Tub"	Danny Warren	Ted Collyer	July 2, 2025	TBA	TBA	N/A
60	8	"Show and Share"	Alejandro Bien-Willner	Rachel Peters & Steve Stefanelli	July 2, 2025	TBA	TBA	N/A
61	9	"Dora's Birthday Surprise"	Sean Gill	Austen Payne	July 2, 2025	August 15, 2025	TBA	N/A
62	10	"Moonlight Fiesta"	Toby Arguello	Frank Ramirez	July 2, 2025	August 15, 2025	TBA	N/A
63	11	"Halloween's Been Swiped"	Jesenia Ruiz	Rachel Peters	July 2, 2025	October 10, 2025	TBA	N/A
64	12	"The Pumpkin Party Mystery"	Megan Gonzalez	Ted Collyer	July 2, 2025	October 10, 2025	TBA	N/A
65	13	"Learning to Fly"	Roxana Altamirano	Frank Ramirez	July 2, 2025	TBA	TBA	N/A
66	14	"Queen Swiper"	Sindy Bodeva Spackman	Austen Payne	July 2, 2025	TBA	TBA	N/A
67	15	"The Bunny Boyz"	Sean Gill	Rachel Peters	July 2, 2025	TBA	TBA	N/A
68	16	"Dancing Osito"	Jana Petrosini	Ted Collyer	July 2, 2025	TBA	TBA	N/A
69	17	"A Dog for Dora"	Jesenia Ruiz	Austen Payne	July 2, 2025	TBA	TBA	N/A
70	18	"Super Pozole"	Angela Sanchez	Frank Ramirez	July 2, 2025	TBA	TBA	N/A
71	19	"Dora Saves Christmas"	Megan Gonzalez	Rachel Peters	July 2, 2025	November 28, 2025	TBA	N/A
72	20	"Return to Snowy Mountain"	Sean Gill	Ted Collyer	July 2, 2025	November 28, 2025	TBA	N/A
73	21	"Dora's Song for Papi"	Holly Gregory	Austen Payne	July 2, 2025	TBA	TBA	N/A
74	22	"Pirate Piggies"	Toby Arguello	Frank Ramirez	July 2, 2025	TBA	TBA	N/A
75	23	"Abuela's Quinceañera"	Maggy Torres-Rodriguez	Rachel Peters	July 2, 2025	TBA	TBA	N/A
76	24	"Story Time"	Alejandro Bien-Willner	Ted Collyer	July 2, 2025	TBA	TBA	N/A
77	25	"Run Cynthia Run"	Jesenia Ruiz	Austen Payne	July 2, 2025	TBA	TBA	N/A
78	26	"Dora in Space"	Megan Gonzalez	Frank Ramirez	July 2, 2025	TBA	TBA	N/A

=== Season 4 (2025) ===
No. overall	No. in season	Title	Written by	Storyboarded by	Original release date	Nick Jr. Channel air date	Prod. code	U.S. linear viewers (millions)
79	1	"Backpack's Charm"	Kris Marvin Hughes	Ted Collyer	December 19, 2025	October 5, 2026	TBA	N/A
Dora and Boots help Backpack find her lost friendship charm and make it even better than before.
80	2	"Lost Banana Blankie"	Sean Gill	Steve Stefanelli	December 19, 2025	October 5, 2026	TBA	N/A
Dora helps Boots find his lost banana blankie before it's bedtime at the sleepover party.
81	3	"Mito Dreams of La Playa"	Toby Arguello	Austen Payne	December 19, 2025	October 5, 2026	TBA	N/A
Dora helps her friend Mito the Yeti see the beach for the first time and he even wins the sandcastle competition.
82	4	"Snake Bike"	Nick Lopez	Frank Ramirez	December 19, 2025	October 5, 2026	TBA	N/A
On her way to the new bike park, Dora teaches Selena the Snake how to ride a bicycle.
83	5	"Captain Dora"	Megan Gonzalez	Kirk Jorgensen	December 19, 2025	October 6, 2026	TBA	N/A
Dora and Boots track down the Pirate Piggies' ship and save it from a kraken.
84	6	"Bruno and the Bunny Boyz"	Jesenia Ruiz	Ted Collyer	December 19, 2025	October 6, 2026	TBA	N/A
Dora and Boots help Bruno the Bunny find his own special dance moves in time to perform with his favorite band, the Bunny Boyz.
85	7	"The Missing Magical Instruments"	Roxana Altamirano	Austen Payne	December 19, 2025	October 6, 2026	TBA	N/A
Dora, Boots, and Vicky the Vicuña track down missing magic instruments to save Cloud Kingdom.
86	8	"Mr. Banana's Big Puppet Show"	Toby Arguello	Frank Ramirez	December 19, 2025	October 6, 2026	TBA	N/A
Dora rescues Boots' special banana puppet before the Golden Monkeys can get to it.
87	9	"Dora and Diego Rescue Baby Jaguar"	Sean Gill	Kirk Jorgensen	December 19, 2025	TBA	TBA	N/A
Dora, Boots, and Diego rescue a baby jaguar after it gets lost deep in the rainforest.
88	10	"Diego's Awesome Owl Adventure"	Alejandro Bien-Willner	Ted Collyer	December 19, 2025	TBA	TBA	N/A
Dora, Boots, and Diego help a baby burrowing owl find its parents and make it home.
89	11	"Dora and Diego and the Big Boy Bears!"	Jesenia Ruiz	Austen Payne	December 19, 2025	TBA	TBA	N/A
Dora, Boots, and Diego help a pair of spectacled bear brothers build an awesome nest for their Mami.
90	12	"Journey to Lizard Island"	Megan Gonzalez	Frank Ramirez	December 19, 2025	TBA	TBA	N/A
Dora, Boots, and Diego help a lost, baby lizard get home to its parents.
91	13	"The Secret Pyramid"	Toby Arguello	Kirk Jorgensen	December 19, 2025	October 7, 2026	TBA	N/A
Dora, Boots, and Mami search for magical gems and a secret pyramid with their new friend, Patli.
92	14	"Abuela Adventure Day"	Maggy Torres-Rodriguez	Ted Collyer	December 19, 2025	October 7, 2026	TBA	N/A
Dora and friends save their Abuelas in time to celebrate Abuela Adventure Day.
93	15	"Mascota Mobile"	Sean Gill	Austen Payne	December 19, 2025	October 7, 2026	TBA	N/A
Dora is about to give her pets a bath when the pet-washing truck goes haywire, and she has to save pets throughout the rainforest.
94	16	"Kite Festival"	Jana Petrosini	Frank Ramirez	December 19, 2025	October 7, 2026	TBA	N/A
Dora and Boots save a mouse in time for him to show off his giant kite at the Rainforest Kite Festival.
95	17	"Dora's Mermaid Adventure"	Alejandro Bien-Willner	Kirk Jorgensen	December 19, 2025	October 8, 2026	TBA	N/A
Dora and Boots become mermaids and help Marisol the Mermaid save her home, Sirena Sea.
96	18	"Mermazing Surprise!"	Jesenia Ruiz	Ted Collyer	December 19, 2025	October 8, 2026	TBA	N/A
Dora and Boots go across the sea to help their dolphin friend find the best gift ever, a magic jewel.
97	19	"Octo-Swiper"	Sean Gill	Austen Payne	December 19, 2025	October 8, 2026	TBA	N/A
Dora stops a frantic octopus Swiper and saves the Pearl Day Party.
98	20	"Todos Juntos"	Toby Arguello	Frank Ramirez	December 19, 2025	October 8, 2026	TBA	N/A
Dora meets Raquel the Rock Lobster and helps her get the missing instruments back in time to play at the big music show.
99	21	"Volleybull!"	Sindy Bodeva-Spackman	Kirk Jorgensen	December 19, 2025	October 9, 2026	TBA	N/A
Dora and Boots help Benny perfect a new move in time for the championship volleyball game.
100	22	"Diferente es Excelente"	Alejandro Bien-Willner	Ted Collyer	December 19, 2025	October 9, 2026	TBA	N/A
Dora and Boots run into Dulce the dragon on her way to the first day of school and show her that everyone's differences are what make them excellent.
101	23	"Gaucho Games"	Toby Arguello	Austen Payne	December 19, 2025	October 9, 2026	TBA	N/A
Dora and Boots help their friend Catalina the Condor become an amazing Gaucha and save the Gaucho Games.
102	24	"Princesa Dora"	Jesenia Ruiz	Frank Ramirez	December 19, 2025	October 9, 2026	TBA	N/A
Dora and Boots meet Pilar the Princess Unicorn and help her get back to Unicorn Land.
103	25	"Side-Swiped"	Sean Gill	Kirk Jorgensen	December 19, 2025	TBA	TBA	N/A
Dora and Boots run into Swiper and his nephew Zorrito. They must make it home before Swiper and Zorrito can swipe their teddy bear.
104	26	"Quest for the Blue Bananas"	Megan Gonzalez	Ted Collyer	December 19, 2025	TBA	TBA	N/A
Dora meets Boots' cousin, Sombrera, and they journey across the rainforest to find the special blue bananas.

== Production ==
The series' counterpart was announced and revealed in 2021 by Brian Robbins at the ViacomCBS' Investors Day Event. The series was ordered by Paramount+ and was originally set to premiere in 2023, but was delayed to 2024.

The dialogue is recorded at Burbank-based Atlas Oceanic Sound and Picture and New York City-based Hyperbolic Audio. The series is a collaboration between Nickelodeon Animation Studio and Ontario-based Pipeline Studios.

The series is executive-produced by Rich Magallanes, Chris Gifford, Valerie Walsh Valdes, and Luis Lopez, while Henry Lenardin-Madden serves as a co-executive, and Alejandro Bien-Willner serves as the editor to the series. Marielle Kaar also serves as the executive in charge of production for the series.

=== Release ===
Prior to the series' official release date, some episodes were made available on the franchise's official YouTube channel on September 30, 2023.

The series premiered on April 12, 2024 (with the first season of 26 episodes), exclusively on Paramount+ in the United States, Canada, the United Kingdom and Australia. The series also aired on the Nick Jr. Channel internationally.

In Canada, the series premiered on Treehouse TV on October 4, 2024.

In South Korea, the series airs on tvN.

== Merchandise ==
In addition to being released on Paramount+, the show also includes a toy line from Spin Master to promote the series unlike its original counterpart.

== See also ==
- Dora and the Fantastical Creatures - A 2023 theatrical animated short film serving as a pilot to the Dora series.
