= Dora's Party Favorites =

Dora the Explorer Party Favorites

Soundtrack album by Dora the Explorer
- Released: September 8, 2008
- Recorded: May 21, 2008 in Davie, Florida
- Genre: Children's Music
- Length: 39:52
- Label: Sony BMG
- Producers: Joel Someillan, George Noriega

Dora the Explorer chronology
!Vamos a bailar! Let's Dance! The Dora the Explorer Music Collection (2008)	Dora the Explorer Party Favorites (2008)	Dora's Christmas (2009)

Professional ratings
Review scores
Source	Rating
Common Sense Media	4/5 stars

Dora the Explorer Party Favorites, also known as Dora the Explorer Party Favorites, is a compilation of classic children's songs sung by Dora the Explorer (Caitlin Sanchez). It includes a remix of Dora's theme song. The CD also comes with a "Pin the Boots on Boots" game.

== Track listing ==
No.	Title	Length
1.	"Dora the Explorer Party Mix (including "Dora the Explorer Theme" & "Travel Song")"	2:10
2.	"The Wheels on the Bus"	2:45
3.	"Old MacDonald Had a Farm"	3:44
4.	"Mary Had a Little Lamb"	2:49
5.	"B-I-N-G-O"	2:46
6.	"Here We Go Round the Mulberry Bush"	2:26
7.	"Itsy Bitsy Spider"	2:07
8.	"Travel Song (Reprise)"	1:09
9.	"Row, Row, Row Your Boat"	2:51
10.	"London Bridge"	2:01
11.	"I'm a Little Teapot"	2:04
12.	"Twinkle, Twinkle Little Star"	2:20
13.	"The Hokey Pokey"	3:02
14.	"If You're Happy and You Know It"	2:44
15.	"The Chicken Dance"	2:27
16.	"Happy Birthday/Cumpleaños Feliz"	2:28

== Special features ==
- Includes a "Pin the Boots on Boots!" game.
