= Kathleen Herles =

American voice actress (born 1990)

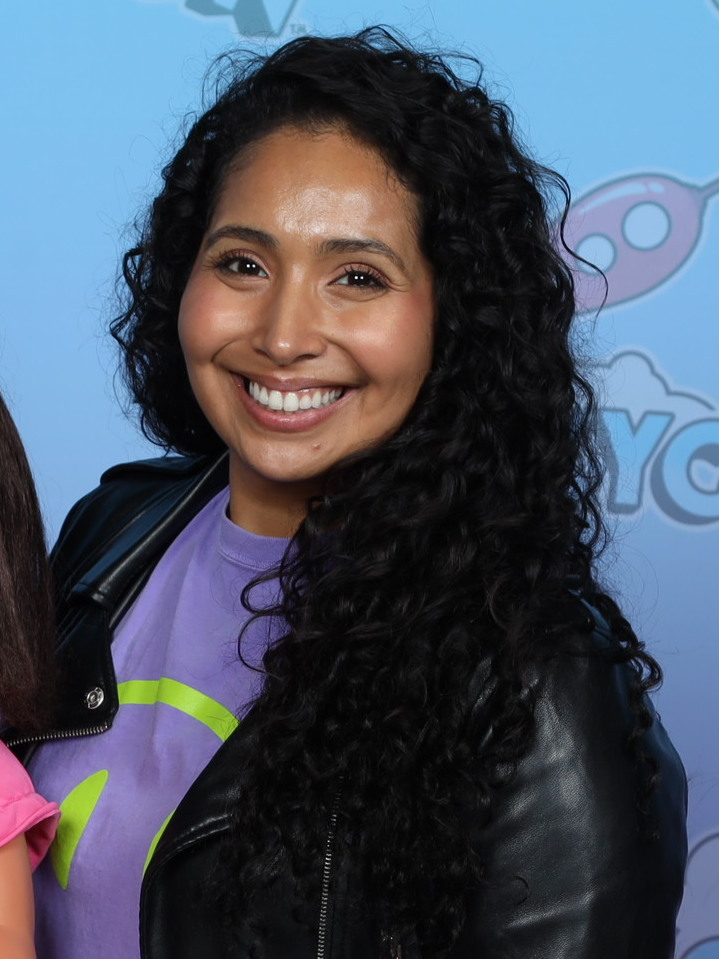
- Herles at GalaxyCon Columbus in 2023
- Born: November 13, 1990 (age 35); Queens, New York, U.S.
- Occupation: Voice actress
- Years active: 1997–present
- Known for: Original voice of Dora the Explorer
- Spouse: Reginald Ledan (m. 2019)

Kathleen Herles (born November 13, 1990) is an American voice actress best known for being the original voice of Dora on Dora the Explorer for the first four seasons.

== Career ==
Herles was born in the Queens borough of New York City to Peruvian parents. She has studied ballet, tap, jazz, drama, and voice acting. Herles was discovered by talent manager Shirley Grant of Shirley Grant Management at a talent and modeling convention when she was four years old.

In 2007, Herles retired from voicing Dora to attend college at Pace University and was replaced by Caitlin Sanchez and Fatima Ptacek. However, her voice for the character was used in various media until 2009.

Herles graduated from Pace University in 2012.

== Awards and nominations ==
In 2007, Herles was nominated for an Imagen Award for Best Television Actress.

She was nominated in 2007 and 2008 for an NAACP Image Award for NAACP Image Award for Outstanding Performance in a Youth/Children's Series or Special.

== Filmography ==
=== Television ===
Year	Title	Role	Notes
2000–07; 2019	Dora the Explorer	Dora Márquez, additional voices	102 episodes
2005–07; 2009	Go, Diego, Go!	Dora Márquez, additional voices	7 episodes
2016	Dora and Friends: Into the City!	Camp Counselor	Episode: "Kate and Quackers"
2024–	Dora	Mami	

=== Video games ===
Year	Title	Role
2002	Dora the Explorer 3D Driving Adventure	Dora
2002	Dora the Explorer 3D Backpack Adventure	Dora
2002	Dora the Explorer: Backpack Adventure	Dora
2002	Dora the Explorer: Lost City Adventure	Dora
2005	Dora the Explorer: Dance to the Rescue	Dora
2005	Dora the Explorer: Journey to the Purple Planet	Dora
2006	Dora the Explorer: Dora's World Adventure	Dora
2007	Dora the Explorer: Dora Saves the Mermaids	Dora
