= Heels (TV series) =

2021 American drama television series

- Season 1 promotional poster
- Genre: Drama
- Created by: Michael Waldron
- Starring: Stephen Amell; Alexander Ludwig; Alison Luff; Mary McCormack; Kelli Berglund; Allen Maldonado; James Harrison; Roxton Garcia; Chris Bauer; Robby Ramos; Trey Tucker
- Theme music composer: Jeff Cardoni; Ben Bridwell
- Opening theme: "Love in War" by Ben Bridwell
- Composer: Jeff Cardoni
- Country of origin: United States
- Original language: English
- No. of seasons: 2
- No. of episodes: 16

Production
- Executive producers: Kyle Patrick Alvarez; Eli Jorné; Rodney Barnes; Christopher Donnelly; Michael Waldron; Patrick Walmsley; Pete Segal; Rick Yorn; Julie Yorn; Mike O'Malley
- Producer: Bill Hill
- Production location: Georgia
- Editor: Jason Gourson
- Running time: 57–62 minutes
- Production companies: O'Malley Ink; Cool Dog; LBI Entertainment; Paramount Television Studios; Lionsgate Television

Original release
- Network: Starz
- Release: August 15, 2021 – September 15, 2023

Heels is an American drama television series about professional wrestling created by Michael Waldron that premiered on August 15, 2021, on Starz. In November 2021, the series was renewed for a second season, which premiered on July 28, 2023. In September 2023, the series was cancelled after two seasons.

== Premise ==
Two brothers and rivals, one a villain, or "heel" in professional wrestling, the other a hero, or "face", play out scripted matches as they war over their late father's wrestling promotion and vie for national attention in small town Georgia.

== Cast ==
=== Main ===
- Stephen Amell as Jack Spade, a "heel" in the Duffy Wrestling League (DWL), Ace's older brother, and the proprietor of the DWL.
  - Jaxon McHan as Young Jack Spade
- Alexander Ludwig as Ace Spade, a "face" in the DWL and Jack's younger brother.
  - Mason Gillette as Young Ace Spade
- Alison Luff as Staci Spade, Jack's wife.
- Mary McCormack as Willie Day, Jack's business partner.
- Kelli Berglund as Crystal Tyler, Ace's valet who aspires to become a wrestler.
- Allen Maldonado as Deandre "Rooster Robbins" Milton, a star DWL wrestler.
- James Harrison as Apocalypse (season 1), an experienced, disillusioned journeyman wrestler.
- Roxton Garcia as Thomas Spade, Jack and Staci Spade's son.
- Chris Bauer as Wild Bill Hancock, a former wrestling star turned pro wrestling scout.
- Robby Ramos as Diego Cottonmouth (season 2; recurring season 1), an experienced wrestler who acts as a "heel" in the ring and wears a luchador mask.
- Trey Tucker as Bobby Pin (season 2; recurring season 1), a rookie wrestler who acts as a "face" in the ring and a supportive colleague in the locker room.

=== Recurring ===
- Mike O'Malley as Charlie Gully, the owner and impresario of Florida Wrestling Dystopia (FWD), a new wrestling promotion more interested in violent spectacle than telling a compelling story.
- David James Elliott as Tom "King" Spade, Jack and Ace's father, a former wrestler who was the proprietor of the DWL. The character appears in flashbacks, having committed suicide about a year before the events of the series.
- Alice Barrett Mitchell as Carol Spade, Jack and Ace's mother.
- Duke Davis Roberts as "Big" Jim Kitchen, a seasoned wrestler and Ace's best friend.
- Erica Pappas as Melanie Kitchen (season 1; guest season 2), Jim's wife.
- Marcia DeBonis as Debbie
- CM Punk as Ricky Rabies, a journeyman pro wrestler.
- Danielle Gross as Courtney
- Larry Clarke as Ted Day, Willie's husband.
- Joel Murray as Eddie Earl
- Eliza Coyle as Annie Earl
- Scott Hunter as The Dad
- Brian Scannell as Paul Gully, Charlie's brother.
- Fiona O'Malley as Lucy Gully (season 2; guest season 1), Charlie's daughter.
- AJ Lee as Elle Dorado (season 2)
- Josh Segarra as Brooks Rizzo (season 2)
- Emmy Raver-Lampman as Jennifer Lussier (season 2)

=== Guest ===
- Jef Holbrook as Todd (season 1), the host of a YouTube show critical of DWL.
- Christian Adam as Gabe (season 1)
- Bonnie Somerville as Vicky Rabies (season 1), Ricky's valet.
- Mick Foley as Dick Valentino (season 1), a retired wrestler turned podcaster who interviews Jack Spade about the DWL.

== Production ==
=== Development ===
On February 17, 2017, it was announced that Starz had given straight-to-series order to Michael Waldron's series. Production companies involved with the series are Paramount Television and LBI Entertainment. On January 7, 2020, Peter Segal replaced Kyle Patrick Alvarez to direct the series. On May 2, 2021, Starz announced the series would premiere on August 15, 2021. On November 3, 2021, Starz renewed the series for a second season. On an episode of Michael Rosenbaum's "Inside of You" podcast released on January 3, 2023, Stephen Amell mentioned that filming of the second season wrapped in July 2022, but no further information was available regarding a trailer or release date. In May 2023, Starz announced the second season would premiere on July 28, 2023.

=== Casting ===
On August 19, 2019, Stephen Amell was cast as Jack Spade. On September 15, 2019, Alexander Ludwig was cast as Ace Spade. On January 7, 2020, Alison Luff was cast as Staci Spade. On March 11, 2020, Chris Bauer, Allen Maldonado, James Harrison, and Kelli Berglund joined the cast. On August 25, 2020, Mary McCormack was cast as Willie, Jack's business partner.

== Episodes ==
=== Series overview ===
Season	Episodes	Originally released	
Season	Episodes	First released	Last released
1	8	August 15, 2021	October 10, 2021
2	8	July 28, 2023	September 15, 2023

=== Season 1 (2021) ===
No. overall	No. in season	Title	Directed by	Written by	Original release date	U.S. viewers (millions)
1	1	"Kayfabe"	Pete Segal	Michael Waldron	August 15, 2021	0.128
Jack Spade, the owner of the Duffy Wrestling League in Duffy, Georgia, controls everything inside the wrestling ring, but outside "The Dome", he fights to balance his family, his 'real' job, competition from a bloody wrestling promotion. Plus his little brother Ace, who is the new face of the DWL, is interested in bigger organizations, causing former wrestler-turned-scout Wild Bill Hancock to show an interest. Jack's refusal to drop the DWL Championship to Ace in their upcoming match, feeling that him retaining is a better storyline, causes further dissension between the brothers. Jack betrays Ace during the match by beating him within seconds, causing Ace to break down in tears as the fans shower the ring with trash.
2	2	"Dusty Finish"	Pete Segal	Michael Waldron	August 22, 2021	0.103
As the DWL wrestlers worry about the fallout from the previous promotion, Jack struggles with what direction to take the narrative in and his league, causing interest from his competition, Charlie Gully from the Florida Wrestling Dystopia (FWD) to buy The Dome. Meanwhile, Ace is out of control and wants to quit wrestling after the 'crying' match in what he thinks is an end to his career, and goes on a bender in town. After Jack fights alongside Ace in a bar fight, Ace agrees to return to DWL but states he does not want to ever again get booed by fans.
3	3	"Cheap Heat"	Jessica Lowrey	Bradley Paul	August 29, 2021	0.094
In an event to drum up more heat for DWL, Jack enlists the help of popular wrestling veteran Ricky Rabies. He intends to set up Ace with a full house for his comeback in the main event with newcomer Bobby Pin. Meanwhile, Rooster Rollins is questioning his worth in DWL with a championship belt, and so is Jack's wife, Staci, who wants to get away from all the wrestling drama. After the DWL fans reject Ace's attempt to rehabilitate his character, he finally agrees to turn heel.
4	4	"Cutting Promos"	Jessica Lowrey	Daria Polatin	September 5, 2021	0.079
After a house fire forces Jack and his family to move in with Carol and Ace, the two brothers put their differences aside and their heads together to generate a DWL promo to further grow the league's fan base outside Georgia. After exposing himself on an airplane and then verbally attacking his bosses in a drunken rant posted online, Wild Bill is fired from his scouting job and has nowhere to go but back home to Duffy. Meanwhile, Crystal helps Bobby Pin find a new wrestling identity.
5	5	"Swerve"	Pete Segal	Rachel Sydney Alter	September 12, 2021	0.079
When chair members of the South Georgia State Fair shows interest in featuring the DWL as this year's main attraction, it's on Jack to close the deal with an electric night of matches. However, Wild Bill, Ace and Crystal, who is no longer a "valet", have their own ideas at the expense of Bobby Pin's career.
6	6	"House Show"	Pete Segal	Eli Jorné	September 19, 2021	0.093
Everyone in town is getting ready for the DWL's premiere at the South Georgia State Fair, especially Jack who's running around prepping and promoting to sell 10,000 tickets. However, not all goes well on a podcast with former wrestler Dick Valentine (Mick Foley) who asked too many personal questions about his father, Tom "King" Spade's death. Meanwhile, 'god-daddy' Ace makes a heart-felt speech at Big Jim's baby's baptism, making him question his character with the people he's been hurting like Crystal and Bobby Pin who has a broken leg and can't wrestle thanks to him. Also, Rooster meets with Gully to discuss a contract in the FWD.
7	7	"The Big Bad Fish Man"	Pete Segal	Rodney Barnes	October 3, 2021	0.073
With only two weeks left to the main event at the South Georgia State Fair, Jack is doing all that he can to keep his remaining wrestlers healthy and his family happy. In order to get more "bodies" in the DWL, he holds an open tryout, which Crystal sees as her opportunity to get rid of her valet status and become a real wrestler. Gully sets a trap to poach Ace by vandalizing The Dome, causing him to go to Gully's mansion in Jacksonville and defend the Spade name. Staci suspects that Jack played a role in Ace unexpectedly turning heel. After hearing about Ace's decision, Jack pays the FWD a little visit.
8	8	"Double Turn"	Pete Segal	Eric Martin	October 10, 2021	0.081
It's time for the DWL's main event at the fair, however, there's more on the line than the championship belt. Jack's marriage is in jeopardy after Staci finds out he plotted Ace's Kleenex incident, and fears Jack's heel character is true to life. Gully wants payback and plans to sabotage the championship ladder match, unless the Spade Brothers beat him to it. Crystal is back in the DWL by becoming Bill's valet, Bunny Bombshell, but it's not for long because she has to prove herself as a real wrestler when after Gully and his people turn the crowd and Ace and Jack begin trading blows for real, Jack tells her to claim the belt for herself. Conflict still brewing between the Spade Brothers, Ace walks away, seemingly becoming comfortable in his role as a heel.

=== Season 2 (2023) ===
No. overall	No. in season	Title	Directed by	Written by	Original release date	U.S. viewers (millions)
9	1	"Ten-Bell Salute"	Pete Segal	Mike O'Malley	July 28, 2023	0.046
"Ten-Bell Salute" resumes directly after the season 1 finale. Ace storms out of the arena before anyone can calm him down. However, due to the successful State Fair show, the general locker room vibe stays positive. Gully promises to get revenge on Jack for attacking him. The season 2 premiere primarily connects the present with the past. Tom Spade's funeral is shown in a series of flashbacks and highlights of how his suicide affected those closest to him. Jack is so torn that he refuses even to read his farewell letter. Ace is even worse off as he is shattered by the feeling of not living up to Tom's expectations.
10	2	"The Journey is the Obstacle"	Pete Segal	Mike O'Malley	August 4, 2023	0.029
News of the DWL's successful South Georgia State Fair show has been getting around and other people want a piece of the pie. Willie and the DWL owe a lot of people a lot of money. Meanwhile, the DWL has yet to receive its check from the State Fair people. Jack, meanwhile, seems oblivious to the aforementioned financial predicament. With Jack still having to deal with Staci and their separation, the two meet with officials at Thomas' school. They realize that they still have a lot of work to do to restore things and there are no imminent plans for her and Thomas to return home. Jack decides to strip Crystal of the DWL title, but does make her an active member of the DWL roster. At Willie's suggestion, Crystal begins training with the male wrestlers to build up her ring experience and endurance. Crystal wins the title back in a ladder match with Jack and Wild Bill. Ace heads West to begin what he hopes will be a spiritual awakening, which has mixed results. Watching the ladder match while camping, Ace is left in peril in the woods after falling from a cliff.
11	3	"Discord"	Michael Lehmann	Victor Levin	August 11, 2023	0.032
Jack goes on the road to find Ace; the DWL has been left in the hands of Willie. Gully comes to town with an offer to work together that the DWL can't refuse given a threatened lawsuit. Crystal continues training for her new role as a wrestler and begins a romantic relationship with Bobby. Ace is rescued from his fall off a cliff. Back at his hotel room he propositions the women who saved him for a threesome. Ace was turned down and eventually Jack showed up at his door. Confiding his doubts and confessing his faults, Jack reaffirms Ace of his importance. Following a national news report on domestic violence among professional athletes, Willie changes course and begins plans to start developing a women's division with Crystal. Staci moves back home. Ace, having forgiven Jack, returns to Duffy and moves in with Jack and Staci.
12	4	"Heavy Heads"	Michael Lehmann	Blake Masters	August 18, 2023	0.038
After working out with Aisha, known as 'Elle Dorado', Crystal begins to doubt her wrestling ability. Wild Bill and Diego attend a wrestling fan convention where they meet some of Bill's old competitors. It's time for the next DWL show, which features an appearance from the feral fan-favorite Ricky Rabies. However, the big match on the card is Crystal vs. Elle Dorado, which launches the company's new women's division. Prior to the match, it's announced that the bout will be for the DWL Women's Championship. Crystal wins the match, after which Staci witnesses Willie handing over cash to the county auditor. Prior to the main event tag team match, Rooster appears and shoots on the promotion. After the tag match is over, Rooster and another wrestler from Florida Wrestling Dystopia enter the ring and attack Ricky. However, the hostile invasion is interrupted by a mysterious figure in a black hood who clears the ring and says, "I come to you a damned soul in search of redemption. I will break free. I will not stop until my redemption is obtained. I, The Condamned." Ace is back with a new style, wrestling as 'The Condamned'.
13	5	"Who the Hell is the Condamned?"	Pete Segal	Bryce Ahart & Stephanie McFarlane	August 25, 2023	0.026
Ace's new Condamned gimmick was very popular with the crowd and most of the wrestlers were surprised. However, Diego and Gully were upset they did not know of it. Rooster talks Gully out of killing the Condamned gimmick after which FWD receives an offer to stream their promotion on Continuum, a national web platform. Crystal visits her Mom in prison. Staci and Willie argue about how bills are paid for the DWL. The decision is made for Ace to appear and Crystal to wrestle on the Dystopia show. Crystal impresses the executive from Continuum there scouting the FWD show. Her match ends early and she is surrounded by the FWD roster. As part of the angle, Gulley offers her a job with the FWD. Jack interrupts and Crystal turns on him, hitting him with a chair. Jack is surrounded by the FWD roster before the Condamned saves him. The lights go out and the FWD roster is laying in the ring. The Continuum executive is shown asking Willie about Ace and Jack.
14	6	"Appearances"	Pete Segal	Mike O'Malley & Victoria Morrow & Blake Masters	September 1, 2023	0.056
The angle with Crystal turning on Jack and the DWL gains notoriety with her being praised as a star and Diego feeling left out. Jack, Ace and Staci have a potentially life-changing meeting with the Continuum corporation. Willie and Wild Bill think back on an exciting time in the DWL's infancy, when a young Tom Spade faced a similar opportunity with a meeting with Ted Turner. Tom became upset when Ted Turner rescheduled the meeting after Tom had been waiting. Wild Bill talks to the DWL roster about how they can succeed. Gulley offers Willie a job with Dystopia and wants Crystal to work for them legitimately. A young Tom was again forced to wait for a meeting with Ted Turner and storms out of his office, rejecting any potential deal. He then causes a rift with Bill by taking Willie to be his valet. The flashbacks continue where it is discovered that a now successful Bill has loaned Tom over $460,000 to keep the DWL afloat. Tom helps Bill with a script for an acting job just before killing himself.
15	7	"The Things That Matter"	Jessica Lowrey	Victoria Morrow	September 8, 2023	0.049
Willie argues with her family. Wild Bill continues his wrestling lessons with the DWL crew. Ace takes a job at a nursing home as he begins to believe the Condamned's mythology. Continuum executives plan to travel from California to meet again with both the DWL and Dystopia with the leagues taking different approaches to hosting them. Dystopia throws a wild party which wows the Continuum boss. Bobby receives bad medical news. Staci continues didgging into the Dome and DWL's archives and business history and realizes the dire financial straits that they are actually in. The DWL group screens the presentation they made for Continuum, exciting everyone for the future. Staci makes Jack aware of the financial and legal issues that may affect the DWL's future.
16	8	"High Flying"	Jessica Lowrey	Victoria Morrow	September 15, 2023	0.040
Staci meets with a lawyer friend to discuss the DWL's issues. The Continuum executives discuss signing both the DWL and Dystopia and making them work together. Gulley visits Willie at her house to discuss her and Crystal working for Dystopia. Wilie shows Staci more of the behind-the-scenes maneuverings that Tom used to help the DWL. The night of Harmageddon, the cross-promotion event between the DWL and Dystopia, comes. Can Jack and Ace forgive each other and right their wrongs? Or will it all fall apart in the ring yet again? Jack is tense before the show as he discusses the future with Ace and Wild Bill. Rooster faces off with the Condamned in the main event, a Last Man Standing Match. Rooster is conflicted with finishing off the Condamned with a baseball bat. Rooster and Crystal turn on Dystopia, before Jack turns on the DWL and the match morphs into a match between him and The Condamned. Jack and The Condamned brawl all over the Dome. Jack hurts himself on the finishing Shooting Star Press and they flip the script and have The Condamned get up to win the match. Jack can't feel his legs after the match, apparently paralyzing himself on the finishing move.

== Release ==
Heels debuted on Starz on August 15, 2021, and the season 1 finale aired on October 10, 2021. Heels season 2 debuted on Starz on July 28, 2023, and the season 2 finale aired on September 15, 2023. In April 2024 Netflix announced it acquired the show from Starz. Netflix started showing reruns of both seasons on its streaming service September 15. Netflix also announced the possibility of a third season being produced if the reruns are widely viewed.

== Reception ==
Heels has been met with a positive response from critics. On Rotten Tomatoes, the first season has an approval rating of 96% based on reviews from 26 critics, with an average rating of 8/10. The critics consensus reads, "Stephen Amell and Alexander Ludwig sell hard in Heels, an impressive new drama that has compelling angles on both sides of the rope." On Metacritic, the first season has a weighted average score of 73 out of 100 based on reviews from 12 critics, indicating "generally favorable reviews".

On Rotten Tomatoes, the second season has an approval rating of 90% based on reviews from 10 critics, with an average rating of 7.8/10. The critics consensus reads, "There are no jobbers in Heels' second season, which utilizes the full breadth of its ensemble to show-stopping effect." On Metacritic, the second season has a weighted average score of 79 out of 100 based on reviews from 6 critics, indicating "generally favorable reviews".

== See also ==
- GLOW
- Sanctuary, a Japanese show with a similar premise involving wrestling as the main focus.
