= Sing Your Face Off =

American television show

- Genre: Reality competition
- Based on: Your Face Sounds Familiar
- Presented by: John Barrowman
- Judges: Debbie Gibson; Darrell Hammond; See Guest Judges
- Country of origin: United States
- Original language: English
- No. of seasons: 1
- No. of episodes: 6

Production
- Executive producer: Georgie Hurford-Jones
- Camera setup: Multiple camera
- Production company: Endemol USA

Original release
- Network: ABC
- Release: May 31 – June 14, 2014

Sing Your Face Off is a reality singing series that was aired on ABC during the 2013–14 American television season. It was based on both the Endemol format Your Face Sounds Familiar and an adaptation of the Spanish "Tu cara me suena," the latter of whose title translated as "Your face is familiar to me." The first season consisted of six episodes, with two episodes airing back-to-back over three weeks. The first season premiered on May 31, 2014, and concluded on June 14, 2014. No plans were known to have been formed for a second season. Actress and singer China Anne McClain won the first and only season.

== Premise ==
In the context of the program's celebrity-oriented premise, for such a celebrity to "sing one's face off" meant to sing live, but also to do so as part of an impersonation of a prominent recording artist. (The Legends In Concert productions were organized along a similar premise, featuring "tribute artists" who looked and sounded like those to whom they paid tribute.)

The premise of the show had the celebrities spin the "face finder wheel" at the end of the previous show to determine as which artist they would sing their faces off, with the exception of week 1 when the celebrities were given their artist. They then spent the week practicing the song along with any other necessary practicing such as playing an instrument, choreography, etc. that went along with the performance. They also spent that week getting any necessary make-up formats, outfits, accessories, or such that they needed to look like the artist as whom they would perform.

They then performed the songs, as the artist, and were given an individual score by each of the judges. This score was ranged on a scale from 1 to 10, and the maximum possible total was 30 points. At the end of all the performances, the celebrities were each given the chance to give an extra three points to any one of the other celebrities. The judges' scores and the extra points given by the celebrities were then added together to determine the winner for each night's episodes.

The celebrities' rankings on the scoreboard at the end of that week determined the order in which the celebrities then spun the "face finder wheel" to determine the artist as whom they would perform the following week.
At the end of four weeks, the celebrity with the lowest combined scores of all their four performances was eliminated from the competition.

From Week 4 on, at the end of the week, the celebrity with the lowest total score for that week was eliminated until the list of celebrities was narrowed down to a list of "Final 3" performers. The Final 3 performers then performed one more time; after that performance, the judges voted on who they believed should be crowned the winner of Sing Your Face Off; the celebrity then needed two votes out of the three from the judges to win.

== Cast ==
=== Contestants ===
Celebrity	Notability (known for)
Sebastian Bach	Skid Row lead singer
Landry Fields	NBA small forward
Jon Lovitz	Comedian & actor
China Anne McClain	Actress and McClain lead singer
Lisa Rinna	Actress & television host

=== Judges ===
Debbie Gibson and Darrell Hammond acted as judges on every episode, while the third judge varied with each episode.

=== Guest judges ===
Week	Celebrity	Notability (known for)
1	David Alan Grier	Film, television & Broadway actor
2	RuPaul	Television host & drag queen
3	Carnie Wilson	Wilson Phillips singer
4	Richard Simmons	Fitness entrepreneur
5	Tom Arnold	Comedic movie actor
6	Carmen Electra	Film & television actress

== Performances ==
Celebrity	Week 1	Week 2	Week 3	Week 4	Week 5	Week 6
China Anne McClain	Rihanna	Tina Turner	Michael Jackson	Alicia Keys	James Brown	Whitney Houston
Lisa Rinna	Dolly Parton	Britney Spears	Katy Perry	Justin Bieber	Cyndi Lauper	Madonna
Landry Fields	Lionel Richie	Pitbull	Enrique Iglesias	Nicki Minaj	MC Hammer	Little Richard
Jon Lovitz	Elton John	Luciano Pavarotti	Billy Idol	Meat Loaf	Roy Orbison	Redfoo (Special Performance)
Sebastian Bach	Adam Levine	Lady Gaga	Willie Nelson	Freddie Mercury	---	Sky Blu (Special Performance)

== Overall scores ==
Red numbers indicate the singer whose score was lowest for that week.
Green numbers indicate the singer whose score was highest for that week.
indicates an eliminated singer.
indicates an eliminated singer who was eliminated by Judges Choice.
indicates the winning singer.
indicates the runner-up singer.
indicates the third-place singer.

Singer	Place	1	2	3	4	1+2+3+4	5	6
China Anne McClain	1	34	28	35	71	168	36	2^{1}
Landry Fields	2	28	28	31	58	145	31	0^{2}
Lisa Rinna	2	24	32	28	70	154	31	0^{2}
Jon Lovitz	4	24	38	31	47	140	30	
Sebastian Bach	5	30	26	28	56	140		

1. Rather than give scores out of 30 for the contestants's performances, the judges each voted for who they thought deserved to win Sing Your Face Off. The celebrity then needed two out of three votes in order to win Sing Your Face Off.
2. Since both Darrell Hammond and Debbie Gibson voted for China Anne McClain to win, China had the majority of the votes to win Sing Your Face Off, and Carmen Electra's vote was thus never revealed, leaving both Lisa Rinna and Landry Fields as runners-up.

== Weekly scores and songs ==
=== Week 1 ===
Running order

Celebrity	Score	Extra Points	Music
Jon Lovitz	24 (9, 8, 7)	0	"Bennie and the Jets"-Elton John
Landry Fields	25 (9, 8, 8)	3 (Lisa)	"Dancing on the Ceiling"-Lionel Richie
China Anne McClain	28 (10, 9, 9)	6 (Sebastian and Jon)	"Diamonds"-Rihanna
Sebastian Bach	24 (9, 7, 8)	6 (China and Landry)	"Moves like Jagger"-Maroon 5 ft. Christina Aguilera
Lisa Rinna	24 (9, 8, 7)	0	"9 to 5"-Dolly Parton

=== Week 2 ===
Running order

Celebrity	Score	Extra Points	Music
China Anne McClain	28 (9, 9, 10)	0	"Proud Mary"-Tina Turner
Lisa Rinna	26 (8, 9, 9)	6 (Jon and Landry)	"...Baby One More Time"-Britney Spears
Jon Lovitz	29 (10, 10, 9)	9 (China, Lisa, and Sebastian)	"La donna è mobile"-Luciano Pavarotti
Landry Fields	28 (9, 9, 10)	0	"I Know You Want Me (Calle Ocho)"-Pitbull
Sebastian Bach	26 (9, 9, 8)	0	"Bad Romance"-Lady Gaga

=== Week 3 ===
Running order

Celebrity	Score	Extra Points	Music
Landry Fields	25 (8, 8, 9)	6 (China and Jon)	"Hero"-Enrique Iglesias
Lisa Rinna	28 (9, 9, 10)	0	"Hot N Cold"-Katy Perry
China Anne McClain	29 (10, 9, 10)	6 (Landry and Lisa)	"Rockin' Robin"-Michael Jackson
Sebastian Bach	28 (9, 10, 9)	0	"Always on My Mind"-Willie Nelson
Jon Lovitz	28 (9, 9, 10)	3 (Sebastian)	"Rebel Yell"-Billy Idol

=== Week 4 ===
Running order

Celebrity	Score	Extra Points	Music
Sebastian Bach	50 (17, 16, 17)	6 (Jon)	"We Are the Champions"-Queen
Landry Fields	58 (19, 19, 20)	0	"Starships"-Nicki Minaj
Jon Lovitz	47 (16, 15, 16)	0	"I'd Do Anything for Love (But I Won't Do That)"-Meat Loaf
Lisa Rinna	58 (20, 19, 19)	12 (Landry and China)	"Baby"-Justin Bieber
China Anne McClain	59 (20, 19, 20)	12 (Sebastian and Lisa)	"Girl on Fire"-Alicia Keys

- Week 4 was a "Double Points" week, where the judges individually scored each singer out of a 20 instead of the previous 10 and the celebrities could give another celebrity 6 extra points rather than the previous 3.

=== Week 5 ===
Running order

Celebrity	Score	Extra Points	Music
China Anne McClain	30 (10, 10, 10)	6 (Lisa and Landry)	"Living in America"-James Brown
Lisa Rinna	28 (9, 10, 9)	3 (Jon)	"Girls Just Want to Have Fun"-Cyndi Lauper
Jon Lovitz	30 (10, 10, 10)	0	"Oh, Pretty Woman"-Roy Orbison
Landry Fields	28 (9, 10, 9)	3 (China)	"U Can't Touch This"-MC Hammer

=== Week 6 ===
Running order

Celebrity	Number of Judges Votes to Win	Music
Lisa Rinna	0	"Material Girl"-Madonna
Landry Fields	0	"Tutti Frutti"-Little Richard
China Anne McClain	2 (Darrell and Debbie)	"The Greatest Love of All"-Whitney Houston
Special Performances		Music
Jon Lovitz & Sebastian Bach		"Sexy and I Know It" -LMFAO
Debbie Gibson & Darrell Hammond		"I Got You Babe"-Sonny & Cher

== Revival possibilities ==
In June 2014, Debbie Gibson, one of the judges, lent her support to efforts to renew Sing Your Face Off for a second season. However, ABC has not announced any plans for a second season.
