= Majority Rules! =

Canadian teen comedy drama series

- Genre: Comedy-drama; Teen drama
- Created by: Wilson Coneybeare
- Written by: Wilson Coneybeare
- Directed by: Craig Pryce
- Creative director: Greg Lawrence
- Starring: Tracy Spiridakos; Jenny Raven; Sasha Clements; Dalmar Abuzeid; Madison Cassaday; Wesley Morgan; Jackie Richardson; Shauna MacDonald
- Opening theme: "On Our Own" by Shiloh
- Composers: Christian Szczesniak (22 episodes); David Krystal (21 episodes)
- Country of origin: Canada
- Original language: English
- No. of episodes: 26

Production
- Executive producers: John Morayniss; Frank Saperstein
- Producer: Chris Danton
- Production company: E1 Entertainment

Original release
- Network: Teletoon
- Release: September 10, 2009 – March 4, 2010

Majority Rules! is a Canadian teen comedy drama series which first aired on Teletoon in 2009. The series is also dubbed Votez Becky! for the French title.

== Airing ==
The production company Entertainment One (at the time called E1 Entertainment) began filming for the first (and only) season on January 12, 2009. The show had the distinction of being the first near live-action regular program on Teletoon, an animation channel. Majority Rules! aired in the United States on Starz Kids & Family, starting in November 2013.

== Synopsis ==
The series revolves around Rebecca "Becky" Richards (Tracy Spiridakos), a fifteen-year-old whose life is changed when she is elected mayor of her hometown of Mayfield. Even with the pressures of her extremely irregular life she manages to still have a smile on her face with the help of her friends Margo Dubois (Jenny Raven) and Kiki Kincaid (Sasha Clements).

== Cast ==
=== Main ===
- Tracy Spiridakos as Becky Richards
- Jenny Raven as Margo Dubois
- Sasha Clements as Kiki Kincaid
- Dalmar Abuzeid as Jarmin
- Madison Cassaday as Mo
- Wesley Morgan as Jack Braddock

=== Recurring ===
- Jackie Richardson as Mrs. DeMarco
- Shauna MacDonald as Alana Richards

== Episodes ==
- Go Girl!
- There's Something Rotten in Mayfield
- Day One
- A Promising Start
- Just Deserts
- Great Eggs-pectations
- Becky Knows Best
- Me & My Big Ideas
- A Tiny Glitch
- Filibuster Club
- Becky for a Day
- Never Say Sorry
- Pranked
- Pageant Blues
- Becky Takes a Pass
- Art Show
- Opposites Detract
- Lost in the Woods
- Boo Who?
- Boo Who, Too
- G is for Gavel
- Strange Bedfellows
- Me & My Shadow
- Temporary Insanity
- A Day in the Life
- A Stitch in Time
