= Alison Luff =

American actress and singer (born 1988)

- Born: December 20, 1988 (age 37); Spring, Texas
- Education: Klein Collins High School
- Occupations: Actress; singer
- Spouse: Matthew Magnusson
- Children: 1

Alison Nicole Luff (born December 20, 1988) is an American actress and singer known for her work in musical theatre, including as Elphaba in the First National Tour of Wicked and in Broadway roles such as Miss Honey in Matilda and Anne Hathaway in & Juliet. From 2021 to 2023, she has appeared in a lead role in the Starz drama series Heels.

Her other Broadway credits include Ghost the Musical, Les Misérables, Escape to Margaritaville, Waitress, and The Who's Tommy.

== Early life and education ==
Luff was born on December 20, 1988, in Spring, Texas. Her interest in theater began in childhood. At age 6, she began singing and dancing with Encore Youth Performers. One year later, she began acting in community theater, and at age 10, she began acting in professional theater. She attended Klein Collins High School in Harris County, Texas, performing in her school's theater productions. As Éponine in the school's production of Les Miserables, she was nominated for best actress at the Tommy Tune Awards, and as Annabel Glick in its production of Lucky Stiff, she won best actress at an awards ceremony at the Hobby Center for the Performing Arts. She then she worked and performed to save money to move to New York City.

== Career ==
She made her Broadway debut in the ensemble of Mamma Mia, understudying the roles of Ali and Sophie. She left the production on January 1, 2012 and joined the show's national tour. She then understudied the role of Aimee Semple McPherson in the short-lived Broadway musical, Scandalous. She next understudied Molly in the Broadway production of Ghost, having the opportunity to go on in the role.

Luff starred in Wicked in the first US national tour as Elphaba from April 30, 2013 until April 20, 2014. She played Miss Honey in the Broadway production of Matilda from September 6, 2014, to September 6, 2015. She originated the role of Charlie Jane at the Pasadena Playhouse in Breaking Through, remaining until the show closed on November 22, 2015.

She returned to Broadway as Fantine in Les Misérables from February 2016 until the revival closed in September 2016. Luff created the role of Rachel in the pre-Broadway tour of Escape to Margaritaville, which ran from October 20 to December 2, 2017, and continued in the role in the Broadway production from March 15 to July 1, 2018. She also starred as Jenna in Waitress on Broadway from July 23, 2019, to September 15, 2019.

Luff played Mrs. Walker in The Who's Tommy at the Goodman Theatre in Chicago in 2023, and continued in the role during the Broadway revival from March 28, 2024 to July 21, 2024. In October 2024, Luff began playing Anne Hathaway in the Broadway production of & Juliet.

Film/TV Credits
Production	Role	Year	Notes
Les Misérables: The Broadway Musical	Ensemble	2014	Broadway production filmed live
FBI	Sam Chapman	2019	Episode: "Identity Crisis"
New Amsterdam	Alice Healy	2020	Six episodes
Heels	Staci Spade	2021–2023	16 episodes
Power Book II: Ghost	Detective Felicia Lewis	2024	5 episodes
