= How to Build a Better Boy =

2014 television film directed by Paul Hoen

- Promotional poster
- Genre: Comedy; Romance; Science fiction Teen
- Written by: Jason Mayland
- Directed by: Paul Hoen
- Starring: China Anne McClain; Kelli Berglund; Marshall Williams
- Theme music composer: Kenneth Burgomaster
- Country of origin: United States
- Original language: English

Production
- Producers: Adam Kossack; Robin Schorr; Dan Seligman
- Cinematography: David A. Makin
- Editor: Don Brochu
- Running time: 109 minutes
- Production companies: Princessa Productions, Ltd. Schorr Pictures

Original release
- Network: Disney Channel
- Release: August 15, 2014

How to Build a Better Boy is a 2014 American sci-fi teen romantic comedy film released as a Disney Channel Original Movie. It is directed by Paul Hoen and written by Jason Mayland. It stars China Anne McClain, Kelli Berglund and Marshall Williams. The first images were shown during a promo for Disney Channel's Summer 2014, while the first promo aired on June 27, 2014 during the premiere of the Disney Channel Original Movie, Zapped. The film premiered on August 15, 2014.

== Plot ==
Mae Hartley and Gabby Harrison are intelligent tenth graders. Mae has a crush on jock Jaden, whom she tutors and thinks is going to invite her to the Homecoming dance. She is publicly humiliated by Nevaeh, a mean cheerleader who is dating Jaden. Mae claims she already has a boyfriend. To cover the lie, Gabby offers to program a virtual boyfriend for Mae using a computer software known as X-17, which they believe Mae's father, Dr. James Hartley, uses to design high definition video game characters for his company. Gabby creates a virtual boyfriend according to Mae's instructions. Mae names him Albert.

The software goes haywire and short circuits James' computer. Mae's brother Bart agrees to fix the computer if Gabby will go to homecoming with him. The next morning, Albert arrives at school and becomes popular among the students. Albert is able to speed, read, and throw/kick harder than normal humans. Bart and Gabby learn that she created a robot soldier and hacked into the Pentagon to do so. They also learn that James works for the Pentagon. General McFee discovers the X-17 prototype robot soldier is missing.

Later that day, Albert asks Mae to Homecoming. Feeling overwhelmed, she tries to explain to Albert that she does not feel like she deserves to be his girlfriend. Gabby and Mae talk privately. Gabby thinks the whole thing is getting out of hand and Albert is coming between them. Mae agrees to go with Albert to the dance.

At the Hartley house, Bart and Gabby witness Zephyr, Weevil and Pox, members of the international arms dealer group Black Sigma, break into the house in search of the prototype soldier. During a school football game, Gabby tries to warn Mae about Albert being a robot soldier, but the two get into an argument. Albert is chosen to play in the game and helps the team stage a comeback. U.S. Army Soldiers led by McFee arrive at the game following an EMP-caused power outage caused by Black Sigma that short circuits Albert's wiring.

The Black Sigma members are captured by the U.S. Army, and Albert begins a global mission to fight danger. Mae and Gabby are told by McFee that they must forget about Albert's existence. Mae is upset, but she believes that Albert will still arrive for the homecoming dance, and James is surprised when he does. McFee tells James that the U.S. Army has known all along that Albert would return for the homecoming dance. McFee plans to retrieve Albert, but James convinces him to wait until Albert completes his mission, which is to kiss Mae at the dance. McFee and the U.S. Army lead a mission to make the night perfect for Albert and Mae, which includes stuffing the ballot box to make them the homecoming king and queen.

Nevaeh tries to ruin Mae's night but is dumped by Jaden in the process. When Mae is crowned homecoming queen, she feels conflicted, while Nevaeh is disappointed. Jaden tells Gabby and Bart that he originally intended to ask Mae to homecoming, but was not brave enough to do so. Gabby and Mae reconcile.

Mae and Albert dance, but as he attempts to kiss her, she backs away and reveals that even though the moment is perfect, it does not feel right. Mae realizes she wants a relationship with a real boy who is not perfectly manipulated. Albert is impressed by her emotional depth. He points out that the U.S. Army is here to retrieve him, and Mae fulfills his request to initiate his self-destruct after he tells her that it is what he wants. Albert bids her goodbye and begins to pulsate with lights. Gabby, Mae, and the guests watch as Albert breaks out of the venue through the ceiling and is destroyed.

Bart covers and thanks Principal Fragner for the 'awesome special effects'. The party continues, and Jaden asks Mae out. She tells him she will reply later. Mae and Gabby are excited that Jaden told Mae how he feels, but Mae says no boy will get in the way of their friendship. However, Gabby reveals that she has changed her mind about boys and is now dating Bart.

== Cast ==
- Kelli Berglund as Mae Hartley
- China Anne McClain as Gabby Harrison
- Marshall Williams as Albert Banks / X-17
- Matt Shively as Bart Hartley
- Ashley Argota as Nevaeh Barnes
- Noah Centineo as Jaden Stark
- Ron Lea as General McFee
- Roger Bart as Dr. James Hartley
- Sasha Clements as Marnie
- Ieva Lucs as Major Jenks
- Paulino Nunes as Zephyr
- Matthew G. Taylor as Weevil
- Alex Karzis as Pox
- Richard McMillan as Principal Fragner
- Martin Roach as Coach Voss
- Helen Johns as Computer Voice

== Songs ==
- Sabrina Carpenter – "Stand Out"
- Marshall Williams and Kelli Berglund – "Love You like a Love Song" (Selena Gomez and the Scene cover)
- Mo' Cheddah feat. Cristina Renae – "Higher"
- China Anne McClain and Kelli Berglund – "Something Real"

== Production ==
Production began in Toronto, Ontario, Canada, and was filmed at North Toronto Collegiate Institute primarily. The film was shot from July 23 to August 30, 2013. It is directed by Paul Hoen, executive produced by Robin Schorr and Adam Kossack, co-executive produced by Dan Seligmann and written by Jason Mayland.

== Release ==
=== Broadcast ===
The film was originally released on Watch Disney Channel on August 11, 2014. It premiered on August 15, 2014 on Disney Channel in the United States and Family Channel in Canada. Ariana Grande's music video for "Break Free" also aired on Disney Channel during the movie as well as new episodes of Dog With a Blog and Girl Meets World following and preceding the movie. Disney Channel (Netherlands & Flanders) has an airdate of September 6, 2014. Disney Channel (UK & Ireland) has a release date of September 19, 2014. The film aired in Turkey on Moviemax Family on November 22, 2015.

== Reception ==
The August 15, 2014 premiere airing of How to Build a Better Boy on Disney Channel drew 4.6 million viewers.

== Music ==
American singers China Anne McClain and Kelli Berglund recorded the song "Something Real" from the movie. It was released as a digital download in 2014 by Walt Disney Records.

== Awards and nominations ==
Year	Award	Category	Nominee	Result	Ref.
2013	Directors Guild of America Awards	Outstanding Directing – Children's Programs	Paul Hoen	Nominated	
2013	NAACP Image Awards	Outstanding Performance by a Youth	China Anne McClain	Nominated	
