= Kelli Berglund =

American actress (born 1996)

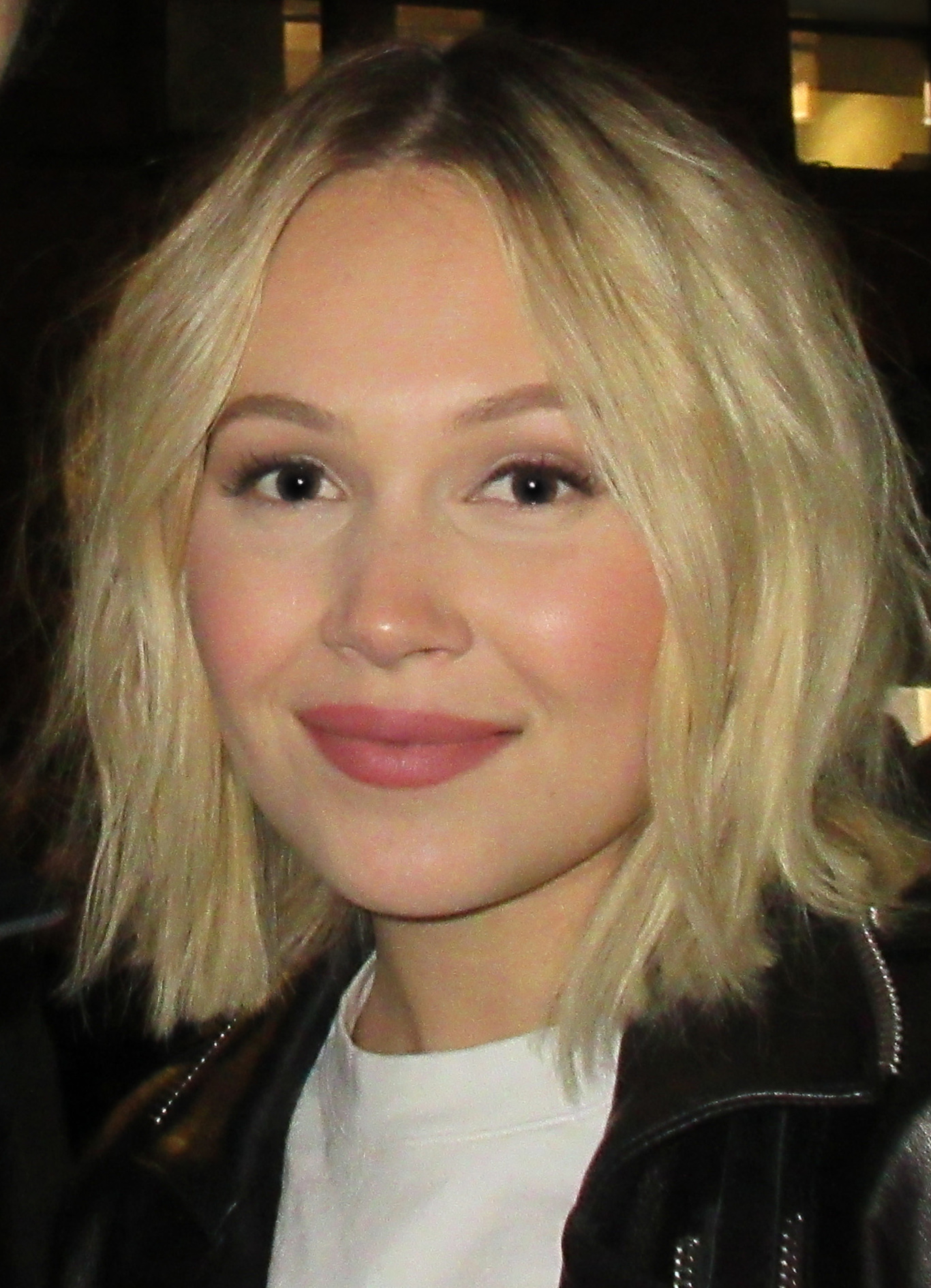
- Berglund in 2019
- Born: Kelli Michelle Berglund; February 9, 1996 (age 30); Moorpark, California, U.S.
- Education: Moorpark High School
- Occupation: Actress
- Years active: 2006–present

Kelli Michelle Berglund (born February 9, 1996) is an American actress. She became known for starring as Bree Davenport in the Disney XD series Lab Rats (2012–2016) and its sequel Lab Rats: Elite Force (2016). She also starred in the comedy series Now Apocalypse (2019) and the drama series Heels (2021–2023), both for Starz.

== Early life ==
Berglund was born and raised in Moorpark, California, where she continues to live with her parents, Mark and Michelle (née Blandy) Berglund, and younger sister, Kirra (b. 2002). She is a graduate of Moorpark High School's independent study program. In her spare time, she enjoys swimming and photography. She is of Italian, Irish, German, Swedish, English, and Scottish descent.

== Career ==
=== 2006–2012: Early career ===
Berglund began her career at a young age as a series regular on TLC's Hip Hop Harry. TV appearances also include Are You Smarter Than a 5th Grader, and America's Next Producer. Berglund also appeared in the indie film, Bye Bye Benjamin. Her commercial credits include campaigns for Old Navy, Hyundai, Bratz, McDonald's and Mattel, among others. She has also appeared in print and modeling campaigns for Reebok and the Camarillo Academy of Performing Arts. Berglund has been honored with many awards in dance for her lyrical contemporary and jazz. Though she is equally versatile in these types of dance, her favorite style is contemporary — a blend of ballet and jazz.

=== 2012–2016: Lab Rats and other Disney roles ===
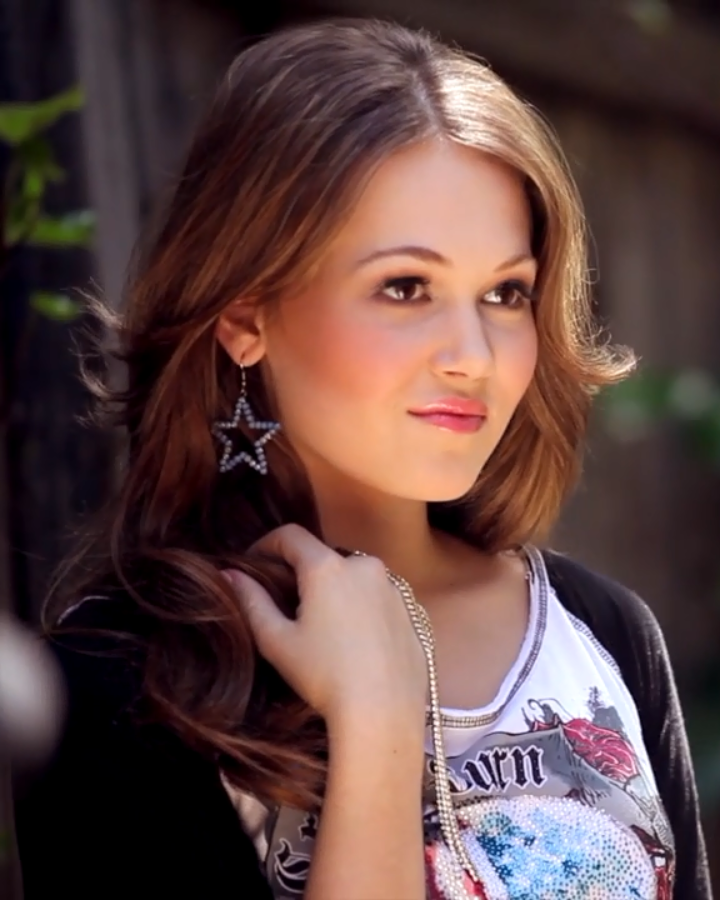
Berglund in 2012

From 2012 to 2016, Berglund starred as Bree Davenport, an overly outgoing, bionic super-human with super speed, in the Disney XD live-action comedy series Lab Rats alongside co-stars Tyrel Jackson Williams, Billy Unger, and Spencer Boldman. She continued to play Bree Davenport on Lab Rats' 2016 spinoff series Lab Rats: Elite Force.

In 2013, Berglund guest starred on the Disney XD series Kickin' It, where she played karate prodigy Sloane Jennings. In this episode, her character sings "Had Me @ Hello" as a duet with Kim Crawford, played by Olivia Holt. In mid-2013, Berglund began work on the 2013 Disney Channel Original Movie, How to Build a Better Boy, in which she stars as Mae Hartley, a tech-savvy young woman who along with her best friend, devises a plan to create the perfect boyfriend. She sings "Something Real" with China Anne McClain which was released on July 29, 2014.

=== 2016–present: Career expansion ===
In 2016, Berglund co-starred in the NBC television film, Dolly Parton's Christmas of Many Colors: Circle of Love, playing the role of Willadeene Parton, Dolly Parton's older sister. The same year, she starred in the film Raising the Bar, in which she plays a former gymnast who gets back into the sport after relocating to Australia. In 2018, Berglund starred in Going for Gold, a film about cheerleading, set in Adelaide, Australia.

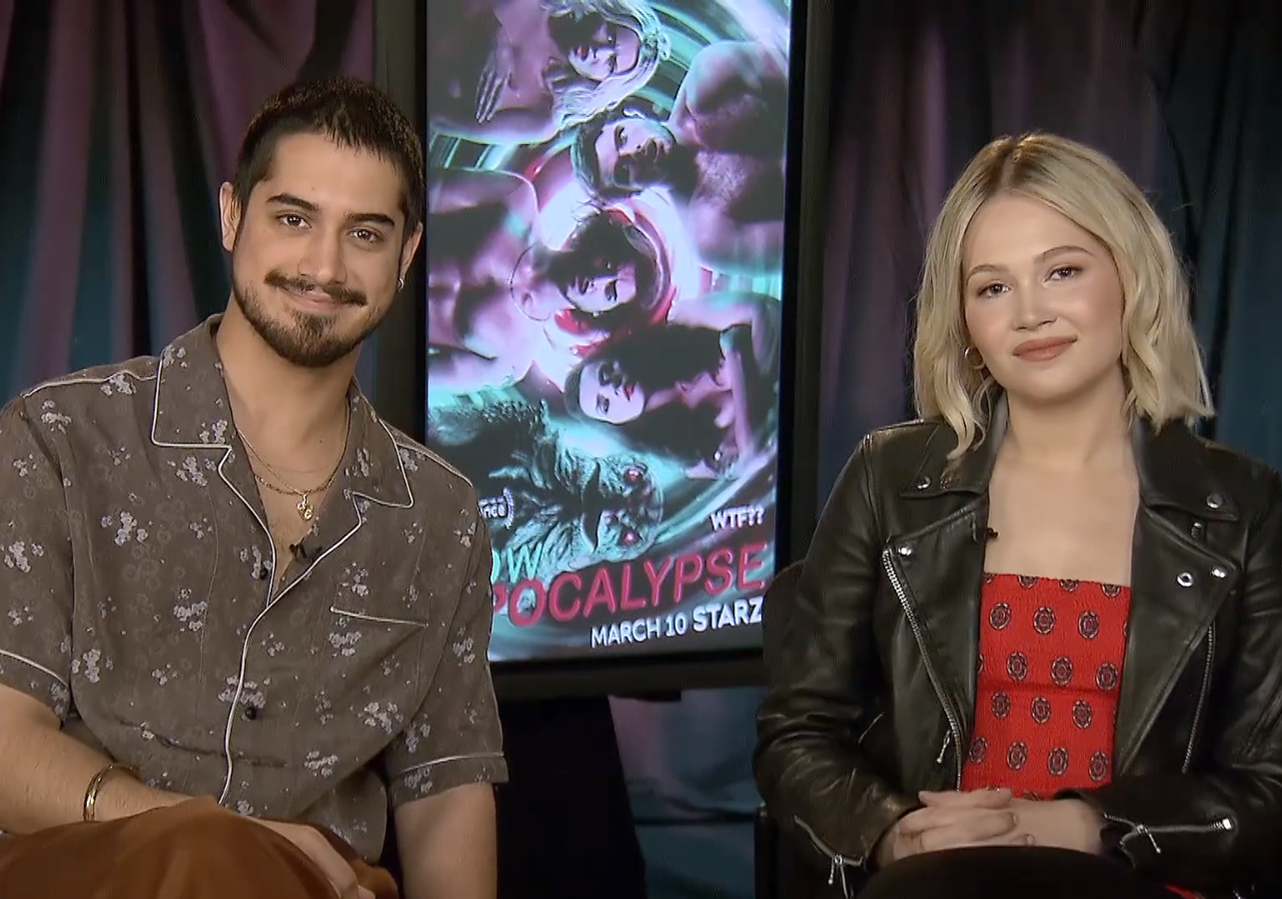
Berglund and her Now Apocalypse co-star Avan Jogia in 2019

In June 2018, Berglund was cast in the starring role of Carly in the 2019 Starz television series Now Apocalypse. In 2019, Berglund was cast in the recurring role of Olivia in the fourth season of the drama television series Animal Kingdom.

Berglund also had a minor role as a teen in a Billie Eilish costume in the 2020 Netflix comedy film Hubie Halloween. In 2021, Berglund had a supporting role in the crime drama film Cherry starring Tom Holland and Ciara Bravo, directed by Anthony and Joe Russo, based on the 2018 novel of the same name by Nico Walker. From 2021 to 2023, she was cast to play the main role in Starz's drama series Heels, in which she played the main role of Crystal Tyler.

In 2024, Berglund starred alongside Amadeus Serafini in the romantic comedy film Wallbanger. That same year, she appeared in the film Queen of the Ring as wrestler Nell Stewart. In 2025, she appeared as a guest star on the ABC series Doctor Odyssey. In May 2026, it was announced that Berglund was cast in the Hulu series Prison Break as a series regular.

== Personal life ==
Berglund began dating Bad Feelings musician Tyler Wilson in March 2016. They became engaged on November 9, 2024 after 8 years of dating.

== Filmography ==
=== Film ===
Year	Title	Role	Notes
2006	Bye Bye Benjamin	Birthday Party Guest	Short film
2015	One Night	Rachel	
2016	Raising the Bar	Kelly Johnson	
2018	Going for Gold	Emma Wilson	
2020	Hubie Halloween	Billie Eilish Girl	
2021	Cherry	Madison Kowalski	
2021	Mark, Mary & Some Other People	Bunny	
2024	Wallbanger	Caroline	
2024	Queen of the Ring	Nell Stewart	

=== Television ===
Year	Title	Role	Notes
2006–2008	Hip Hop Harry	Kelli	Recurring role
2012–2016	Lab Rats	Bree Davenport	Main role
2013	Kickin' It	Sloane Jennings	Episode: "The New Girl"
2014	How to Build a Better Boy	Mae Hartley	Television film
2016	Lab Rats: Elite Force	Bree Davenport	Main role
2016	Dolly Parton's Christmas of Many Colors: Circle of Love	Willadeene Parton	Television film
2017	The Night Shift	Sofia	2 episodes
2019	Hell's Kitchen	Herself	Episode: "An Episode of Firsts"
2019	Now Apocalypse	Carly Carlson	Main role
2019	Fosse/Verdon	Young Gwen Verdon	Episode: "Me and My Baby"
2019	Animal Kingdom	Olivia	Recurring role (season 4)
2019–2021	The Goldbergs	Ren	Recurring role (seasons 7, 9)
2021–2023	Heels	Crystal Tyler	Main role
2025	Doctor Odyssey	Penny Hollister	Episode: "Double-Booked"
TBD	Prison Break †	Cheyenne	Main role

Key
†	Denotes television productions that have not yet been released
