= Caitlin Sanchez =

American actress (born 1996)

- Born: January 17, 1996 (age 30); Englewood, New Jersey, U.S.
- Occupation: Actress
- Years active: 2004–present

Caitlin Sanchez (born January 17, 1996) is an American actress, best known for being the second voice of the title character Dora in the Nickelodeon animated children's series Dora the Explorer.

== Career ==
Sanchez was born on January 17, 1996, in Englewood, New Jersey, and raised in Fairview, in Bergen County, New Jersey, by her Cuban American parents. As of 2008, Sanchez was being home schooled.

Interviewed on National Public Radio's All Things Considered, Sanchez told host Robert Siegel that the show first aired when she was four-years old and that she had grown up watching the program. She recounted having a Dora-themed bedroom, curtains and backpack when she was younger.

She is a jazz fan who has played the piano since she was five and enjoys listening to the music of John Coltrane and Thelonious Monk and vocalists Ella Fitzgerald and Billie Holiday. When NPR's Siegel indicated that it was unusual for someone her age to be a fan of Thelonious Monk, Sanchez responded that "He has this really unique style. He kind of hits the piano really hard. And I love his offbeats. Sometimes he goes on-beat; sometimes he goes off. He's full of surprises." She also enjoys playing soccer and tennis.

On September 15, 2008, Sanchez took over the voice role of the seven-year-old lead character in Dora the Explorer, following the departure of the character's original voice actor Kathleen Herles that year when she went to college. She was selected from among 600 girls who auditioned for the part. She voiced the character in only 35 episodes until 2012, when Fátima Ptacek took over the role.

Besides appearing in several national commercials, Sanchez's other TV work includes as Lupe Rojas in an episode of Law & Order: SVU, ("Uncle" 2006) and appearing as Celia, the daughter of Carlos Ponce's character, on Lipstick Jungle. Her film work includes appearing in the film Phoebe in Wonderland.

Sanchez performed the National Anthem at an NBA game at the IZOD Center on November 21, 2009.

== Filmography ==
- 2006: Law & Order: Special Victims Unit – Lupe Rojas (1 episode)
- 2008: Dora the Explorer – Dora (TV series; 2008–2012)
- 2008: Phoebe in Wonderland – Monica
- 2008: Lipstick Jungle – Celia Vega
- 2008: Dora Saves the Snow Princess – Dora
- 2009: Dora Saves the Crystal Kingdom – Dora
- 2009: Dora's Christmas Carol Adventure – Dora
- 2011: Dora's Ballet Adventure – Dora
- 2011: Dora's Enchanted Forest Adventure – Dora
- 2012: The Secret of Atlantis – Dora

== Discography ==
- Dora's Party Favorites
- Dora's Christmas
- We Did It! Dora's Greatest Hits

== Awards and nominations ==
- 2009 40th NAACP Image Awards: Outstanding Performance in a Youth/Children's Program for Dora the Explorer
- 2009 Imagen Awards: Best Actress/Television for Dora the Explorer
- 2010 41st NAACP Image Awards: Outstanding Performance in a Youth/Children's Program for Dora the Explorer
- 2010 Imagen Awards: Best Actress/Television for Dora the Explorer
