= China Anne McClain =

American actress and singer (born 1998)

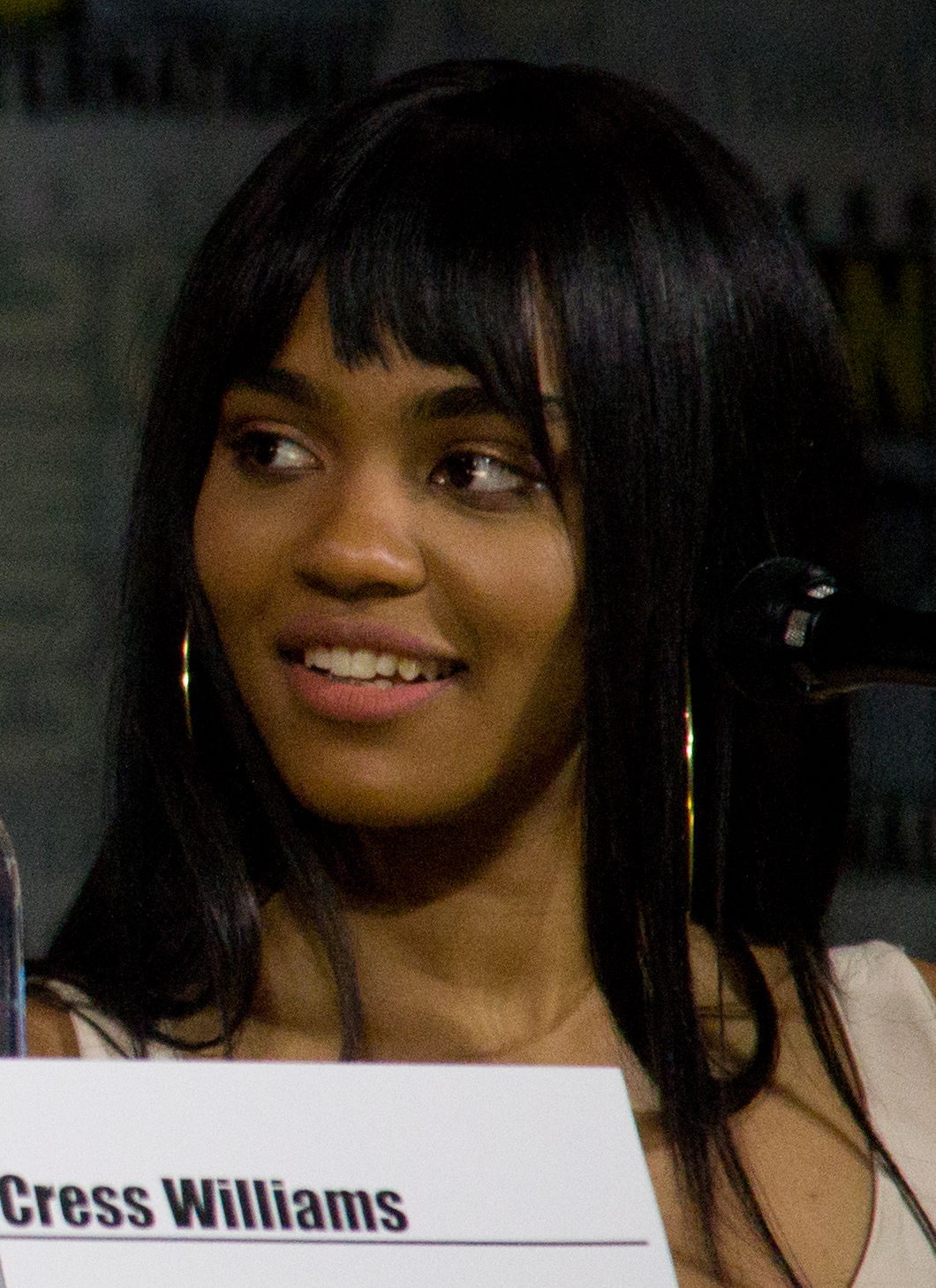
- McClain at the 2017 San Diego Comic-Con
- Born: August 25, 1998 (age 28); Decatur, Georgia, U.S.
- Other name: China McClain
- Occupations: Actress; singer
- Works: Discography
- Relatives: Sierra McClain (sister); Lauryn McClain (sister)
- Musical career
- Genres: R&B; pop
- Instruments: Vocals; violin
- Years active: 2005–present
- Label: Hollywood
- Member of: Thriii

China Anne McClain (born August 25, 1998) is an American actress and singer. McClain's career began when she was seven years old, portraying Alexis in the film The Gospel (2005), and then China James in Daddy's Little Girls (2007). She then received recognition for starring as Jazmine Payne in the television sitcom Tyler Perry's House of Payne (2007–2012; 2020–present) and as Charlotte McKenzie in the comedy film Grown Ups (2010) and its sequel Grown Ups 2 (2013). She became globally known for starring as Chyna Parks in the Disney Channel television series A.N.T. Farm (2011–2014), and achieved further breakthrough success as Uma in the channel's musical film franchise Descendants (2017-2024); she had previously voiced Freddie in Wicked World as well. In 2018, McClain began starring in The CW superhero series Black Lightning (2018–2021) as Jennifer Pierce / Lightning before leaving the show in 2020. She also reprised her character Jazmine Payne on OWN's revival of The Paynes (2018). She made her Broadway debut in August 2026 as Daisy Buchanan in The Great Gatsby opposite Ryan McCartan.

McClain began her musical career in 2005 as a member of the sibling girl group the 3mcclaingirls with her sisters Sierra and Lauryn. Her first professional single was "Your Biggest Fan" with Nick Jonas on the soundtrack album Jonas L.A. (2010). In 2011, McClain signed with Hollywood Records both as a solo artist and with her sister girl group, known as the McClain Sisters. Her debut single as a solo artist was "Dynamite" which peaked at no. 2 on the US Kid Digital Songs, and her second single, "Calling All the Monsters", peaked at no. 1 on the same chart and earned 25,000 downloads within its first week of release and was certified gold. The A.N.T. Farm soundtrack album spent five weeks on the Billboard Kids chart in 2011 and sold 14,000 copies in its first week of release. Billboard also named her the sixth best-selling artist for digital kids' songs in 2012. In 2017, her single "What's My Name" from Descendants 2 peaked on several Billboard charts, and was certified gold, with 500,000 units sold, on November 10, 2017. In June 2020, the sibling girl group changed their name to Thriii.

== Early life ==
China Anne McClain was born on August 25, 1998 and raised in Decatur, Georgia. Her father, Michael McClain, is a music producer who produced a track on Solange Knowles' debut album Solo Star (2002). Her mother, Shontell (née Rucker), is a songwriter and former screenwriter. She has two older sisters, Sierra and Lauryn, who are also actresses and singers, and has a younger brother, Gabriel.

== Career ==
=== 2005–2010: Daddy's Little Girls and Tyler Perry's House of Payne ===
McClain was discovered in 2005 by a music executive who heard her singing and encouraged director Rob Hardy to audition her for his 2005 feature film The Gospel. McClain auditioned for the Disney Channel Original Movie Jump In! (2007) and she won a role, but turned it down because she was too young. Instead, she starred in the television sitcom Tyler Perry's House of Payne (2007–present) as Jazmine Payne, after catching Tyler Perry's attention. Disney kept working with McClain where she booked many guest roles in the years to come. She appeared in the film Daddy's Little Girls (2007) with her sisters, Sierra and Lauryn, who are also actresses and played her older sisters in the film.

McClain appeared in several other shows and films such as Hannah Montana (2009) with future co-star Sierra McCormick, NCIS (2009), and the sports drama film Hurricane Season (2009). In 2009, McClain booked the starring role as Janet in the Disney Channel pilot Jack and Janet Save the Planet alongside future co-stars McCormick and Jake Short. The pilot was not picked up and never aired. She also appeared in the 2010 comedy film Grown Ups as Charlotte McKenzie, the daughter of Chris Rock's and Maya Rudolph's characters. McClain had a recurring role in the second season of the Disney Channel show Jonas (2010) as Kiara (bodyguard's niece), and performs alongside Nick Jonas for the song "Your Biggest Fan" which was featured both in the series and on Jonas L.A., the show's soundtrack album.

=== 2011–2014: A.N.T. Farm and the McClain Sisters ===
In February 2011, McClain guest-starred on Wizards of Waverly Place (2011). In May, McClain won the NAMIC Vision Award for Best Performance – Actress of Comedy, for her performance as Jazmine Payne. Later that year, McClain was cast as the lead role, Chyna Parks, in the Disney Channel series A.N.T. Farm, which Disney suited for her. She sang and composed the series' theme music titled "Exceptional". For the show, McClain recorded a cover of Taio Cruz's "Dynamite", for which the music video amassed more than 1 million views in under a week after release on YouTube. She appeared in an episode of PrankStars (2011). For the Disney Channel Halloween special in 2011, she performed the song "Calling All the Monsters". On June 14, 2011, McClain and her sisters – known as the McClain Sisters – signed with Hollywood Records.

The A.N.T. Farm soundtrack was released on October 11, 2011, which includes McClain's version of "Dynamite" and her original song "Calling All the Monsters", among other songs performed by her featured in the show with new songs performed by some of her fellow cast members and two songs performed by the McClain Sisters. The soundtrack for the show was successful, spending five weeks on the Billboard Kids chart in 2011, peaked at number 29 on the US Billboard 200, peaked at number 2 on the US Top Soundtracks, and sold 14,000 copies within the first week of release. On September 28, 2011, McClain released "Calling All the Monsters" to iTunes. "Calling All the Monsters" charted at number 86 on the Billboard Hot 100 chart, and received 25,000 downloads within its first week of release. That same month McClain earned a J-14 Teen Icon Award nomination for Icon of Tomorrow.

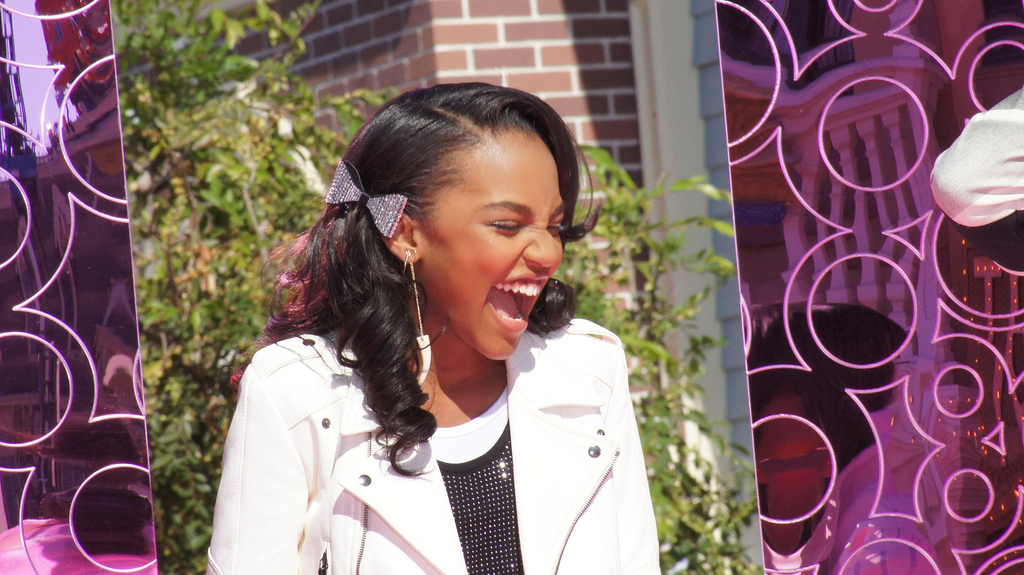
McClain performing at the 2011 Disney Parks Christmas Day Parade.

On November 10, 2011, McClain met with the then First Lady Michelle Obama at the White House to speak about the Joining Forces initiative; the next day, Disney Channel aired messages promoting the initiative, which its event recognizes America's military families and children, and brings awareness on Veterans Day. On November 19, 2011, McClain performed at the Magnificent Mile Lights Festival in Chicago, IL. On November 24, 2011, she performed her song "Unstoppable" at the 85th Macy's Thanksgiving Day Parade. In December, McClain and her sisters, Sierra and Lauryn, performed their new version of the song "Jingle Bell Rock" at the 2011 Disney Parks Christmas Day Parade.

In February 2012, McClain performed her song "Unstoppable" and guest-starred in the sketch comedy/variety TV series So Random!. Later that month, she received an NAACP Image Award nomination for Outstanding Performance by a Youth for her performance as Chyna Parks in A.N.T. Farm. On March 4, 2012, McClain was the opening act alongside her sisters in Houston, TX for the pop male quartet Big Time Rush on their Better with U Tour. On March 11, 2012, the McClain Sisters performed their new song called "Rise", featured in the Disneynature film Chimpanzee, at the Mall of America. The song was released on March 23, 2012. The music video premiered on March 25, 2012 during an episode of Austin & Ally. It was also a featured song for Disney's Friends for Change.

McClain also sang theme music for the first three seasons for the Disney Channel animated children's TV series Doc McStuffins, which premiered on March 23, 2012, and guest-starred later that year as Tisha McStuffins, the title character's cousin. On April 9, 2012, McClain performed at the 2012 White House Easter Egg Roll with her sisters. In September, McClain earned a nomination for another J-14 Teen Icon Award as an Iconic Triple Threat. In December, it was announced that she was nominated for another NAACP Image Award for Outstanding Performance by a Youth for A.N.T. Farm. Billboard also named her the sixth best-selling artist for digital kids' songs in 2012.

McClain was one of the award presenters at the 2013 Radio Disney Music Awards in April. In July, she reprised her role as Charlotte McKenzie in the 2013 sequel Grown Ups 2. On December 27, 2013, it was announced on her Twitter page that A.N.T. Farm would be ending after its third season. The series finale aired on March 21, 2014. On the same day, it was revealed that the McClain Sisters had left Hollywood Records. The McClain Sisters changed their name to simply McClain, their last names.

In the March/April 2014 issue of BYOU magazine, McClain stated it was "bittersweet" that A.N.T Farm was ending, and announced plans to focus on doing music with her sisters. For her performance in the series, in 2014, McClain won both the NAMIC Vision Award for Best Performance – Actress of Comedy, and the NAACP Image Award for Outstanding Performance by a Youth.

In April 2014, it was announced that McClain would compete as one of the celebrity contestants on ABC's Sing Your Face Off (2014). She competed from May to June of that year, performing as several iconic singers: Rihanna, Tina Turner, Michael Jackson, Alicia Keys, James Brown, and Whitney Houston; she won the show's first and only season. In August, McClain starred in the Disney Channel television film How to Build a Better Boy (2014) alongside Kelli Berglund, and released the single "Something Real" which was featured in the film. For her performance, McClain received an NAACP Image Award nomination for Outstanding Performance by a Youth. In August 2014, McClain hosted the 19th Arthur Ashe Kids' Day, and also performed with her sisters. In November 2014, McClain guest-starred on R.L. Stine's The Haunted Hour in the episode "Argh V".

=== 2015–2021: Descendants and Black Lightning ===
In 2015, McClain was featured in the FOX series Bones (2015) in the episode "The Lost in the Found", playing Kathryn Walling. McClain sang "Night is Young" on the soundtrack for the Disney Channel Original Movie Descendants. Her song also appeared in Descendants: Wicked World (2015). She voiced Freddie, the daughter of Dr. Facilier. Her sister, Lauryn McClain, voiced the character in season 2. McClain voiced the role of Ghufaira in the animated Biblical action-drama film Bilal: A New Breed of Hero (2015). She went on to guest-star on The Night Shift, and starred in a voice role as Lyra in the English-language version of the Slavic film Sheep and Wolves, both in 2016. On November 25, 2016, McClain performed her cover of the song "This Christmas" at the Disney Parks Presents: A Descendants Magical Holiday Celebration.

In April 2017, she was an award presenter at the 2017 Radio Disney Music Awards. In June, Variety named her one of the "10 TV Stars to Watch in 2017" for her role as Jennifer Pierce in her then-upcoming 2018 television series Black Lightning. In July, Descendants 2 premiered, in which she played the villain Uma, the daughter of Ursula. Her single "What's My Name" from the film peaked on several Billboard charts and was certified gold, with 500,000 units sold, on November 10, 2017. She also guest-starred as Sheena on K.C. Undercover (2017), and starred as Meg in the Lifetime television film Ten: Murder Island (2017), which she also executive produced.

In January 2018, McClain began playing as Jennifer Pierce in Black Lightning on The CW, and in February reprised her role as Jazmine Payne on The Paynes (2018). Later that year in September, she reprised her role as Uma in the television short film Under the Sea: A Descendants Short Story. In November, she starred in the action thriller film Blood Brother, opposite Trey Songz and Ron Killings. In November 2018, McClain performed her original song "Young Guns" during a second-season episode of Black Lightning.

In August 2019, McClain reprised her role as Uma in Descendants 3. In February 2020, it was announced that Tyler Perry's House of Payne would be revived on BET in the next season. In June 2020, the girl group changed their name to Thriii, and performed at Radio Disney Presents ARDYs Summer Playlist. On August 20, it was announced that Tyler Perry's House of Payne would premiere on September 2, 2020. Later that year, McClain was part of the cast of the Netflix dark comedy Hubie Halloween.

In March 2021, McClain left Black Lightning and her role was recast with Laura Kariuki. McClain, however, later returned to reprise her role in the series finale.

== Personal life ==
In 2014, Lauryn and China created a YouTube channel where they posted singing videos, challenges, tags, and Q&As. Sierra appeared in several of the channel's videos. As of August 2020, the channel has approximately 701,000 subscribers and 29 million views. They have since renamed their channel Thriii.

In 2020, McClain started her online persona by releasing makeup transformations, cosplaying, lip-syncing audios and short Christian sermons on TikTok. The account has more than 17 million followers.

As of 2011, she resided in Los Angeles, CA. McClain cites her parents as her biggest influences.

== Filmography ==
=== Film ===
Year	Title	Role	Notes
2005	The Gospel	Alexis	
2006	Madea's Family Reunion	Youth	Uncredited role
2007	A Dennis the Menace Christmas	Margaret Wade	Direct-to-video film
2007	Daddy's Little Girls	China James	Credited as China McClain
2008	Six Blocks Wide	Neighbor #8	Short film
2009	Hurricane Season	Alana Collins	
2010	Grown Ups	Charlotte McKenzie	
2013	Grown Ups 2	Charlotte McKenzie	
2014	How To Build a Better Boy	Gabby Harrison	
2015	Bilal: A New Breed of Hero	Ghufaira (voice)	
2016	Sheep and Wolves	Lyra (voice)	
2018	Blood Brother	Darcy	
2018	Under the Sea: A Descendants Short Story	Uma	Short film
2020	Hubie Halloween	Miss Chantal Taylor	
2024	Descendants: The Rise of Red	Uma	
2024	Brewster's Millions: Christmas	Morgan Brewster	

=== Television ===
Year	Title	Role	Notes
2006–2012, 2020–present	Tyler Perry's House of Payne	Jazmine Payne	Main role (season 1–4, 6–9); recurring (season 12–present)
2008	Jimmy Kimmel Live!	Natasha Obama	1 episode
2009	Hannah Montana	Isabel	Episode: "Welcome to the Bungle"
2009	NCIS	Kayla Vance	Episode: "Knockout"
2009	Jack and Janet Save the Planet	Janet	Episode: "Pilot"
2010	Jonas	Kiara Tyshana	Recurring role (season 2)
2011	Wizards of Waverly Place	Tina	2 episodes
2011–2014	A.N.T. Farm	Chyna Parks	Lead role
2011	PrankStars	Herself	Episode: "Game Showed Up"
2012	So Random!	Herself	Episode: "China Anne McClain"
2012	Doc McStuffins	Tisha McStuffins (voice)	Episode: "Through the Reading Glasses"
2014	Sing Your Face Off	Herself	Contestant
2014	R. L. Stine's The Haunting Hour: The Series	Sam Covington	Episode: "Argh V"
2015	Bones	Kathryn Walling	Episode: "The Lost in the Found"
2015	VeggieTales in the House	Jenna Chive (voice)	2 episodes
2015–2016	Descendants: Wicked World	Freddie Facilier (voice)	Main role (season 1)
2016	The Night Shift	Lauren	Episode: "Unexpected"
2017	K.C. Undercover	Sheena	2 episodes
2017	Descendants 2	Uma	Television film
2017	Project Runway	Herself	Guest judge
2017	Ten: Murder Island	Meg	Television film
2018	The Paynes	Jazmine Payne	3 episodes
2018–2021	Black Lightning	Jennifer Pierce / Lightning	Main role
2019	Descendants 3	Uma	Television film
2021	Descendants: The Royal Wedding	Uma (voice)	Television film
2023	9-1-1: Lone Star	Lisa Williams	Episode: "Open"

== See also ==
- Thriii
- List of YouTubers

== Awards and nominations ==
Year	Award	Category	Work	Result	Ref.
2011	NAMIC Vision Awards	Best Performance – Actress of Comedy	Tyler Perry's House of Payne	Won	
2011	J-14 Teen Icon Awards	Icon of Tomorrow	Herself	Nominated	
2012	J-14 Teen Icon Awards	Iconic Triple Threat	Herself	Nominated	
2012	NAACP Image Awards	Outstanding Performance by a Youth	A.N.T. Farm	Nominated	
2013	NAACP Image Awards	Outstanding Performance by a Youth	A.N.T. Farm	Nominated	
2014	NAMIC Vision Awards	Best Performance – Actress of Comedy	A.N.T. Farm	Won	
2014	NAACP Image Awards	Outstanding Performance by a Youth	A.N.T. Farm	Won	
2015	NAACP Image Awards	Outstanding Performance by a Youth	How to Build a Better Boy	Nominated	
