= America's Next Producer =

Television series

- Genre: Reality Television; Game Show
- Presented by: Ananda Lewis
- Judges: David Hill; Matt Roush
- Country of origin: United States
- Original language: English
- No. of seasons: 1
- No. of episodes: 10

Production
- Production location: Los Angeles
- Running time: approx. 60 min.

Original release
- Network: TV Guide Channel
- Release: July 18 – September 12, 2007

America's Next Producer is a 2007 reality television series in which ten contestants competed for the title of America's Next Producer, as part of which they received TV Guide Network deal, office space in Hollywood, 17" MacBook Pro, 23" monitor, Final Cut Studio video editing software, and $100,000. Each week they were challenged to produce a certain genre within a certain amount of time with what they are given, with one contestant eliminated each week until a winner was chosen.

Gwen Uszuko send in a video to the official website, and this was chosen as one of the three videos that anyone could vote online, the winner getting a spot on the show. She emailed about the contest to two of Notre Dame's teachers and her message was posted where students could see it. This resulted in her getting twice the voices as the person who came in second.

== Candidates ==
The candidates were:

Name	Age *	Occupation
Gwen Uszuko	22	Web Producer
Jessica Laccarino	32	Producer, Speed Channel
Alphonzo "Zo" Wesson	46	TV Director/Producer
Daniel Hosea	33	TV News Writer/Producer
Evie Shapiro	37	Freelance Producer
Steve "Schliz" Schleinitz	32	Reality TV Producer
Adam Mutterperl	32	Comedy Writer/Producer
Sharon Nash	46	Freelance Producer
Lindsay Liles	24	Producer, Style Network
Bradley Gallo	29	Freelance Producer

* as of the date of the programme.

Elimination Table
Episode	1	2	3	4	5	6	7	8	9	10
Gwen	LOW	SAFE	HIGH	LOW	SAFE	SAFE	SAFE	WIN	SAFE	WINNER
Jessica	SAFE	SAFE	SAFE	WIN	HIGH	SAFE	LOW	SAFE	SAFE	RUNNER-UP
Zo	HIGH	SAFE	SAFE	HIGH	WIN	SAFE	SAFE	SAFE	OUT	
Daniel	WIN	LOW	SAFE	LOW	SAFE	SAFE	OUT			
Evie	SAFE	SAFE	SAFE	SAFE	LOW	OUT				
Schliz	SAFE	SAFE	WIN	SAFE	OUT					
Adam	SAFE	SAFE	LOW	OUT						
Sharon	LOW	WIN	OUT							
Lindsay	LOW	OUT								
Bradley	OUT									

(WINNER) Producer was chosen by viewers as the winner of The Fashion Show.
[(1ST) RUNNER-UP] Producer came in second place in the votes.
(WIN) Producer was selected by judges as the winner of the challenge.
(HIGH) Producer had one of the best project determined by the judges.
(LOW) Producer was called last before the final two.
(LOW) Producer was in the bottom two.
(OUT) Producer was eliminated.
[SAFE] Producer was good enough to move on to the next round.

== Episodes ==
=== Episode 1 (July 18, 2007) ===
- Genre: comedy
- Challenge: produce a 1-minute comedic field piece.
- Judges: David Hill, Matt Roush, and David Freeman (guest judge)
- WINNER: Daniel Hosea
- ELIMINATED: Bradley Gallo

=== Episode 2 (July 25, 2007) ===
- Genre: reality
- Challenge: produce a 2-minute pitch reel for the next hit reality TV show.
- Judges: David Hill, Matt Roush, and Chris Moore (guest judge)
- WINNER: Sharon Nash
- ELIMINATED: Lindsay Liles

=== Episode 3 (August 1, 2007) ===
- Genre: comedy
- Challenge: to produce a 3-minute sitcom piece.
- Judges: David Hill, [Matt Roush, and Robin Shorts (guest judge)
- WINNER: Steve Schleinitz a.k.a. Schliz
- ELIMINATED: Sharon Nash

=== Episode 4 (August 8, 2007) ===
- Genre: children's show
- Challenge: create 2 segments for a new children's show
- Judges: David Hill, Matt Roush, Claude Brooks (guest judge), and Gelila Asres (guest judge)
- WINNER: Jessica Iaccarino
- ELIMINATED: Adam Mutterperl

=== Episode 5 (August 15, 2007) ===
- Genre: public service announcement
- Challenge: produce a 30-second public service announcement
- Judges: David Hill, Matt Roush, and Daniel Hinerfeld (guest judge)
- WINNER: Alphonzo Wesson a.k.a. Zo
- ELIMINATED: Steve Schleinitz a.k.a. Schliz

=== Episode 6 (August 22, 2007) ===
- Genre: game show
- Challenge: create a new dating game show
- Judges: David Hill, Matt Roush, and J. D. Roth (guest judge)
- WINNER: none
- ELIMINATED: Evie Shapiro

=== Episode 7 (August 29, 2007) ===
- Genre: news
- Challenge: produce a feature news story for live broadcast
- Judges: David Hill, Matt Roush, and Lisa Kridos (guest judge)
- WINNER: none
- ELIMINATED: Daniel Hosea

== Reception ==
Variety magazine comments on the low production value but state that they are sufficient, and criticizes some scenes being rushed through.
