= Rather Good Films Ltd =

British film production company

Rather Good Films
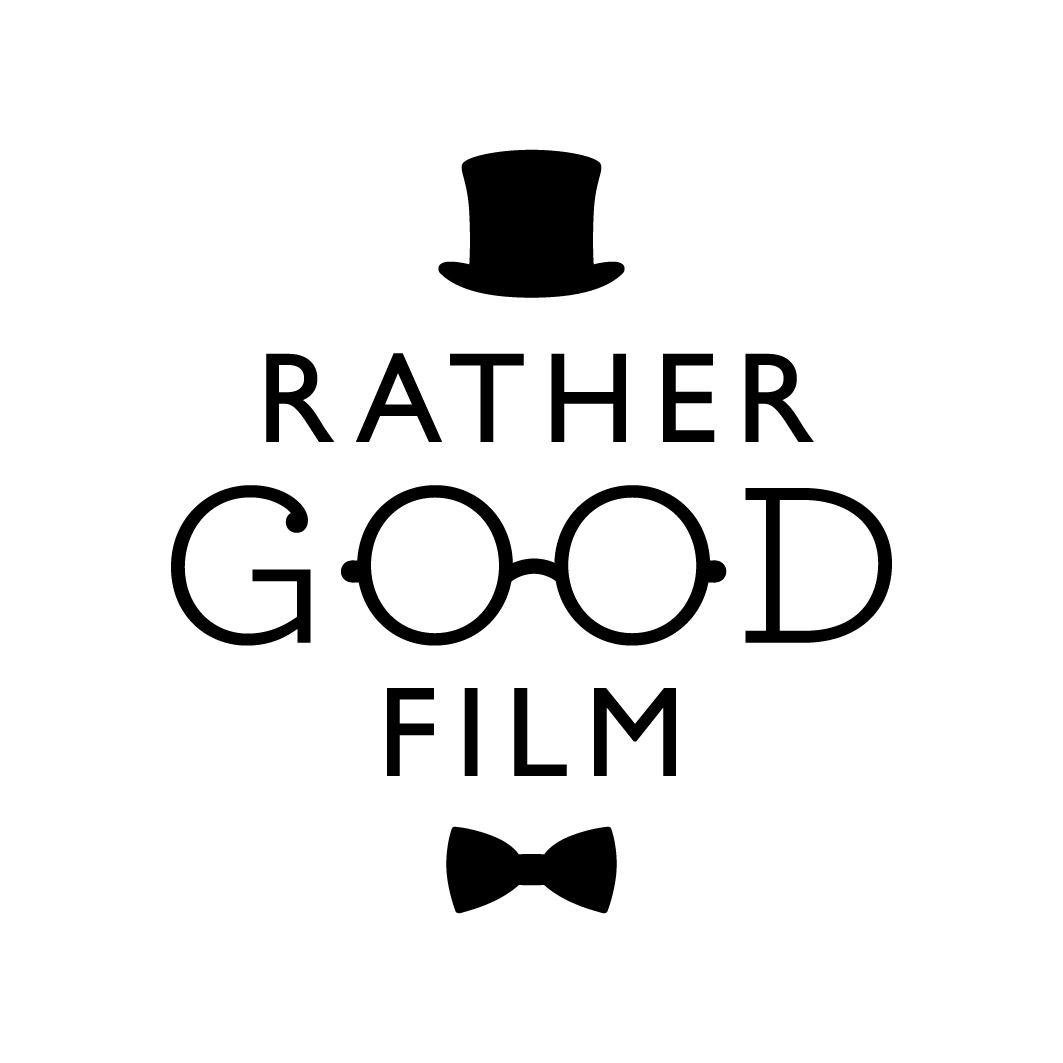
- Website: www.rathergoodfilm.co.uk

Rather Good Films Ltd is an independent British film production company based in London, England. The company was formed in 2013 by Daniel-Konrad Cooper.

== Major productions ==
It has produced or co-produced eleven films, some with international partners, both short and feature films, often comedies. Four of its notable films are:

- Burn Burn Burn 2015
- Dead in a Week (Or Your Money Back) 2018
- The Reckoning 2021
- The Man In The Hat (2020).

However the complete filmography is given below.

== Filmography ==
Film	Year	Director	Notes	Cast
Bella Fleace Gave a Party	2012	Leonora Lonsdale	Short Film. Student Academy Awards Nominee	Siân Phillips
The Hope Rooms	2016	Sam Yates	Short Film. Cork International Film Festival	Ciaran Hinds, Andrew Scott
The Orgy	2018	Sam Baron	Shore Scripts 2017 Short Film Fund Winner	Amit Shah (actor)
Limbo	2018	Rob Silva & Andrew Morris	Short film shot at Warner Bros. Studios, Leavesden and in North Wales	Gethin Anthony
No Day Shall Erase You	2019	Fabio D'Andrea	Music Video with over 1 million views on YouTube	Natalie Dormer
Big Significant Things	2014	Bryan Reisberg	Feature Film in association with Uncorked Productions	Harry Lloyd
Burn Burn Burn	2015	Chanya Button	Feature Film	Laura Carmichael
Vita & Virginia	2018	Chanya Button	Feature Film in association with Mirror Productions	Gemma Arterton
Dead in a Week (Or Your Money Back)	2018	Tom Edmunds	Feature Film in association with Guild of Assassins Ltd	Tom Wilkinson, Aneurin Barnard
The Reckoning	2021 (expected)	Neil Marshall	Feature Film in association with FCFTR Ltd	Sean Pertwee, Steve Waddington
The Man In The Hat	2020	Stephen Warbeck	Feature Film in association with Open Palm Films Ltd	Ciaran Hinds, Stephen Dillane, Maïwenn
