= I Am Not Okay with This =

American television series on Netflix

- Genre: Coming of age Superhero Black comedy
- Based on: I Am Not Okay with This by Charles Forsman
- Developed by: Jonathan Entwistle; Christy Hall
- Directed by: Jonathan Entwistle
- Starring: Sophia Lillis; Wyatt Oleff; Sofia Bryant; Kathleen Rose Perkins
- Narrated by: Sophia Lillis
- Music by: Graham Coxon
- Country of origin: United States
- Original language: English
- No. of seasons: 1
- No. of episodes: 7

Production
- Executive producers: Shawn Levy; Dan Cohen; Dan Levine; Josh Barry; Jonathan Entwistle; Christy Hall
- Producers: Buddy Enright; Rand Geiger
- Cinematography: Justin Brown
- Editors: Yana Gorskaya; Dane McMaster; Varun Viswanath
- Running time: 19–28 minutes
- Production companies: 21 Laps Entertainment; Ceremony Pictures; Raindrop Valley

Original release
- Network: Netflix
- Release: February 26, 2020

I Am Not Okay with This is an American coming-of-age black comedy television series based on the 2017 graphic novel of the same name by Charles Forsman. The series stars Sophia Lillis, Wyatt Oleff, Sofia Bryant, and Kathleen Rose Perkins, and follows the story of an emotionally turbulent teenage girl, Sydney Novak (Lillis), who discovers that she has psychokinetic powers that are triggered by strong emotions.

The series was released on Netflix on February 26, 2020, to generally positive reviews from critics. Netflix originally renewed the series for a second season, but canceled it in August 2020, citing "circumstances related to the COVID-19 pandemic".

== Cast and characters ==
=== Main ===
- Sophia Lillis as Sydney “Syd” Novak, a 17-year-old girl who begins to realize that she has telekinetic powers
- Wyatt Oleff as Stanley "Stan" Barber, Sydney's neighbor and friend
- Sofia Bryant as Dina, Sydney's only best friend, whom she has a crush on
- Kathleen Rose Perkins as Maggie Novak, Sydney's widowed mother

=== Recurring ===
- Aidan Wojtak-Hissong as Liam Novak, Sydney's younger brother
- Richard Ellis as Brad Lewis, Dina's jock boyfriend whom Sydney dislikes
- David Theune as Mr. Peter File, the high school science teacher
- Zachary S. Williams as Ricky Berry, confident, monied jock and Brad's best friend
- Jackson Frazer as Richard Rynard, a bully who torments Liam and whom Sydney confronts
- Sophia Tatum as Jenny, a classmate of Sydney and Dina’s

Photographs of Alex Lawther and Jessica Barden are briefly used as an easter egg to their respectively portrayed characters James and Alyssa from The End of the F***ing World (2017–2019), the events of which are intended to be taking place simultaneously with those of I Am Not Okay with This.

== Episodes ==
No.	Title	Directed by	Teleplay by	Original release date
1	"Dear Diary..."	Jonathan Entwistle	Jonathan Entwistle & Christy Hall	February 26, 2020
Sydney Novak is a 17-year-old living with her mother and younger brother a year after the death of her father. Sydney is frustrated that she and her mother never talk about her father's suicide, and the two constantly argue. Her guidance counselor recommends Sydney start a diary to channel her anger, and Sydney reluctantly agrees. Sydney meets up with her best friend Dina, who has begun dating jock Bradley Lewis. Suddenly, Bradley's nose starts bleeding, which Sydney is almost convinced was her doing. On her way home, she runs into Stanley Barber, her neighbor, who suggests they should hang out soon, to which Sydney unenthusiastically agrees. At home, she looks after her young brother, Liam, who tells her about a kid who got into trouble for punching someone. Later that night, after a cold discussion with her mother, Sydney sits frustrated on the floor of her room when part of the wall cracks behind her.
2	"The Master of One F**k"	Jonathan Entwistle	Christy Hall	February 26, 2020
The next morning, Sydney convinces herself the wall collapsing was merely a result of the house being old. Her mother tasks her with getting groceries and Sydney asks Dina if she would give her a ride after school. However, Dina admits that she's going to the pep rally and the football game, leaving Sydney feeling betrayed. She takes a walk, throwing some stones and unintentionally knocking over a sign, startling herself. She then recruits Stanley for his car, but falls short of money to pay for groceries and begins to put food back. While Sydney is attempting to calm down in an aisle of the store, the food in said aisle falls off the shelves, causing Sydney to run out of the store after Stan walks over to check on her. Stan believes that Sydney has had a panic attack, and talks to her outside. Afterwards, they go to the football game and then to Stan's house. Stan kisses Sydney, and they end up having sex.
3	"The Party's Over"	Jonathan Entwistle	Liz Elverenli	February 26, 2020
Sydney confides in Dina she had sex with Stan the night before, but hides her true feelings from Dina. Afterwards, she walks Liam home and they encounter Liam's school bully, Richard. Sydney confronts him, but when her powers fail during this confrontation, she merely gives him a warning to back off. At home, Sydney goes into the basement in order to find puzzles for Liam, a part of the house in which Sydney has not been since her father's death. Feelings of grief overwhelm her and she has a panic attack, shaking the house and killing Liam's pet hedgehog. Later, Sydney goes to a party and finally gets the chance to spend time with Dina, but Brad comes and takes her away. Later, Stan asks her to homecoming, to which she gives him a reluctant yes. Sydney finds an upset Dina, who is alone in a room after an intense argument with Brad. Sydney comforts Dina, after which Sydney kisses her. Dina is unnerved by the kiss, and Sydney leaves in a rush and heads to a spot alone in the woods. She screams, causing the trees surrounding her to fall to the ground.
4	"Stan by Me"	Jonathan Entwistle	Tripper Clancy	February 26, 2020
Following Sydney's incident in the forest, she realizes Stan saw everything and she swears him to secrecy before running off. The next day, Sydney's mother asks her to look after Liam again. She and Sydney get into another argument, in which Sydney's mother tells Sydney her father wasn't who she thought he was. Later, Sydney hurries out of class after almost triggering her powers again, but she is able to suppress them by recalling happy memories. Dina runs after her and asks if she's okay, and if they can talk about their kiss, but Sydney deflects and says everything is fine. Sydney goes to the bowling alley and meets with Stan, who tries to help her understand her powers. She admits to Stan that the trees blew down because she kissed someone at the party, and that her powers seem to be tied to her emotions. Stan then tries to trigger Sydney's powers by angering her, but in the process, Sydney almost hits Stan with bowling balls, becoming genuinely angry. While Sydney is walking home, she believes she sees a figure following behind her.
5	"Another Day in Paradise"	Jonathan Entwistle	Tripper Clancy	February 26, 2020
During class, Dina and Brad are caught cheating on a test and given detention, and Sydney and Stan are given detention for protesting this. The four of them are joined in detention by their classmate Jenny. They are tasked with cleaning the bleachers, but Jenny suggests that they play "Fuck, Marry, Kill" instead while unsupervised. Sydney angrily leaves the room and runs to the library after Jenny suggests she isn't "fuckable", subsequently losing control of her powers and knocking over all the bookshelves. She and Stan recruit Dina to help steal the security footage by telling Dina the tapes show them having sex in the library. The three devise a plan and break into the office, successfully stealing the footage. In the locker room, Sydney overhears Jenny and Brad's conversation, learning that they had sex and Brad cheated on Dina. When Dina walks in, Sydney tells her, despite Brad's pleas; Dina and Brad therefore break up. Sydney confides in Stan about what happened in the library: something else was making the lights flicker, and she felt that she was not alone.
6	"Like Father, Like Daughter"	Jonathan Entwistle	Christy Hall	February 26, 2020
After watching the security footage, Sydney questions her sanity before angrily snapping at Stan. At school, Brad confronts Sydney, angry that she caused Dina to break up with him. In anger, Sydney causes the lockers behind him to slam open. Later, Dina confronts Sydney about what was actually on the tape, but Sydney refuses to tell her. At Liam's school, he tries talking to his crush, Veronica, before Richard punches him. At lunch, Ricky Berry tells Brad about a rumor about him, while Stan tries to make plans with Sydney about homecoming. She gets angry at him, telling him that she doesn't care about homecoming and he asks someone else. Sydney tells her counselor about the man she saw. Her counselor convinces her they were hallucinations of her father. At home, Liam calls Sydney out for her terrible behavior lately, citing his black eye from Richard and her horrible attitude. In an attempt to get more answers, Sydney goes through her father's belongings in the basement, where her mother describes her father as having had similar experiences to Sydney's. When Sydney goes to write in her diary, she finds it missing.
7	"Deepest, Darkest Secret"	Jonathan Entwistle	Christy Hall & Jenna Westover	February 26, 2020
The next morning, Sydney makes amends with her brother. In gym, Dina admits she feels distanced from Sydney. Sydney tells her about her "grief hallucinations". Afterwards, Sydney tells Dina she and Stan are not going to homecoming. Dina asks Sydney to go with her, since neither of them have dates. At the dance, Sydney talks with Stan, who admits his feelings for her. Sydney answers she only sees him as a friend. Stan asks whether Dina knows about her powers, to which Sydney says that only he does. While dancing together, Dina and Sydney talk about their kiss, and Dina tells Sydney she "didn't not like" it. While the homecoming king and queen are being announced, Brad interrupts, and it is revealed he took Sydney's diary. He exposes Sydney's feelings for Dina and her recent problems at home. Before he can expose her powers, in anger, Sydney blows up his head, killing him. Shocked, Sydney runs off into the woods, climbing a watch tower there when a man appears from the shadows. When Sydney asks if she should be afraid of him, he replies she should not be afraid, but everyone should be afraid of them.

== Production ==
On December 12, 2018, Netflix announced it had given the production a series order for an eight-episode first season, of which only seven were produced. The series was created by Jonathan Entwistle and Christy Hall, who executive produced alongside Shawn Levy, Dan Levine, Dan Cohen, and Josh Barry. Entwistle also directed the series. Alongside the series announcement, it was announced that Sophia Lillis, Sofia Bryant, Wyatt Oleff, and Kathleen Rose Perkins would star in the series, with Aidan Wojtak-Hissong and Richard Ellis recurring in the series. Filming commenced in Pittsburgh in June 2019. The town of Brownsville, Pennsylvania served as a primary location, while Wilmerding's Westinghouse Arts Academy Charter School was used as the high school exterior. The series was released on February 26, 2020. The series was renewed by Netflix for a second season. On August 21, 2020, Netflix canceled the series after one season, citing "COVID-related circumstances."

== Reception ==
On the review aggregator website Rotten Tomatoes, the series has an 87% approval rating with 67 reviews, with an average rating of 6.82/10. The website's critical consensus reads, "As awkward and charming as adolescence, but with twice the supernatural twists, I Am Not Okay With This' first season at times veers into shallow territory, but Sophia Lillis' strong performance keeps it afloat." Review aggregator Metacritic gave the series a score of 68 out of 100 based on 16 critics, indicating "generally favorable reviews". The series was nominated for "Best Adaptation from Comic Book/Graphic Novel" at the 2020 Harvey Awards.
