= Mark, Mary & Some Other People =

- Theatrical release poster
- Directed by: Hannah Marks
- Written by: Hannah Marks
- Produced by: Hannah Marks; Kelly Williams; Jonathan Duffy; Jon Lullo; Brendan Walter; Stephen Braun; Peter Williams
- Starring: Hayley Law; Ben Rosenfield; Odessa A'zion; Nik Dodani; Matt Shively; Sofia Bryant; Gillian Jacobs; Joe Lo Truglio; Steve Little; Kelli Berglund; Haley Ramm; Peter Williams; Lea Thompson
- Cinematography: Casey Stolberg
- Edited by: Andy Holton
- Music by: Patrick Stump
- Production companies: Ten Acre Films; Bee-Hive Productions; Crush Pictures
- Distributed by: Vertical Entertainment
- Release dates: June 10, 2021 (Tribeca); November 5, 2021 (United States)
- Running time: 90 minutes
- Country: United States
- Language: English

Mark, Mary & Some Other People is a 2021 American comedy film, written, directed, and produced by Hannah Marks. It stars Hayley Law, Ben Rosenfield, Odessa A'zion, Nik Dodani, Matt Shively, Sofia Bryant, Gillian Jacobs, Joe Lo Truglio, Steve Little, Kelli Berglund, Haley Ramm, Peter Williams and Lea Thompson.

It had its world premiere at the Tribeca Film Festival on June 10, 2021.

== Cast ==
- Hayley Law as Mary
- Ben Rosenfield as Mark
- Odessa A'zion as Lana
- Nik Dodani as Kyle
- Matt Shively as AJ
- Sofia Bryant as Tori
- Gillian Jacobs as Dr. Jacobs
- Joe Lo Truglio as Chris
- Steve Little as Officiant
- Kelli Berglund as Bunny
- Haley Ramm as Alexandra
- Peter Williams as Aaron
- Lea Thompson as Aunty Carol
- Maggie Wheeler as Lisa
- Esther Povitsky as Esther

== Production ==
In February 2020, it was announced Hayley Law, Ben Rosenfield, Odessa A'zion, Nik Dodani, Matt Shively, Sofia Bryant, Gillian Jacobs, Joe Lo Truglio, Steve Little, Kelli Berglund, Maggie Wheeler, Haley Ramm, Peter Williams and Lea Thompson had joined the cast of the film, with Hannah Marks directing from a screenplay she wrote.

Principal photography began in December 2019.

== Release ==
It had its world premiere at the Tribeca Film Festival on June 10, 2021. Prior to, Vertical Entertainment acquired distribution rights to the film.

== Soundtrack ==
The rock band Green Day confirmed that their single Holy Toledo! was used for the movie, via Instagram.

== Reception ==
Rotten Tomatoes reported an approval rating of 57% based on 21 reviews with an average rating of 6.3/10. The website's critics consensus reads, "Mark, Mary & Some Other People offers an amusing enough diversion for rom-com fans, albeit one that starts strong and fades at the finish."
