= Laura Carmichael =

British actress (born 1986)

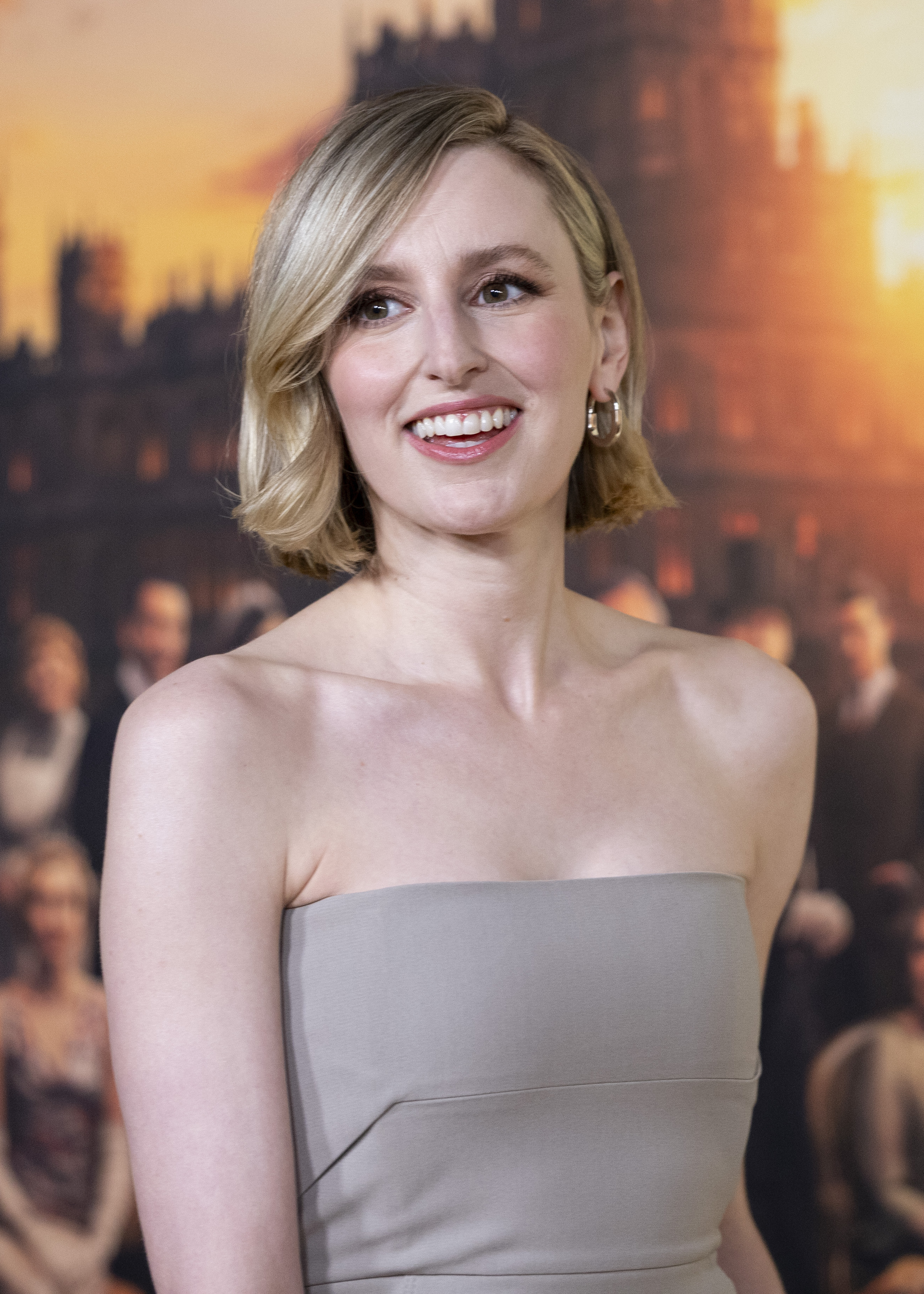
- Carmichael in 2025
- Born: 16 July 1986 (age 40); Southampton, Hampshire, England
- Education: Bristol Old Vic Theatre School
- Occupation: Actress
- Years active: 2009–present
- Partner: Michael C. Fox (2014–present)
- Children: 1

Laura Carmichael (born 16 July 1986) is an English actress, most widely known for her performance as Lady Edith Crawley in the ITV (UK) and PBS (US) television period drama series Downton Abbey. Her other work includes television series Marcella (2016), and the feature film A United Kingdom (2016).

== Early life ==
Carmichael was born in Southampton, England. She is the middle of three daughters.

She was educated at Shirley Junior School, The Mountbatten School, and Peter Symonds College. Carmichael attended the Bristol Old Vic Theatre School in Bristol, graduating in 2007, before spending two years in various odd jobs, including a teaching assistant, receptionist, and nanny while going to tiny auditions in fringe theatres.

== Career ==
=== Film and television ===
Between 2010 and 2015, she played Lady Edith Crawley in Downton Abbey, a role which brought her worldwide recognition. Commenting on gaining the role of Lady Edith, Carmichael says, "I don't know how it happened with Downton; it really was a miracle. I think it was because I had a good drama school on my CV and they had struggled to find someone for Edith, because she had to be quite different from the two other girls Lady Mary and Lady Sybil". Yet, the actress has enjoyed the role, "When I was at drama school I had quite a lot of wet, ingénue parts, so I'm delighted because it is much more fun playing her. It's interesting how one role can make people see you differently".

Other television roles include parts in The Heart of Thomas Hardy, and End of Our Street. In 2011, she appeared in Tinker Tailor Soldier Spy, and she played Henriette in the 2014 film of Madame Bovary.

Carmichael starred in the 2015 British black comedy feature film Burn, Burn, Burn, a coming-of-age tale, inspired by the Jack Kerouac novel On the Road published in 1957. The directorial debut of Chanya Button, it follows the fictional story of two girls, Seph (Carmichael) and Alex (Chloe Pirrie), taking a road trip to follow the instructions of their close friend Dan, who has died and given them instructions where to scatter his ashes. The ashes (stored in tupperware in the glove compartment) keep diminishing in quantity as the trip progresses. The film had its World premiere at BFI London Film Festival 2015.

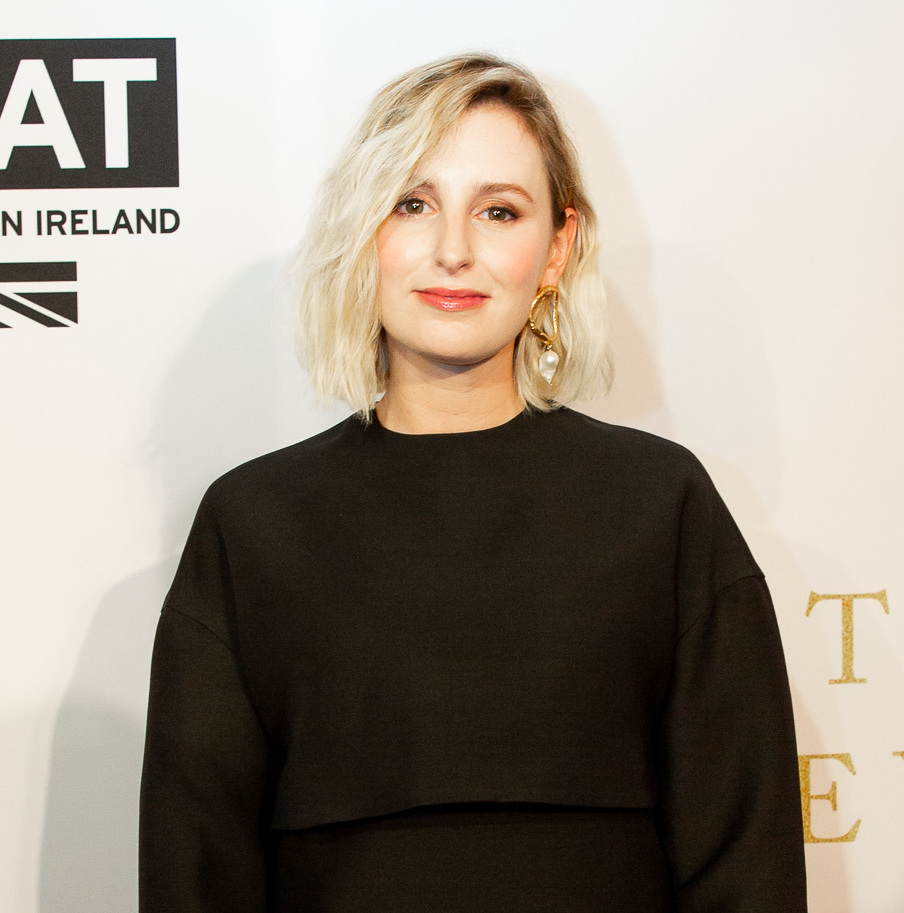
Carmichael at the U.S. premiere of the film Downton Abbey hosted by the British Embassy in 2019

In 2016, Carmichael starred in ITV's television crime drama series, Marcella, as Maddy Stevenson. Marcella focuses on a British Metropolitan police detective and single mother's return to the murder squad, the first English show by Swedish screenwriter Hans Rosenfeldt, who created the Scandinavian television series The Bridge.

In 2016, Carmichael portrayed Muriel Williams in A United Kingdom, a political yet romantic drama, also starring Rosamund Pike and David Oyelowo. The film saw Carmichael immersing herself in the early days of 1940s apartheid. She played Muriel, the sister of Ruth Williams, the Englishwoman who (in real life) challenged colonial racism to marry Seretse Khama, who would become King of Bechuanaland (now Botswana) in 1948.

From 2020 to 2022, Carmichael had a starring role in The Secrets She Keeps, an Australian psychological thriller drama television series, adapted from Michael Robotham's novel of the same name. She portrayed Agatha Fyfle, a crafty and troubled woman obsessed with pregnancy and babies, who kidnaps an infant.

=== Theatre ===
Carmichael made her West End debut in Uncle Vanya opposite Anna Friel and Samuel West in October 2012. She played Arabella in The Fitzrovia Radio Hour at The Underglobe Theatre in early 2013.

In 2016, Carmichael played Madam in Jamie Lloyd's production of The Maids at the Trafalgar Studios in London's West End, co-starring Uzo Aduba.

Carmichael's previous substantial role was in 2011, in David Hare's Plenty at the Sheffield Crucible Theatre with co-stars Anna Friel as Yelena and Ken Stott as Vanya.

She played Laura in Reasons for Living as part of the 2009 Scratch Festival at Battersea Arts Centre. In late 2009, she played Miranda in a touring production of Shakespeare's The Tempest.

== Personal life ==
Carmichael lives in Camden, London.

Carmichael has been in a relationship with her Downton Abbey co-star Michael C. Fox since 2014, making it public in 2016. Their first child, a son, was born in 2022.

== Filmography ==
=== Film ===
Year	Title	Role	Notes
2011	Tinker Tailor Soldier Spy	Sal	
2014	Madame Bovary	Henrietta	
2015	Burn Burn Burn	Seph	
2016	A United Kingdom	Muriel Williams	
2019	Downton Abbey	Edith Pelham, Marchioness of Hexham	
2022	Downton Abbey: A New Era	Edith Pelham, Marchioness of Hexham	
2025	Downton Abbey: The Grand Finale	Edith Pelham, Marchioness of Hexham	
TBA	A Night at Claridge's		A Whit Stillman film, in production as at November 2026.

=== Television ===
Year	Title	Role	Notes
2009	House at the End of Our Street	Yvonne	Television film
2010	The Heart of Thomas Hardy	Hardy's Maid	Television film
2010–2015	Downton Abbey	Lady Edith Crawley	Main role
2016	Marcella	Maddy Stevenson	Recurring role; 4 episodes
2017	Man in an Orange Shirt	Daphne Talbot	Episode #1.1
2019–2020	The Spanish Princess	Margaret Pole, Countess of Salisbury	Main role
2020–2022	The Secrets She Keeps	Agatha	Main role

== Theatre ==
Year	Title	Role	Notes
2009	Reasons for Living	Laura	BAC
2009	The Tempest	Miranda/Ariel	UK tour
2011	Plenty	Louise/Dorcas	Sheffield Crucible Theatre
2012	Uncle Vanya	Sonya	Vaudeville Theatre
2013	The Fitzrovia Radio Hour	Arabella	Underglobe Theatre
2016	The Maids	Madam	Trafalgar Studios
2017	Apologia	Trudi	Trafalgar Studios
2023	Private Lives	Amanda	Donmar Warehouse
