= Dead in a Week or Your Money Back =

- Film poster
- Directed by: Tom Edmunds
- Written by: Tom Edmunds
- Produced by: Daniel-Konrad Cooper; Nick Clark Windo
- Starring: Tom Wilkinson; Aneurin Barnard; Freya Mavor; Christopher Eccleston; Marion Bailey
- Cinematography: Luke Bryant
- Edited by: Tariq Anwar
- Music by: Guy Garvey, Pete Jobson, Paul Saunderson
- Production company: Rather Good Films Ltd
- Distributed by: Republic Film Distribution; Altitude Film Sales
- Release dates: 27 June 2018 (Edinburgh); 16 November 2018 (Odeon Cinemas UK)
- Running time: 90 minutes
- Country: United Kingdom
- Language: English

Dead in a Week or Your Money Back (stylized as Dead in a Week (Or Your Money Back)) is a 2018 British black comedy film, the directorial debut of Tom Edmunds. The film stars Tom Wilkinson as an aging hitman and Aneurin Barnard as his prospective last contract.

The film premiered at the 2018 Edinburgh International Film Festival and also screened at the Rome International Film Festival, ahead of an exclusive release in Odeon Cinemas UK, by Republic Film Distribution.

== Premise ==
The plot follows Leslie, an aging hitman on the brink of retirement, who has not met his annual quota with the British Guild of Assassins. His officious boss, Harvey, sets him a deadline that forces Leslie to resort to desperate measures – hanging out at suicide hotspots to try and pick up some extra business. On the wrong side of Chelsea Bridge, he meets struggling writer William. Leslie offers an unconventional deal: dead in a week or your money back. However, with the deal signed, William finally finds some sense of security, leading him to wonder if the deal is what he really wanted.

== Cast ==
- Tom Wilkinson as Leslie
- Aneurin Barnard as William
- Freya Mavor as Ellie
- Christopher Eccleston as Harvey
- Marion Bailey as Penny
- Velibor Topic as Ivan
- Nigel Lindsay as Brian

== Reception ==
The film was well supported on its release in UK Cinemas, backed by Stephen Fry, who became an Executive Producer, and The Samaritans. The critical reception was mixed. The Hollywood Reporter praised Tom Wilkinson's depiction of the hitman "Although Leslie proves quite ruthless and skilled at his evil profession, the veteran actor manages to make him somehow lovable." Perhaps surprisingly the film had a much wider theatrical release in Italy taking almost $700k at the box office. The film was also released by Netflix in 2019.
