= Sofia Bryant =

American-Finnish actress

- Born: December 27, 1999 (age 26); New York City, New York
- Occupation: Actress
- Years active: 2015–present

Sofia Bryant is an American-Finnish actress. She is best known for playing Dina in I Am Not Okay with This, Tasha in The Girl in the Woods, and Anika in The Summer I Turned Pretty.

== Early life ==
Harris was born in New York City, New York to a Finnish mother. She moved to Helsinki when she was three before returning to New York when she was nine. She has fond memories of Finland, particularly the scenic winters. She got interest in acting from doing theatre in middle school.

== Career ==
Her breakout role came playing Dina in the comedy series I Am Not Okay with This. Her next recurring role came playing Tasha in the horror series The Girl in the Woods. Her biggest role so far has been playing Anika in the drama series The Summer I Turned Pretty.

== Personal life ==
One of her main hobbies outside of acting is making different types of objects out of clay. She is a big fan of stop motion movies, particularly Coraline. She also likes to hang out with her friends, which helps her relax.

== Filmography ==
=== Film ===
Year	Title	Role	Notes
2015	Birdboy: The Forgotten Children	Sandra	
2018	Suspicion	Ellie Goodman	
2021	Mark, Mary & Some Other People	Tori	
2021	27 Candles	Cheyenne	Short
2022	Never Better	Terese	
2023	Little Dixie	Nell Alexander	
2023	Deadly DILF	Elysium	
2025	Hungry	Tameeka	

=== Television ===
Year	Title	Role	Notes
2016	The Good Wife	Yesha Dargis	Episode; Shoot
2018	Blue Bloods	Female Explorer	Episode; The Brave
2019	The Code	Janea Kroll	Episode; Smoke-Pit
2020	I Am Not Okay with This	Dina	7 episodes
2022	The Girl in the Woods	Tasha	8 episodes
2022	Bloodthirsty Hearts	Blake	8 episodes
2025	Found	Zuri Mitchell	Episode; Missing While Mathced
2025	The Summer I Turned Pretty	Anika	6 episodes
