= The Man in the Hat =

- Film poster
- Directed by: John-Paul Davidson; Stephen Warbeck
- Written by: John-Paul Davidson; Stephen Warbeck
- Produced by: Daniel-Konrad Cooper; Dominic Dromgoole
- Cinematography: Kaname Onoyama
- Music by: Stephen Warbeck
- Production companies: Open Palm Films; Rather Good Films
- Distributed by: Kaleidoscope Film Distribution
- Release date: 18 September 2020
- Running time: 95 minutes
- Country: United Kingdom
- Languages: English & French

The Man in the Hat is a 2020 British independent comedy film, and the directorial debut of composer Stephen Warbeck. The film is a visually-driven road trip comedy, produced by Open Palm Films and Rather Good Films Ltd and represented by Kaleidoscope Film Distribution.

The film was released in United Kingdom cinemas on 18 September 2020.

Ciarán Hinds described the film as "a little journey" with its "own heartbeat, unlike anything else", emphasizing the gentle, observational nature of the story.

The Guardian described it as "a Francophile fantasy" and "a whimsical French car chase", while The Upcoming praised it as "a perfect example of the kind of pleasant diversion one should seek during these trying times".

== Plot ==
The film follows an enigmatic man on a leisurely and often whimsical road trip through the French countryside. Along the way, he encounters a series of eccentric characters, from old friends to strangers met by chance, each contributing to the story's playful and unpredictable rhythm.

With minimal dialogue, the narrative relies on visual storytelling and the protagonist's subtle interactions, gestures, and reactions. He navigates absurd situations, unexpected detours, and small adventures, all infused with a lighthearted, surreal charm. Rather than focusing on a particular destination, the journey itself—with its fleeting encounters, humorous episodes, and the beauty of the surrounding landscapes—forms the heart of the film.

== Production ==
The film was co-directed and written by John-Paul Davidson and Stephen Warbeck in his directorial debut. It was produced by Daniel-Konrad Cooper and Dominic Dromgoole through Open Palm Films and Rather Good Films. Filming took place on location in the French countryside, emphasizing visual storytelling and minimal dialogue. Cinematography was handled by Kaname Onoyama.

== Reception ==
The film received generally positive reviews, with critics highlighting its whimsical tone and gentle humor. The Guardian described it as "a Francophile fantasy" and "a whimsical French car chase", while The Upcoming praised it as "a perfect example of the kind of pleasant diversion one should seek during these trying times".

== Cast ==
- Ciarán Hinds as The Thin Man
- Stephen Dillane as The Damp Man
- Maïwenn as The Biker
- Brigitte Roüan as The Hotel Manager
- Sasha Hails as The Woman
- Muna Otaru as The Chef
- Mark Padmore as The Singing Man
