= Charles Forsman =

American comics writer

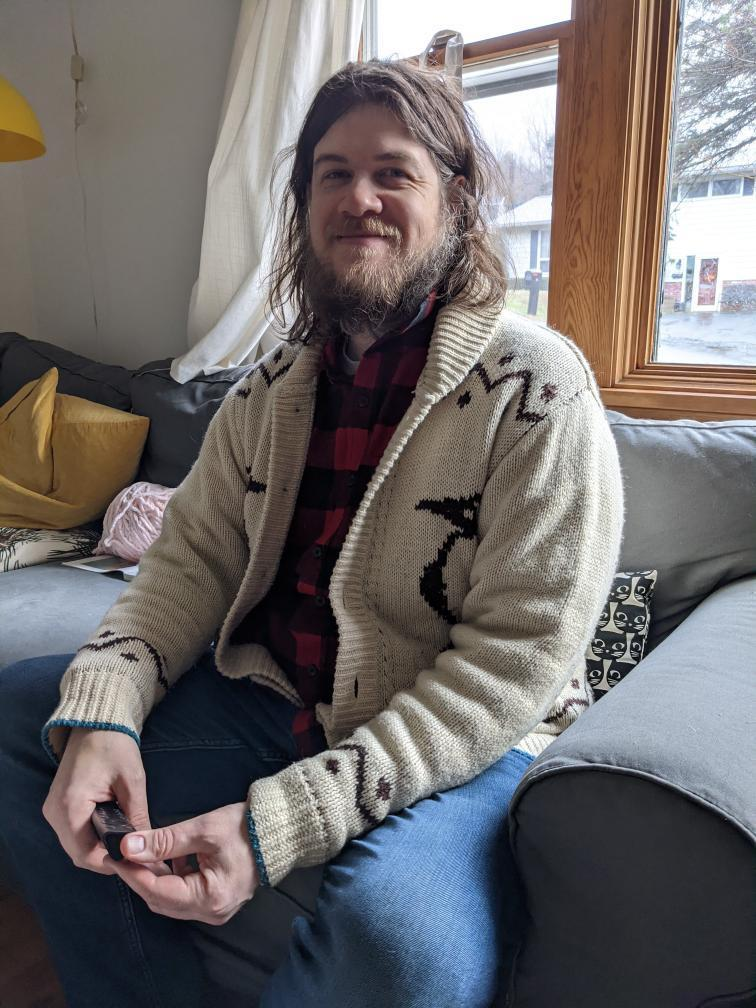
- Forsman in 2020
- Born: 1982 (age 43–44) Mechanicsburg, Pennsylvania, U.S.
- Areas: Cartoonist, Writer, Artist
- Notable works: The End of the F***ing World; I Am Not Okay with This

Charles Forsman (born 1982) is an American cartoonist. Combining a simple drawing style with dark and realistic themes, Forsman continues the tradition of alternative comics.

Forsman's father died when Charles was 11 years old. Forsman obtained a degree from the Center for Cartoon Studies in 2008.

== Career ==
His self-published comic Snake Oil won the 2008 Ignatz Awards for Outstanding Comic and Outstanding Series. His graphic novel The End of the Fucking World, "a modern ballad of angst and murder", won the 2013 Ignatz Award for Outstanding Minicomic and was adapted in 2017 into a British TV series of the same name that ran for two seasons.

The End of the Fucking World, originally published under Forsman's imprint, Oily Comics, was collected by Fantagraphics.

I Am Not Okay with This and Celebrated Summer were published by Fantagraphics. All his other works, such as Revenger or Slasher, were either self-published, published by small publishers, or sold directly to online readers via Patreon. Forsman has said that Revenger was influenced by the Marvel Comics series The Punisher War Journal.

On June 10, 2019, it was announced that Netflix would produce a seven-episode series based on I Am Not Okay with This. The series premiered on February 26, 2020. Originally renewed for a second season, Netflix canceled the series in August 2020, citing "circumstances related to the COVID-19 pandemic".

== Bibliography ==
- Snake Oil (Oily Comics, 2007)
- The End of the Fucking World (Oily Comics, 16 issues, September 2011 - February 2013)
- The End of the Fucking World (Fantagraphics Books, 2011–2012) — collected from the Oily Comics series
- Celebrated Summer (Fantagraphics Books, 2014)
- Revenger #1–5 (Oily Comics, 2015)
- Hobo Mom (with Max de Radiguès) (Fantagraphics Books, 2015)
- Slasher (Floating World Comics/Alternative Comics, 2017)
- I Am Not Okay With This (Fantagraphics Books, 2017)

== Adaptations ==
- TEOTFW (short film; 2014)
- The End of the F***ing World (British television series; 2017–2019)
- I Am Not Okay with This (American television series; 2020)
