= Crypt TV =

American entertainment company

The Crypt Holdings, Inc.
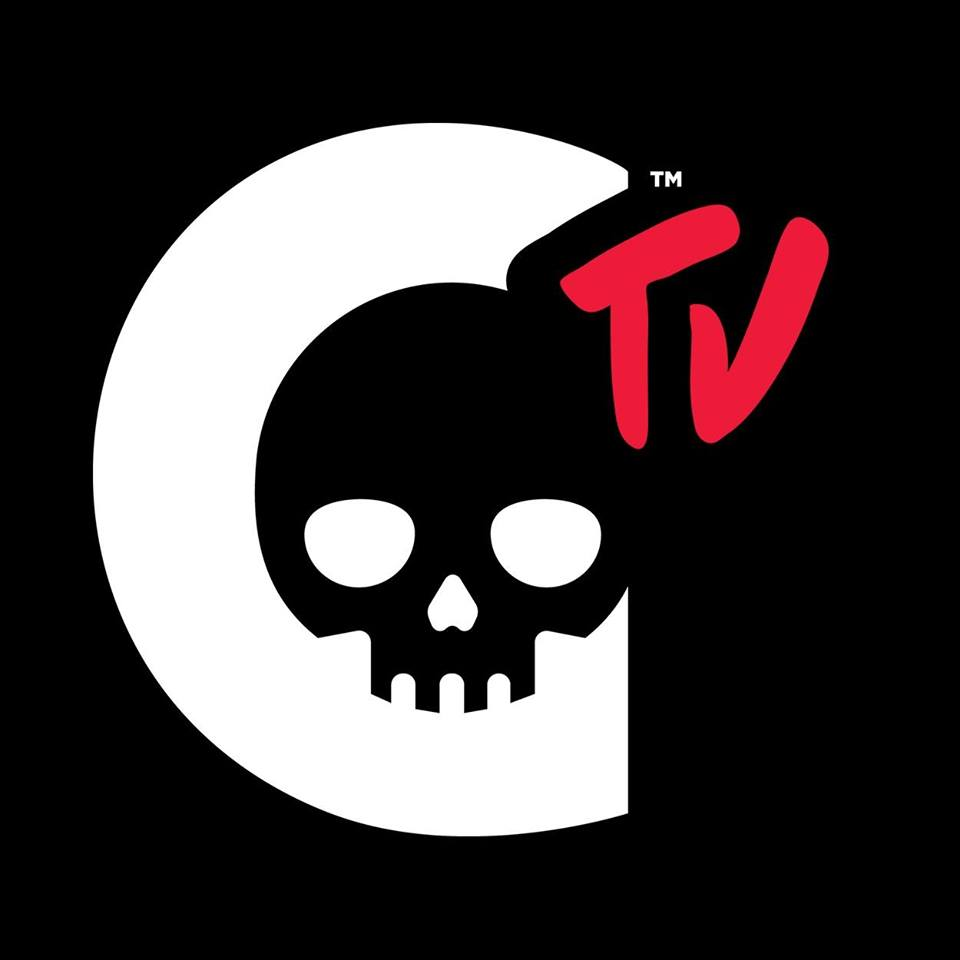
- Trade name: Crypt TV
- Type: Subsidiary
- Industry: Film; television; online
- Founded: September 18, 2014; 12 years ago
- Founder: Jack Davis; Eli Roth
- Headquarters: Los Angeles, California U.S.
- Key people: Jack Davis (CEO); Darren Brandl (COO); Kate Krantz (CCO); Jason Blum
- Parent: Brat TV
- Website: crypttv.com at the Wayback Machine (archived September 27, 2024)

The Crypt Holdings, Inc., doing business as Crypt TV, is an American entertainment company founded by Jack Davis and filmmaker Eli Roth in September 2014, focused on the creation and distribution of horror-themed digital content with an emphasis on recurring monsters and characters in linked universes. Its creation was backed by producer Jason Blum and Blumhouse Productions.

Crypt specializes in short-form online horror videos, including characters that have gone viral such as The Birch and The Look-See. The company has a combined social media following of 5 million likes on Facebook and 3.41 million subscribers on YouTube.

== History ==
Jack Davis, who was still attending Duke University at the time, met filmmaker Eli Roth at a dinner party in 2013. The pair kept in touch, discussing how to make scary entertainment effective on phone screens. Crypt TV was formed when Davis and Roth launched a "six-second scare" contest together in October 2014 as "a way to test to see if you could really make great scary content in short form on mobile" according to Davis. The contest was featured on Good Morning America and subsequently went viral, receiving over 15,000 submissions. Roth showed the contest to horror film producer Jason Blum, who was looking for a digital strategy for Blumhouse Productions, and Blum became Crypt TV's first investor. The company was officially launched in April 2015 in Los Angeles with just three employees: Davis as CEO, Darren Brandl as COO, and Kate Krantz as CCO.

In March 2017, Crypt TV raised $3.5 million in funding with the lead being taken by venture capital fund Lerer Hippeau Ventures, a backer of BuzzFeed. The company has raised $6.2 million from past investors. In September 2017, the company won at the Streamy Awards in the "Action or Sci-Fi" category.

In September 2018, Crypt TV announced that they had partnered with Facebook Watch to produce and release a 15-episode series about The Birch, one of their most popular IPs, which was released exclusively on the streaming site on October 19, 2019. In July 2019, it was announced that The Birch was the first part of a five-series deal between Crypt and Facebook Watch, with each series receiving a ten-episode season. Stereoscope and Kinderfänger respectively premiered in August and October 2020, and the remaining two series, Mira Mira and Woman in the Book, respectively premiered in January and June 2021.

On May 29, 2020, it was announced that Crypt TV would partner with Indian production company Abundantia Entertainment for Chhorii, a Hindi remake of acclaimed Marathi horrory-mystery film Lapachhapi. Jack Davis and Vikram Malhotra would produce as Crypt TV and Abundantia's respective representatives, and Vishal Furia, director of the Marathi film from which Chhorii was based, was brought on as director. The film follows Nushrratt Bharuccha as Sakshi Devi, a pregnant city girl who moves to a secluded village and fights evil spirits to protect her unborn baby. Principal photography began on November 25, 2020, in Madhya Pradesh, and filming was wrapped up in December 2020. The film was officially released on Amazon Prime Video on November 26, 2021.

In May 2021, Crypt TV licenses made their first appearance in a video game, with three characters appearing as third-party downloadable content skins in the game Dead by Daylight by Behaviour Interactive. In April 2021, it was announced that Crypt had struck a deal with the NBC streaming site Peacock to produce an eight-episode series based on another of Crypt's more recent IPs, The Girl in the Woods. The series premiered exclusively on Peacock in October 2021, with Krysten Ritter directing the first four episodes.

In December 2021, it was announced that a sequel to Chhorii was officially in development. Tentatively titled Chhorii 2, the sequel is set to pick up where the original film left off, with several characters returning to star. Vishal Furia was set to return as director, and Nushrratt Bharuccha would reprise her role as the film's protagonist. Bhushan Kumar, Krishan Kumar, Vikram Malhotra, Jack Davis and Shikhaa Sharma would return as producers for the sequel.

In May 2022, it was announced via Deadline that Crypt TV was set to produce its first English-language feature film, titled The Angry Black Girl and Her Monster. The film will be directed and written by Bomani J. Story with Jack Davis and Darren Brandl joining Story as producers, and Jasmine Johnson and Jeremey Elliott on as executive producers. A reimagining of Mary Shelley's Frankenstein, the film would follow a teenage girl named Vicaria who brings her brother back from the dead, only for him to return as a vengeance-seeking monster. It was later announced that Laya DeLeon Hayes was set to star as Vicaria, and would be joined by Denzel Whitaker as her co-star. Production for the film began in June 2022, and filming was completed on July 1, 2022. A release date for the film has not been confirmed.

On June 22, 2022, it was announced that Screen Gems had acquired the rights to Crypt TV's next feature film, currently titled Island of the Dolls. The film will be based on the true story of La Isla de las Munecas, located in Mexico City. Jack Davis and Darren Brandl are set to produce the film alongside Spark & Riot's Ana de Diego, and Screen Gems's Michael Bitar will overseeing production. The producers worked with Barrera's descendants to keep the creative rights, and "look to tell the story with respect to the heritage of the island and Barrera, with the family contributing his original journals and more". Since the announcement, a writer and director have not been attached to the project.

On October 14, 2022, it was announced that Crypt TV had partnered with Meta to create a thirty-minute, 180-degree VR experience, and that Vanessa Hudgens and Will Sasso would star in the project. The experience, titled "Haunted House: Trick-VR-Treat", premiered at 6:00 PM PST on October 21, 2022, via Meta's Horizon Worlds and Meta Quest TV.

On November 30, 2022, it was announced via Crypt TV's Twitter account that production on Chhorii 2 had officially begun.

On April 4, 2024 The Faceless Lady premiered on Meta Horizon Worlds. The show was the entertainment industry's first-ever scripted original live-action VR series. The majority of the series was directed veteran Crypt TV filmmaker John William Ross (Grimcutty).

== Intellectual property ==
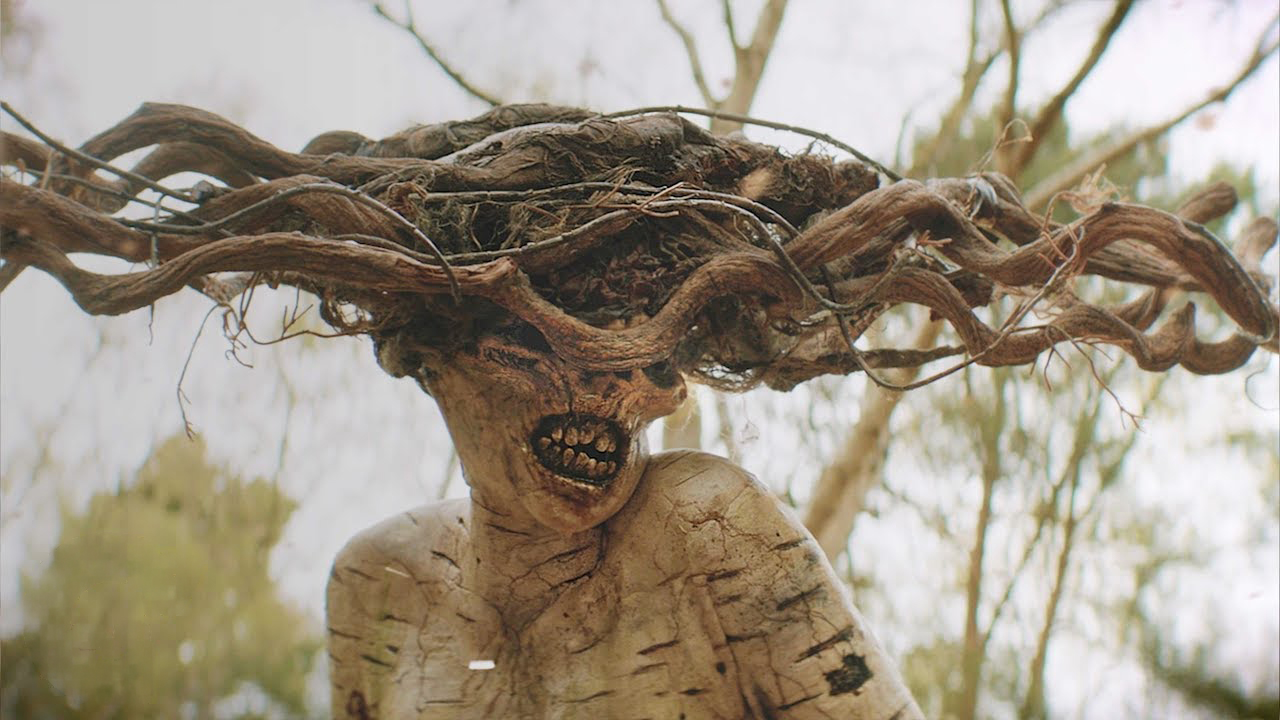
The Birch

Crypt releases an average of 30 videos every month, building its audience through Facebook and YouTube and averaging more than 100 million online views per month. Using real-time reactions on social media to test characters and concepts, the most well-received characters are inducted into the "Crypt Monster Universe," who then form the basis for as many as 15 videos in a quarter. Giggles the Clown, The Look-See, and Sunny Family Cult are among the most popular series developed this way.

Crypt's viral characters expand beyond traditional narrative videos; Giggles the Clown does live streaming interviews with fans, engaging on social media as a typical influencer would, and she has appeared as an attraction at Knott's Scary Farm. Crypt also has a merchandising deal with Spencer's Gifts, which sells merchandise for Giggles, the Birch, and Sunny Family Cult.

=== The Birch ===
Produced by Crypt TV in 2016, The Birch is a short film about a sentient tree who protects a teenage boy from bullies, being summoned by the boy's bully breaking a talisman of the tree's. The short was written and directed by Anthony Melton and Ben Franklin, and the Birch creature design was created by special effects artist Cliff Wallace. The film went viral, winning a Webby award in 2017. The Birch was expanded and developed into a full-fledged Crypt Monster Universe character in its own Facebook Watch series, and in 2020 the show was renewed for a second ten-episode season that premiered in March 2021.

=== The Look-See ===
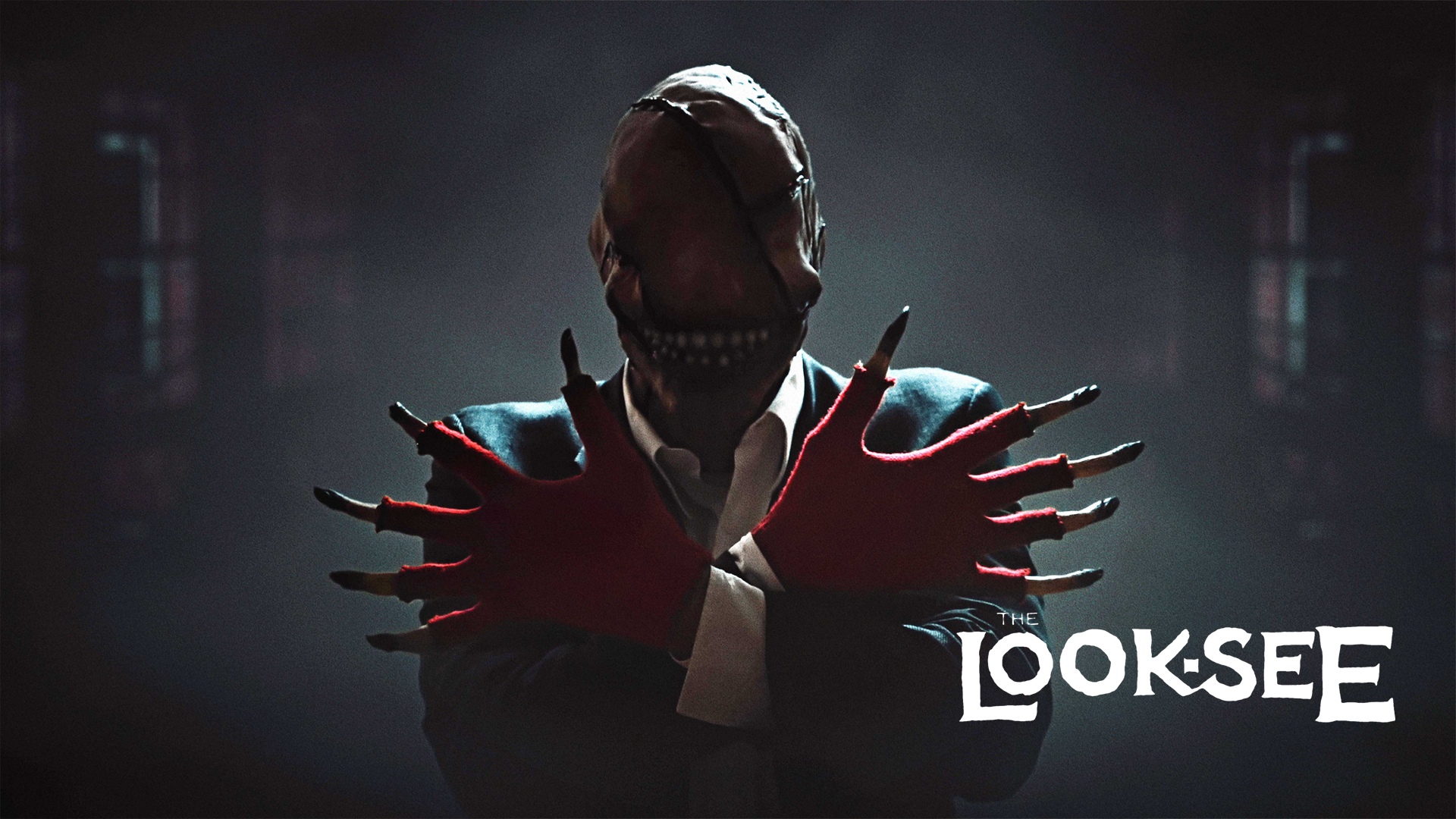
The Look-See

The Look-See is a horror web series based on a short by the same name. The series is about a sharp-toothed grinning demonic entity that puts his chosen victims to potentially fatal tests. Victims must to choose to let go of a specific item or person that they have held on to for a long time, and failure to release that specific item will end in the victim's death. The character and series were created by Landon Stahmer. The original short rose very quickly to popularity, and the titular monster is now one of Crypt TV's most recognizable monsters.

=== My First Day ===
Written and directed by Jon Kovel, My First Day is a darkly comedic horror short about a demented child who gets accepted into a private school for young aspiring serial killers. The short went viral and was shown at the 2017 Tribeca Film Festival as part of a horror anthology entitled Crypt TV's Monster Madness.

=== Sunny Family Cult ===
Sunny Family Cult is a horror drama web series based on a short film of the same name. The show centers around a teenage girl named Taylor, who strives for a normal life while juggling her not-so-normal serial-killing cult family. It featured actors such as Trew Mullen, Russell Cummings, and Stephanie Estes, and episodes were directed by Gabriel Younes and John William Ross. The series was eventually what was used to connect the Crypt Monster Universe together, with a mysterious book filled with monsters from the other popular Crypt Monster Universe series being revealed in the final season. The cult's symbol and mask paraphernalia has been seen in multiple films in the Crypt Monster Universe, and Taylor and the show's main antagonist Elias have appeared in Crypt Monster Universe films.

=== The Thing in the Apartment ===
The Thing in the Apartment is a popular horror short from 2015 about two women who must confront a creature lurking in the shadows of a flat. The short was written and directed by John Ross. In 2017 it was shown at the Tribeca Film Festival as part of Crypt TV's Monster Madness, and was featured as part of the Chiller Network's Slice of Summer. It spawned a sequel, The Thing in the Apartment: Part II, which was released on June 29, 2017.

=== The Door in the Woods ===
Produced and released by Crypt TV in October 2018, The Door in the Woods is a short film about a hidden colony in the woods that protects a door that leads to a dark dimension. Four children who are skeptical about the story of the door venture into the woods and open it, releasing a monstrous creature called "the Brute" that slaughters the entire town, leaving a little girl named Carrie as the sole survivor. The film was well received by viewers, and in 2020 a sequel starring Peyton List (Jessie, Cobra Kai) and Kal Penn (Designated Survivor) was released. Titled The Girl in the Woods, the sequel followed the events immediately after The Door in the Woods, with Carrie being found by a second survivor named Arthur Dean (portrayed by Penn), and eventually an adult Carrie (portrayed by List) sets out to kill the Brute.

In 2021, it was announced that an eight-episode eponymously titled series based on the two short films would be released by Crypt in partnership with the NBC streaming service Peacock, and was released exclusively on Peacock in October later that year. J. Casey Modderno was head writer, Krysten Ritter and Jacob Chase directed, and Stefanie Scott, Misha Osherovich, and Sofia Bryant starred as series regulars.

=== Miss Annity ===
Created by Look-See creator Landon Stahmer, Miss Annity is an anthology series about the titular spider monster, Miss Annity, picking off residents in an old apartment building. If her victim passes her test, Miss Annity kills them and makes them puppets in a show about outdated "life lessons", such as women needing to stay thin and men needing to be the providers of a household. Stahmer returned to both write and direct the three-episode series, and it aired on YouTube from October to November 2019. On November 9, 2019, it was announced via Crypt TV's Twitter that a second season of Miss Annity was in development.

== Selected filmography ==
Year	Title	Project type	Distributor
2015	This Forgotten Day in Fright	Short film	Facebook, YouTube
2015	The Thing in the Apartment	Digital series	Hearst Digital Studios
2016	My First Day	Short film	Facebook, YouTube
2016	Slice of Summer	Short film series	Chiller Network
2016	The Birch	Short film	Facebook, YouTube
2017	Crypt Fables	Digital series	Facebook, YouTube
2017	Hospice	Short film series	Facebook, YouTube
2017	Stereoscope	Short film	Facebook, YouTube
2017	Mordeo	Short film	Facebook, YouTube
2017	Morgu	Short film	Facebook, YouTube
2017	Sunny Family Cult	Short film; digital series	Facebook, YouTube
2017	The Look-See	Short film	Facebook, YouTube
2017	Cakeman	Short film series	Facebook, YouTube
2017	Ghosted	Digital series	Verizon's go90
2017	The Chosen	Short film	Facebook, YouTube
2017	Stoneheart	Web series	Facebook, YouTube
2017	Afterlife	Digital series	Fullscreen
2017	The Look-See Part II	Short film	Facebook, YouTube
2017	The Look-See Part III	Short film series	Facebook, YouTube
	Troubled Youth	Short film	Facebook, YouTube
2018	The Door in the Woods	Short film	YouTube
2018	Friendship Bracelet and Keep Out	Digital series	Netflix
2019	The Birch	Web television series	Facebook Watch
2019	Miss Annity	Web series	YouTube
2020	The Girl in the Woods	Short film	YouTube
2020	Steroscope	Web television series	Facebook Watch
2020	Kinderfänger	Web television series	Facebook Watch
2021	Mira Mira	Web television series	Facebook Watch
2021	Woman in the Book	Web television series	Facebook Watch
2021	The Girl in the Woods	Web television series	Peacock
2021	Chhorii	Hindi film	Amazon Prime Video
2022	Haunted House: Trick-VR-Treat	Virtual reality experience	Meta's Horizon Worlds, Meta Quest TV
