= Vita & Virginia =

2018 film by Chanya Button

- Theatrical release poster
- Directed by: Chanya Button
- Written by: Eileen Atkins; Chanya Button
- Based on: Vita & Virginia by Eileen Atkins
- Produced by: Evangelo Kioussis; Katie Holly; Shashank Shambharkar
- Starring: Gemma Arterton; Elizabeth Debicki; Rupert Penry-Jones; Peter Ferdinando; Gethin Anthony; Emerald Fennell; Adam Gillen; Karla Crome; Rory Fleck Byrne; Nathan Stewart-Jarrett; Isabella Rossellini
- Cinematography: Carlos De Carvalho
- Edited by: Mark Trend
- Music by: Isobel Waller-Bridge
- Production companies: Bl!nder Films; Mirror Productions; Protagonist Pictures; Mehra Entertainment; LipSync Productions; Rather Good Films Ltd; Screen Ireland
- Distributed by: Thunderbird Releasing
- Release dates: 11 September 2018 (TIFF); 5 July 2019 (United Kingdom and Ireland)
- Running time: 110 minutes
- Countries: United Kingdom; Ireland
- Language: English
- Box office: $789,095

Vita & Virginia is a 2018 biographical romantic drama film directed by Chanya Button. The screenplay, written by Button and Eileen Atkins, is adapted from the 1992 play Vita & Virginia by Atkins. The film stars Gemma Arterton, Elizabeth Debicki, and Isabella Rossellini. Set in the 1920s, Vita & Virginia tells the story of the love affair between Vita Sackville-West and Virginia Woolf.

The film had its world premiere as a Special Presentation at the Toronto International Film Festival on 11 September 2018. It was released in the United Kingdom on 5 July 2019, and in the United States on 23 August 2019.

== Plot ==
Set in the 1920s, the writers Vita Sackville-West and Virginia Woolf move in different London circles. When they meet, Vita decides Virginia will be her next conquest. They have an affair against the background of each of their open marriages.

== Cast ==
- Gemma Arterton as Vita Sackville-West
- Elizabeth Debicki as Virginia Woolf
- Isabella Rossellini as Lady Sackville
- Rupert Penry-Jones as Harold Nicolson
- Peter Ferdinando as Leonard Woolf
- Gethin Anthony as Clive Bell
- Emerald Fennell as Vanessa Bell
- Adam Gillen as Duncan Grant
- Karla Crome as Dorothy Wellesley
- Rory Fleck Byrne as Geoffrey Scott
- Nathan Stewart-Jarrett as Ralph Partridge

== Production ==
On 30 June 2016, Deadline Hollywood reported that British director Chanya Button (Note: Sacha Polak had come on board as director in 2014 but withdrew from the project soon after.) was to direct Vita and Virginia from a script by Eileen Atkins, with Evangelo Kioussis of Mirror Productions and Katie Holly of Bl!nder Films as producers. The screenplay is based on Atkins' stage play Vita & Virginia. Gemma Arterton, who also became an executive producer of the film, had received the first draft from Atkins years before and showed it to Button; and Button subsequently co-wrote the final script with Atkins.

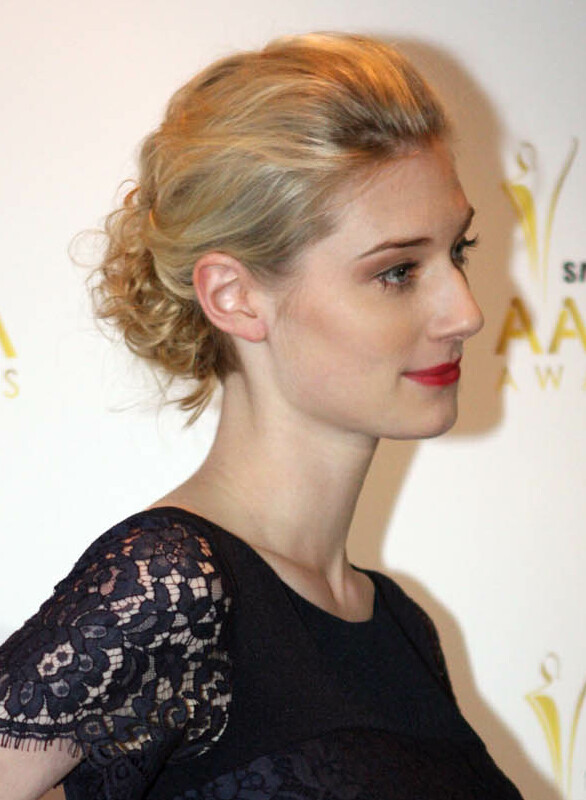
Elizabeth Debicki in 2012

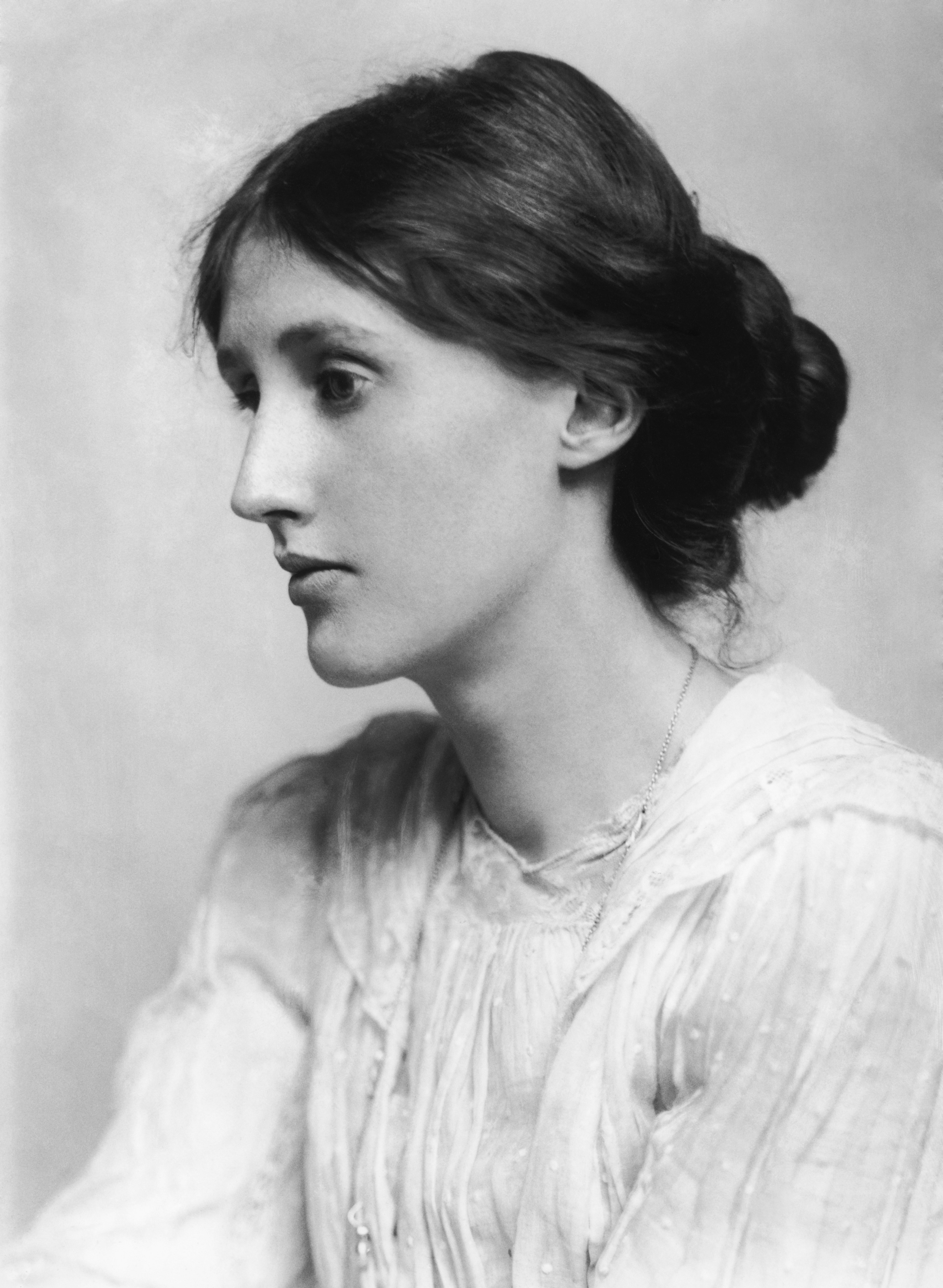
Virginia Woolf in 1902

On 8 February 2017, it was announced that Eva Green and Gemma Arterton had been cast in the film. (Note: Romola Garai was originally cast in the role of Virginia Woolf.) In May 2017, it was reported that Green had left the project due to scheduling conflicts. Green was replaced by Andrea Riseborough. Elizabeth Debicki was eventually cast in the role of Woolf in August 2017, with Isabella Rossellini also joining the production.

Financing was procured from the Irish Film Board, Piccadilly Pictures, Sampsonic Media, and Lipsync Productions; with Protagonist Pictures handling international sales. Principal photography began in September 2017 in Dublin, Ireland.

In August 2017, Thunderbird Releasing acquired the distribution rights for the United Kingdom. Distribution rights for Germany were acquired by NFP, Australia and New Zealand by Transmission Films, Czech Republic and Slovakia by CinemArt, Greece by Seven Films, Hong Kong by EDKO, Israel by Forum Film, Poland by M2 Films, Portugal by Lusumundo, and in the former Yugoslavia by MCF.

The first film still was released by Protagonist Pictures on 1 November 2017.

== Release ==
The world premiere was held at the Toronto International Film Festival on 11 September 2018. It was selected as the opening night film of the 2019 Frameline Film Festival in San Francisco and the 2019 BFI Flare in London.

Vita and Virginia was released theatrically in the United Kingdom and Ireland on 5 July 2019 by Thunderbird Releasing. It was released in the United States on 23 August 2019 by IFC Films.

=== Home media ===
The film was released on video on demand (VOD) in the US on 30 August 2019.

== Reception ==
=== Critical reception ===
Review aggregator Rotten Tomatoes gives the film a 41% approval rating based on 92 reviews, with an average rating of 5.6/10. The website's critics consensus reads: "Vita & Virginia takes a well-acted and initially intriguing look at the relationship between its real-life protagonists, but is undone by unsatisfying storytelling." According to Metacritic, which sampled the opinions of 18 critics and calculated a score of 43 out of 100, the film received "mixed or average reviews".

=== Accolades ===
Elizabeth Debicki's portrayal of Virginia Woolf was recognised with a nomination for Best Supporting Actress at the 22nd British Independent Film Awards. The film was also nominated for Best Makeup & Hair at the 16th Irish Film & Television Awards.
