= The Girl in the Woods =

2021 television series

- Genre: Supernatural horror; Thriller
- Country of origin: United States
- Original language: English
- No. of seasons: 1
- No. of episodes: 8

Production
- Executive producers: Jack Davis; Darren Brandl
- Production company: Crypt TV

Original release
- Network: Peacock
- Release: October 21, 2021

The Girl in the Woods is an American horror television series produced by Crypt TV, which premiered on Peacock on October 21, 2021. It follows the story of a secret door protected by a cult, whose children suffer the aftermath after deciding to open it. The show stars Stefanie Scott, Misha Osherovich, and Sofia Bryant.

The series was produced following the success of two similarly-titled short films, which it is loosely based on. The Girl in the Woods earned positive reviews from critics, who praised the scares and the performance of Scott, however some found its plot to be formulaic.

== Cast ==
=== Main ===
- Stefanie Scott as Carrie
- Misha Osherovich as Nolan
- Sofia Bryant as Tasha

=== Recurring ===
- Will Yun Lee as Arthur Dean
- Kylie Liya Page as Sara
- Reed Diamond as Hosea
- Leonard Roberts as Alex

== Episodes ==
No.	Title	Directed by	Teleplay by	Original release date
1	"The Guardian"	Krysten Ritter	Jane Casey Modderno	October 21, 2021
When a mysterious teen arrives, a disappearance strikes fear into the heart of West Pine.
2	"The Door in the Woods"	Krysten Ritter	Jane Casey Modderno	October 21, 2021
The demon hunts for more prey as Carrie's past threatens to shatter her new friend's trust in her.
3	"The Lure"	Krysten Ritter	Jane Casey Modderno	October 21, 2021
As Carrie confronts her past, the three teens risk their lives to try to stop the Hypnotist.
4	"Cracks"	Krysten Ritter	Jane Casey Modderno	October 21, 2021
The teen's investigation and horrifying discovery lead to drunken, music filled mayhem in the woods.
5	"One Door Closes"	Jacob Chase	Felicia Ho	October 21, 2021
When the trio splits up, each teen comes face to face with a new horror.
6	"Vast Gehenna"	Jacob Chase	Jane Casey Modderno	October 21, 2021
Carrie faces off against the girl she once betrayed. Tasha fights for her life against the Echo.
7	"Weapon Against the Shadow"	Jacob Chase	Jane Casey Modderno	October 21, 2021
Carrie and Tasha fight to save their loved ones from the corrupting influence of Gehenna.
8	"Angel of the Dawn"	Jacob Chase	Jane Casey Modderno	October 21, 2021
With the town's fate on their shoulders, Carrie and Tasha must close the tear before it's too late.

== Production ==
=== Background ===
==== Preceding short films ====
The Brute is a powerful creature that passes through a tear between dimensions. It is tall and sinewy, with slimy, peach skin, eyes veiled by flesh and massive, sharp teeth. It effortlessly decapitates its victims before devouring the flesh off of their bones. It carries a brand on its head, the same symbol worn on the clothing of the cult members.

The Door in the Woods premiered on YouTube in 2019. In The Door in the Woods, the children of a rural cult decide to open a locked door that their families have sworn to protect. Opening the door unleashes The Brute, a terrifying, supernatural creature. The monster devours Ben, the boy who opened the door, and quickly goes on a rampage through the compound, picking off cult members one-by-one. Carrie, the last child alive in the cult, manages to close the door, but not before losing both parents and her left arm. The Door in the Woods was directed by Joey Greene. Mark Villalobos was in charge of creature design and makeup special effects.

On October 18, 2019, Crypt TV announced a sequel to The Door in the Woods, to be called The Girl in the Woods. In the sequel, AD (Kal Penn) rescues Carrie, the titular girl in the woods, who helped unleash The Brute. Seven years later, adult Carrie (Peyton List) thinks back on life with AD and the fateful day the Brute got loose. AD trains Carrie to defend herself against The Brute and reminds her never to open the Door. When she's ready, he gives her a new arm that he has constructed out of metal, with a special blade made of material mined from the ground near the Door. With this blade, Carrie can defend herself against any of the creatures that come from the “wound” behind the door, including The Brute. The Girl in the Woods was written by David Calbert and Van Nguyen, and directed by Roxine Helberg.

=== Development ===
On Thursday, April 29, 2021, Crypt TV announced that The Girl in the Woods was picked up as an eight-episode series on NBC’s streaming network Peacock, to premiere in October 2021. The series had a different cast from the movies. Krysten Ritter (Jessica Jones) directed the first four episodes, including the pilot, with Jacob Chase (Come Play) directing the other four episodes. Jane Casey Modderno (The Birch) was named head writer.

=== Casting ===
On May 10, 2021 Peacock announced the cast with Stefanie Scott in the lead role, Misha Osherovich and Sofia Bryant as series regulars and Will Yun Lee, Kylie Liya Page, Reed Diamond and Leonard Roberts in recurring roles.

== Reception ==
The series has a 71% fresh rating on website Rotten Tomatoes based on seven reviews with an average score of 5.7/10.
