= Burn Burn Burn =

- UK theatrical poster
- Directed by: Chanya Button
- Written by: Charlie Covell
- Produced by: Chanya Button; Daniel-Konrad Cooper; Tim Phillips
- Starring: Laura Carmichael; Chloe Pirrie; Jack Farthing; Joe Dempsie; Sally Phillips
- Music by: Marc Canham; Candy Says
- Production company: Rather Good Films Ltd
- Distributed by: Urban Distribution (France; theatrical); Vendetta Films (Australia; DVD)
- Release date: 15 October 2015 (London Film Festival)
- Running time: 106 minutes
- Country: United Kingdom
- Language: English

Burn Burn Burn is a 2015 British black comedy film, the directorial debut of Chanya Button. The film is a coming-of-age tale, written by Charlie Covell and inspired by the Jack Kerouac novel On the Road published in 1957. The film had its world premiere at the BFI London Film Festival 2015.

== Plot ==
The plot follows the story of two women, Seph (Laura Carmichael) and Alex (Chloe Pirrie), taking a road trip to follow the instructions of their close friend Dan, who has died and given them instructions where to scatter his ashes. The ashes (stored in tupperware in the glove compartment) keep diminishing in quantity as the trip progresses.

== Cast ==
- Laura Carmichael as Seph
- Chloe Pirrie as Alex
- Jack Farthing as Dan
- Joe Dempsie as James
- Alison Steadman as Diana
- Alice Lowe as Davina
- Julian Rhind-Tutt as Adam
- Sally Phillips as Ingrid
- Nigel Planer as Henry
- Jane Asher as Amelia
- Matthew Kelly as Doug
- Melanie Walters as Shelle
- Hannah Arterton as Sophie
- Susan Wokoma as Megan

== Reception ==
Writing in The Guardian, Peter Bradshaw described the film as "a sort of millennials mashup of Laughter in Paradise and Last Orders." Bradshaw notes that, "It's not the most original premise, but it's very nicely acted by Carmichael and Pirrie (who was the lead in Scott Graham’s 2012 movie Shell). There are some great cameos from Julian Rhind-Tutt and Alison Steadman, and some startling moments, such as the surreal scene in which Alex has to play the crucified Christ in an am-dram production of the Passion, and makes a personal confession from the cross".

The Guardian critic, Wendy Ide added, "The approach is a blend of comedy of discomfort – a brilliant cameo by Julian Rhind-Tutt is mortifyingly funny – and sober reflection on lives that have reached a turning point. It's not wholly original, but Burn Burn Burn is nicely acted and emotionally authentic. Button shows real promise as a director".

On Rotten Tomatoes, the film has an approval rating of 92% based on reviews from 12 critics.

== Awards ==
The film won the Grand Prix at Odesa International Film Festival in Ukraine in 2016.
