= Lee Gilbert =

British Author, Speaker, Business Consultant, Chief Marketing Officer (born 1977)

- Born: 24 August 1977 (age 49); Peterborough, UK
- Education: Stanground College, Peterborough (until 1995)
- Occupations: Author (Non - Fiction), Speaker, Business Consultant, Chief Marketing Officer
- Years active: 1995 - Present
- Notable work: Turning Monkeys Into Lemons, The Secrets of the Serious Players' Webmaster
- Website: leegilbert.com

Lee Gilbert is a British author, Speaker, Chief Marketing Officer based in Peterborough.

== Career ==
Gilbert worked from 1995 to 2000 for Pearl Assurance in Peterborough in notable roles in Human Resources and IT. During her time at Pearl she qualified in HR as a CIPD and acquired multiple Sales Training and Management Training certifications and awards.

In 2001, she formed her own company acting as a Digital Marketing Consultant and Speaker under which she worked as an interim consultant in multiple organisations and startups and been a regular speaker at Business conferences in UK, Europe and the Middle East.

She is currently Chief Marketing Officer for Nourish Care.

== Books ==
Lee Gilbert has been credited with two published books, namely:

- Turning Monkeys Into Lemons
- The Secrets of the Serious Players' Webmaster
