= Stephen Warbeck =

English composer (born 1953)

- Born: 21 October 1953 (age 73); Southampton, Hampshire England, U.K.
- Genres: classical music, film music
- Occupation: composer
- Website: unitedagents.co.uk/stephen-warbeck

Stephen Warbeck (born 21 October 1953) is an English composer, best known for his film and television scores.

Warbeck was born in Southampton, Hampshire. He first became known for the music for Prime Suspect and won an Oscar for his score for Shakespeare in Love. He won the Drama Desk Award for Outstanding Music in a Play in 1994.

Warbeck attended Bristol University, and began his career as an actor. He plays the accordion and co-leads the group The hKippers (the 'h' is silent) with Paul Bradley.

In 2018, he directed his first feature film, The Thin Man, which was retitled The Man in the Hat in France, starring Ciarán Hinds and Stephen Dillane.

== Film scores ==
- Mrs Brown (1997)
- Shakespeare in Love (1998) (Academy Award)
- The Duke (1998)
- Mystery Men (1999)
- A Christmas Carol (1999)
- Billy Elliot (2000)
- Quills (2000)
- Captain Corelli's Mandolin (2001)
- Charlotte Gray (2001)
- Deseo (2002)
- The Alzheimer Case (2003)
- Love's Brother (2004)
- Two Brothers (2004)
- Oyster Farmer (2004)
- Proof (2005)
- Cargo (2006)
- Alpha Male (2006)
- Goal II: Living the Dream (2007)
- Flawless (2007)
- Miguel y William (2007)
- The Other Man (2008)
- He Who Said No (2008)
- The Hessen Affair (2009)
- The Winter Butterfly (2010)
- Princess Kaiulani (2010)
- Un balcon sur la mer (2010)
- There Be Dragons (2011)
- Polisse (2011)
- A Young Doctor's Notebook (2012)
- Des gens qui s'embrassent (2013)
- Hussein Who Said No (2014)
- Arctic Heart (2016)
- Hampstead (2017)
- The Children Act (2017)
- Making Noise Quietly (2019)
- My Family and the Wolf (2019)
- The Man in the Hat (2020)
- DNA (2020)
- Jeanne du Barry (2023)
- The Last Rifleman (2023)
- The One Note Man (2023)

== Awards and nominations ==
=== Academy Awards ===
Academy Award for Original Music Score-Best Original Musical or Comedy Score

- Won: Shakespeare in Love (1998)

=== BAFTA Awards ===
BAFTA Award for Best Film Music-Anthony Asquith Award for Film Music

- Nominated: Billy Elliot (2001)
- Nominated: Shakespeare in Love (1999)

BAFTA TV Award for Best Original Television Music

- Nominated: Screen Two (TV)-For episode "Skallagrigg (#10.2) (1995)
- Nominated: Prime Suspect (TV) (1992)

=== BMI Film & TV Awards ===
BMI Film Music Award

- Won: Shakespeare in Love (1999)

=== Cannes International Film Festival Awards ===
Jury Prize for Feature Films

- Won: Polisse, directed by Maïwenn Le Besco, score by Stephen Warbeck (2011)

=== European Film Awards ===
Best Composer Award

- Nominated: De zaak Alzheimer (2004)

=== Ghent International Film Festival Awards ===
INTERNATIONAL COMPETITION 'THE IMPACT OF MUSIC ON FILM'-Georges Delerue Award for Best Music

- Won: Proof (2005)

=== Grammy Awards ===
Best Instrumental Composition Written for a Motion Picture, Television or Other Visual Media

- Nominated: Shakespeare in Love (1998)

=== Other ===
- Crystal Simorgh for The Day of Judgement (2008 film)
