= Charlie Covell =

British writer and actor

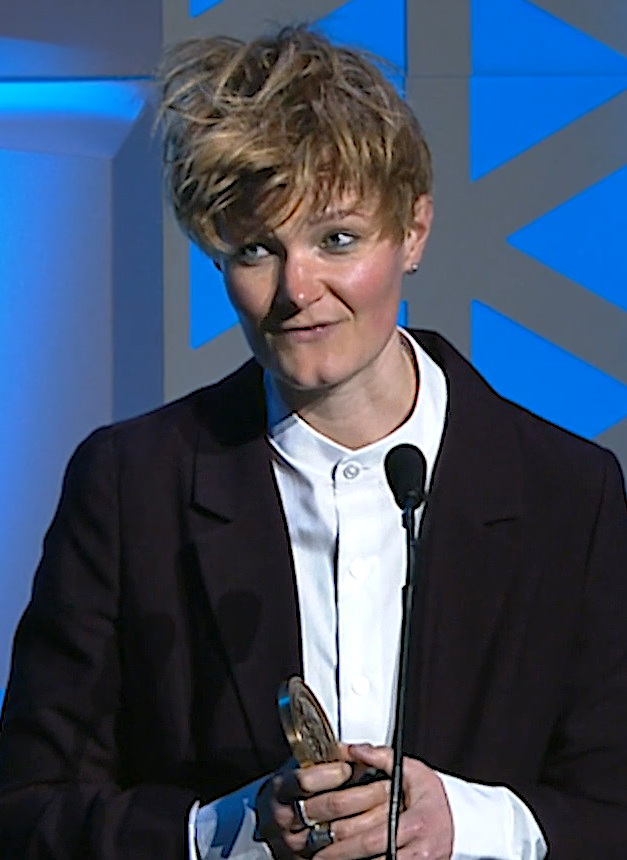
- Covell at the Peabody Awards 2019
- Born: 1983 or 1984 (age 42–43); Blackheath, London, England
- Occupations: Writer, actor, producer

Charlie Covell is a British writer, showrunner and actor, best known for their adaptation of the graphic comic series The End of the F***ing World for Channel 4 and the show Kaos on Netflix. They are set to serve as showrunner and executive producer for the upcoming television adaptation of Life Is Strange for Amazon Prime Video.

== Biography ==
Covell, who uses they/them pronouns, was born in Blackheath and studied English at Oxford University.

== Career ==
Covell's acting screen debut was in 2003 in the television series Fortysomething alongside Hugh Laurie, Anna Chancellor, and Benedict Cumberbatch. Covell has appeared in Midsomer Murders (2008), Law & Order: UK (2009), The Inbetweeners (2010) as Sophie, Whitechapel (2011), Peep Show (2012).

As a screenwriter, Covell wrote Banana, Burn Burn Burn (2015), and then the Channel 4 series The End of the F***ing World.

In 2015, Covell was named as an Screen International Star of Tomorrow.

In 2024, Covell created Kaos (2024) for the streaming service Netflix. It was cancelled after one season.

In 2025, it was announced that Covell would serve as showrunner and executive producer on a television adaptation of Life Is Strange for Amazon Prime Video.

In April 2026, Deadline announced that Covell will be adapting the So Gay For You book by The L Word's producers, Kate Moennig and Leisha Hailey.

== Filmography ==
=== Acting ===
Year	Title	Role	Notes
2003	Fortysomething	Woj	3 episodes
2005	Messiah: The Harrowing	Sara Knightley	3 episodes
2007	Doctors	Anna Metcalf	Episode: "Force of Habit"
2007	Angelo's	Andrea	3 episodes
2008	Midsomer Murders	Kate Hammond	Episode: "Shot at Dawn"
2009	Law & Order: UK	Louise Ackroyd	Episode: "Unsafe"
2009	Oscar & Jim	Emma	Short film
2009	Breathe: Act One	Thea	Short film
2010	Forget Me Not	Carly	
2010	The Inbetweeners	Sophie	Episode: "Trip To Warwick"
2010	Whitechapel	Blond Boy	2 episodes
2011	Frog/Robot	Girl	Short film
2012	A Fantastic Fear of Everything	Holby	
2012	Peep Show	Trish	3 episodes
2012	Misfits	James	Episode: "Episode #4.7"
2015	Banana	Amy	Episode: "Episode #1.6"
2015	Cucumber	Amy	2 episodes
2016	Siblings	Jenny	Episode: "Kevin Rugby"
2016	Marcella	DC Alex Dier	8 episodes

=== Writer ===
Year	Title	Notes
2015	Banana	2 episodes
2015	Burn Burn Burn	
2017–2019	The End of the F***ing World	16 episodes
2024	Truelove	6 episodes, co-created by credit with Iain Weatherby
2024	Kaos	8 episodes
TBA	Life Is Strange †	6 episodes, creator
