= The End of the F***ing World =

2017 British comedy-drama television series

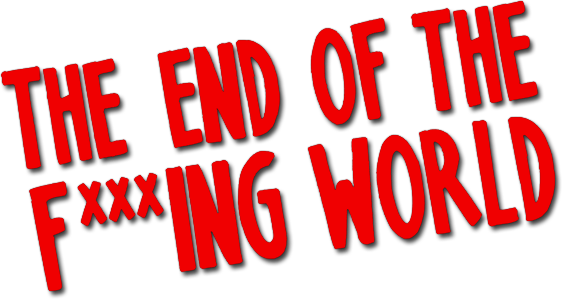
- Genre: Black comedy; Tragicomedy
- Created by: Jonathan Entwistle
- Based on: The End of the Fucking World by Charles Forsman
- Written by: Charlie Covell
- Directed by: Jonathan Entwistle; Lucy Tcherniak; Lucy Forbes; Destiny Ekaragha
- Starring: Alex Lawther; Jessica Barden; Naomi Ackie
- Composer: Graham Coxon
- Country of origin: United Kingdom
- Original language: English
- No. of series: 2
- No. of episodes: 16

Production
- Executive producers: Ed Macdonald; Murray Ferguson; Andy Baker; Petra Fried; Dominic Buchanan; Jonathan Entwistle
- Producer: Kate Ogborn
- Cinematography: Justin Brown; Ben Fordesman
- Running time: 19–24 minutes
- Production companies: Clerkenwell Films; Dominic Buchanan Productions

Original release
- Network: Channel 4
- Release: 24 October 2017 – 4 November 2019

The End of the F***ing World is a British black comedy television programme. Based on the 2011–13 minicomics The End of the Fucking World by Charles Forsman, the eight-part first series premiered its first episode on Channel 4 in the United Kingdom on 24 October 2017. Later episodes were released on All 4. Netflix handled international distribution and released it internationally on 5 January 2018. The programme follows James (Alex Lawther), a 17-year-old who believes himself to be a psychopath, and Alyssa Foley (Jessica Barden), an angry classmate who sees in James a chance to escape her tumultuous home life. Gemma Whelan, Wunmi Mosaku, Steve Oram, Christine Bottomley, Navin Chowdhry, Barry Ward and Naomi Ackie appear in supporting roles.

Series creator Jonathan Entwistle contacted Forsman about making a film, and a short one was made in 2014. The short film is now considered lost, with no way to access it online. Instead, an eight-part serial was commissioned, and filming began in April 2017. It was written by Charlie Covell and episodes were directed by Entwistle and Lucy Tcherniak. In August 2018, the programme was renewed for a second series, which premiered on Channel 4 on 4 November 2019, after which all eight episodes were released on All 4, and internationally on Netflix the next day. Before the second series's release, Covell said a third series was not planned.

The programme has been praised for its writing, execution and subject matter, as well as for Lawther's and Barden's performances. Both series were nominated for the British Academy Television Award for Best Drama Series, with the second series winning in 2020 and receiving a Peabody Award in 2019.

== Premise ==
James is a 17-year-old who believes he is a psychopath. He kills animals as a hobby, but grows bored with that and decides to try killing a person. He settles on Alyssa, a mouthy, rebellious classmate with issues of her own. She proposes that they run away together, hoping for an adventure away from her turbulent home life, and James agrees with the intention of finding an opportunity to kill her. They embark on a road trip across England and develop a relationship after a series of mishaps.

== Cast and characters ==
=== Main ===
- Alex Lawther as James, a disturbed 17-year-old who believes he is a psychopath; Alyssa's love interest
  - Jack Veal as young James
- Jessica Barden as Alyssa, a rebellious teenage girl; James's intended victim
  - Holly Beechey as young Alyssa
- Naomi Ackie as Bonnie, a young woman who sets out on a journey to avenge her lover's death (series 2)

=== Recurring ===
- Gemma Whelan as Eunice Noon, a detective constable and Darego's partner (series 1)
- Wunmi Mosaku as Teri Darego, a detective constable and Noon's stern partner (series 1)
- Steve Oram as Phil, James's father
- Christine Bottomley as Gwen, Alyssa's mother
- Navin Chowdhry as Tony, Alyssa's stepfather (series 1)
- Jonathan Aris as Clive Koch, an author, professor, serial killer and rapist
- Barry Ward as Leslie Foley, Alyssa's father (series 1)

=== Guest ===
- Geoff Bell as Martin, a family man who gives Alyssa and James a ride (series 1)
- Alex Sawyer as Topher, a young man Alyssa meets with whom she tries to have sex (series 1)
- Eileen Davies as Flora, Clive's mother (series 1)
- Leon Annor as Emil, a store security guard by whom Alyssa is caught (series 1)
- Earl Cave as Frodo, a petrol station employee (series 1)
- Felicity Montagu as Jocelyn, the petrol station manager (series 1)
- Alex Beckett as Jonno, one of Leslie's buyers (series 1)
- Kierston Wareing as Debbie, Leslie's ex-girlfriend with whom he has a child (series 1)
- Matt King as Eddie Onslow, a detective constable (series 1)
- Kelly Harrison as James's dead mother (series 1)
- Zerina Imsirovic as Alyssa's baby sister (series 1)
- Josh Dylan as Todd, Alyssa's husband (series 2)
- Alexandria Riley as Leigh, Gwen's sister (series 2)
- Florence Bell as Iggy (series 2)
- Tim Key as Gus, a motel owner (series 2)
- Paterson Joseph as Kevan, a chemist (series 2)
- Divian Ladwa as Sid, a police officer (series 2)
- Lynn Hunter as Jerry (series 2)

== Episodes ==
Series	Episodes	Originally released (UK)
1	8	24 October 2017
2	8	4 November 2019

=== Series 1 (2017) ===
No. overall	Episode	Directed by	Written by	Original release date
1	Episode 1	Jonathan Entwistle	Charlie Covell	24 October 2017 (Note: The first episode had a special premiere on Channel 4 alongside its release on All 4 with the rest of the programme.)
James is a 17-year-old who believes he is a psychopath, having once burned his hand in a deep fryer to feel something and has been killing animals since he was 15. At school, he encounters Alyssa, a rebellious new schoolmate and decides that he will kill her next. As she takes an interest in him, he feigns romantic interest and the two start dating. When Alyssa asks James to perform cunnilingus on her the next day, he begins preparing his knife and working out how he will kill her. She is late after being stuck at her home garden party where her stepfather tells her it would be better if she left. After that, she visits James and blurts out her desire to leave town with or without him and asks if he is in, wanting him to say yes. Resolving that he could kill her later, he accepts. He punches his father Phil in the face and steals his Mercedes-Benz, something he had always wanted to do.
2	Episode 2	Jonathan Entwistle	Charlie Covell	24 October 2017
With their newfound freedom, Alyssa and James play laser tag but end up having to dine and dash at a restaurant after realising they have spent all their money. Alyssa suggests they attempt to have sex while driving, but while getting undressed they swerve off the road and crash into a tree. They hitchhike in the van of Martin, a middle-aged man whom Alyssa quickly dislikes. While in the toilets of the restaurant they have stopped at for food, Martin follows James and asks about his burnt hand, before smelling it and putting it on his crotch; James is submissive, despite being disgusted by it. Alyssa sees this and blackmails Martin into giving her his wallet. After booking a hotel room, Alyssa goes to the bathroom and cries, while James waits with his knife by the door, hesitantly. He softens when he hears her crying and puts his knife away; Alyssa calls home and her stepfather Tony answers. He denies her request to speak to her mother, Gwen, implying his dominance over her mother. Alyssa asks James whether he wants her or just goes along with her; he replies that he wants her. She decides to go see her father, Leslie, whom she has not seen since she was 8 years old; James agrees to join her.
3	Episode 3	Jonathan Entwistle	Charlie Covell	24 October 2017
After leaving the hotel, Alyssa argues against buying train tickets to her father's house, internally fearing that he will not recognize or welcome her. The duo break into the spacious and empty house of author Clive Koch. Later that day, Alyssa attempts to give James a blowjob but leaves angrily, when a picture of Koch puts him off. During her walk, Alyssa meets Topher and brings him to the house, vindictively announcing to James that she will have sex with Topher. Distraught, he looks around the house and finds Polaroids and a camcorder with footage of victims, revealing Koch to be a serial rapist. Alyssa loses interest in Topher and stops before intercourse; Topher leaves angrily. While Alyssa is asleep, James tries to kill her but he cannot because he realizes he is falling in love with her, and not wanting to disturb her, lies on the floor next to her. Koch returns home and suspecting a break-in, arms himself with a poker; James slides under the bed. When Koch finds Alyssa in his bed, he questions her. She is terrified and out of fear, she lies and says that she is alone. Koch becomes malevolent, attempting to rape her. James stabs him in the neck with a knife, killing him and saving Alyssa. James and Alyssa tell each other that they are virgins.
4	Episode 4	Jonathan Entwistle	Charlie Covell	24 October 2017
After failing to move Koch's body out of the bedroom, James and Alyssa meticulously clean the house to remove evidence of their stay. James shows Alyssa the Polaroids and footage proving that Koch might have hurt her and they resolve to leave the evidence by his body. James hides the knife in the pool drain. When she questions why he had a knife, he does not answer. Koch's mother, Flora, arrives at the house and discovers his body; she destroys the Polaroids but not the footage. The police, led by detective constables Eunice Noon and Teri Darego, investigate and discover Topher's wallet in the bedroom. While questioning him, he reveals Alyssa's and James's identities and their squatting in the house. They decide to put out a request for sightings or crimes "involving two teenagers" while putting Alyssa and James on the missing persons list. Despite James's attempts, Alyssa becomes distrustful of him and deserts him while he waits in a café. He begins to realise the increasing influence of his emotions, and pays three teenage boys to beat him up, hoping to feel something. He also realises his growing attraction to Alyssa and stops plotting to murder her. He decides to report a murder to the police, coming to the realisation that he is not a psychopath.
5	Episode 5	Jonathan Entwistle & Lucy Tcherniak	Charlie Covell	24 October 2017
At the police station, James changes his mind about reporting Koch's murder and instead describes his mother's suicide as the "murder" he was referring to. In a flashback, his mother, Vanessa, killed herself in front of him eleven years ago by driving her car into a pond. Thinking of Alyssa, James flees the police station and returns to the café. Phil is questioned by Noon and Darego about James, as well as informed him about his car. He also confirms the inclusion of Alyssa. They question Tony - who does not care about Alyssa - before asking Gwen about Alyssa, telling Gwen that they are investigating a murder. Alyssa is caught by Emil, a security guard - while attempting to shoplift clean underwear - but he releases her minutes later. She returns to the café to find James. Although they have no money left, they reconcile and decide to find Leslie. Investigators find James's knife at Koch's house.
6	Episode 6	Lucy Tcherniak	Charlie Covell	24 October 2017
James hotwires a car and the duo begin making their way to Alyssa's father's house. They stop at a petrol station after running low on fuel. When Jocelyn, the petrol station manager, begins suspecting that they stole the car and have no money, James fakes carrying a gun to lock her in the toilet with the help of Jocelyn's co-worker, Frodo. When he wants to join, they wait until he is distracted to dash off. Noon and Darego question Flora again about Clive, this time with years-old accusations of sexual assault against him. She rejects the allegations as lies and insists that the two leave. On their way to Leslie's, Alyssa calls Gwen and tells her that she will never return home. At the police station, Flora gives Noon the camcorder, having had a change of heart. When Noon raises the possibility that the killing was in self-defence, Darego says that this would result in a count of manslaughter instead. Upon reaching Leslie's home, his ex-girlfriend Debbie says he has moved into a mobile home on the coast, and James and Alyssa eventually make their way to it.
7	Episode 7	Lucy Tcherniak	Charlie Covell	24 October 2017
James and Alyssa get on well with Leslie. However, when Leslie is revealed to be a drug dealer, James disagrees with Alyssa's plan to stay at Leslie's. Tony, Gwen and Phil are emotionally shaken after the police show them CCTV footage of the petrol station robbery. Darego and Noon plan for the police to stake out Leslie's former residence, assuming that both have not arrived. On the drive to Leslie's former residence, it becomes clear that Darego's law-abiding morality and stubbornness are clashing against Noon's open-minded and sympathetic morals. As Alyssa and Leslie reconnect at a nearby bar, James begins feeling distant to Alyssa. At Leslie's former residence, Debbie denies seeing the duo or knowing Leslie's whereabouts to Noon and Darego. She goes to the bar to demand support for their son, Milton. When Alyssa questions why he never mentioned he has a son, Leslie takes off in his truck, critically running over a small dog in the process. Although he has killed many animals before, James is unable to kill the dog with a rock and Alyssa does it instead, to end its suffering. Bitter, Debbie reveals to Noon Leslie's location and she drives there without Darego. Leslie is shocked to see a news report about Alyssa and James on the television, including an offer of reward.
8	Episode 8	Lucy Tcherniak	Charlie Covell	24 October 2017
James and Alyssa bury the dog at the beach, wrapped in Leslie's old jacket, then passionately and sincerely make out. At dawn, ruminating about their current situation, they decide to take the boat owned by Leslie and leave the country. When they ask Leslie for the boat keys, he reveals to them his knowledge of their crime then secretly calls 999 and tries to induce their confession. James deduces this and confesses while taking the blame upon himself. Noon, listening in, arrives at the scene and tries to convince both to be willingly arrested for manslaughter while Leslie tries to convince Alyssa to let James be arrested instead. Alyssa asks Noon if she were to go with her idea, would James and herself be in the same institute. When Noon tells that that would be unlikely, Alyssa knocks her out with Leslie's shotgun, takes his boat keys and runs to the boat with James, only to find that the tide has gone out. With the armed police closing in, James knocks Alyssa down with the gun to take all the blame and runs across the beach. In a voiceover, James claims that he has realized what people mean to each other. A gunshot is heard as the scene fades to black.

=== Series 2 (2019) ===
No. overall	Episode	Directed by	Written by	Original release date
9	Episode 1	Lucy Forbes	Charlie Covell	4 November 2019
Bonnie is introduced. Her cruel and demanding mother contributed to her anti-social behaviour. After Bonnie fails her exams, she gets a job at a university library and pretends to be a student. She becomes obsessed with philosophy professor, Dr. Clive Koch, who discovers that she is not actually a student and bars her from his class. She then defiles his book and a poster of him with faeces, which he reacts to by allowing her to attend his class again. The two soon begin a sexual relationship; she is disappointed that he does not reciprocate her love. After she shows up unexpectedly at his house, finding him with another female student, he falsely claims the student is trying to ruin his life. In retaliation, Bonnie uses her car to kill her. In prison, Bonnie receives a message in a book from Koch in response to her killing stating that he now loves her. After sending a letter to him, she finds out that Koch is now dead. Two years later, after being released from prison, Bonnie sets out to take revenge against Alyssa and James.
10	Episode 2	Lucy Forbes	Charlie Covell	4 November 2019
Alyssa is now 19. After the events of the previous season, she was given a community service sentence for her crimes. Tony left Gwen. Due to the reaction to her misadventures, Alyssa's mother Gwen sold their house and moved in with Gwen's half-sister Leigh in the country. Alyssa is employed by Leigh as a waitress in her café. Alyssa meets Todd, whom she soon asks to marry. She receives a bullet with her name scratched on it in the mail that she does not take seriously. Over time, she notices that a red car has been following her, which she discovers James in. Flashbacks reveal that James survived his gunshot wound at the end of the previous season, recovered over a long time in the hospital, was found not guilty of murder, and given a suspended sentence for his other crimes. He is barred from seeing Alyssa and was pressured by Gwen to write a breakup letter to her. After his father suddenly dies, James begins living in his father's car, holding on to his father's ashes. He receives a bullet with his name on in the mail and decides that he needs to ensure Alyssa is safe. He begins to watch her, and is pleased that she appears to be doing well.
11	Episode 3	Lucy Forbes	Charlie Covell	4 November 2019
Alyssa is seemingly annoyed at seeing James again. They have a conversation about the bullets they both received, though Alyssa still does not take the threat seriously. The next day, Alyssa marries Todd and James receives his fixed car. As he drives off, he is stopped by Alyssa who had run away minutes after marrying. Whilst they have lunch, their car is taken away by a towing company, who demand £400 to release the car. James is indecisive and struggles to find the right time to tell Alyssa that he still loves her. They ram their way out of the tow yard and stop to pick up a hitchhiker, which turns out to be Bonnie.
12	Episode 4	Lucy Forbes	Charlie Covell	4 November 2019
Bonnie gets in the car after she surreptitiously punctures a tyre. When it runs flat, Alyssa and James call for a mechanic but when it turns out that the car cannot be fixed until morning, Bonnie offers to pay for a room at the motel where they are stuck for all three of them and have the car serviced by the mechanic the next day. They drink and leave Bonnie and the motel owner alone. When the motel owner enters Bonnie's room under a pretext and prepares to expose himself, she holds him at gunpoint. Intoxicated by the wine he had spiked with liquor, she accidentally drops the gun, which goes off upon hitting the floor and kills him. Alyssa and James kiss and she asks him for time to think about it again.
13	Episode 5	Destiny Ekaragha	Charlie Covell	4 November 2019
Alyssa, James, and Bonnie depart the hotel, their car fixed. They head to the chemist's so Bonnie can pick up medication for a cut on her back from the previous night. She leaves the gun in the bathroom, and the trio head to lunch. Bonnie notices she has forgotten the gun so they return to the chemist's shop; the chemist has confiscated the gun. Bonnie threatens him at knifepoint and gets the gun back, but James and Alyssa drive off.
14	Episode 6	Destiny Ekaragha	Charlie Covell	4 November 2019
Alyssa returns to her new husband to apologise and asks him for a divorce. As James departs Alyssa's town, he passes Bonnie headed in a car back towards Alyssa and realises something is wrong with her story. James follows Bonnie's movements as Bonnie stalks Alyssa. When Bonnie enters the diner Alyssa works at, James breaks into Bonnie's car to discover a copy of Dr Koch's book Existential Exit and the message left within just as Bonnie closes in on Alyssa for the kill.
15	Episode 7	Destiny Ekaragha	Charlie Covell	4 November 2019
A police officer investigates the murder of the motel owner. Bonnie stalks Alyssa and arrives at the diner where she works. She talks awkwardly with Alyssa and waits for the last customer to leave. James, who is watching the two of them from outside, calls the police. Bonnie reveals to Alyssa her murderous intent and her desire to seek revenge. The police officer abruptly visits the diner after responding to James' phone call. Alyssa attempts to covertly ask him for help, but he leaves after not realising anything was amiss. As he exits, he notices Bonnie's gun, and immediately alerts fellow authorities. Alyssa is left alone and Bonnie finds James hiding in the kitchen. She holds the two at gunpoint, where she demands to hear the truth of what happened, but refuses to believe them. Bonnie imagines shooting both of them, and they tell her that killing them will not help ease the pain. She decides to kill herself instead; James and Alyssa tackle and incapacitate her as the police arrive. Alyssa contemplates that it is easy for someone who has never been loved before to mistake something else for love.
16	Episode 8	Destiny Ekaragha	Charlie Covell	4 November 2019
Whilst James finishes his statement at the police station, Alyssa returns to Koch's home. James tracks her down, believing she may have harmed herself. Together, they reflect on their shared experiences there. James scatters his father's ashes at the underpass where his father and his mother met. They eat lunch together and Alyssa confesses she had earlier overheard James saying he loved her. She admits she feels the same, but adds that she will need time and therapy. They hold hands; James says "I love you too", and Alyssa responds "Yeah, don't go on about it".

== Production ==
=== Development ===
"I made a short film of it six years ago with the majority of the people who are still involved — Jonathan Entwistle, who directed the film (and some of the series), and Dominic Buchanan, who’s a producer. At that point, Charlie hadn’t actually finished the comic, so I along with everyone else who was a fan of it, waited for them all to come out."—Jessica Barden, January 2018

The series was based on the work of the same title by Charles Forsman. Originally self-published as a series of mini-comics, the series was published as a graphic novel by Fantagraphics Books in 2013. It was republished in hardback in 2017, in anticipation of the television series.

While Forsman was publishing the mini-comics, Jonathan Entwistle contacted him about adapting it to a visual format – the original idea was to make an American film, and later a web series was considered. A film was pitched to Film4, and Entwistle was given funding for a short. Made in 2014, it featured some cast and crew who continued their roles for the television series. Entwistle directed and Dominic Buchanan was producer; Jessica Barden played Alyssa. However, instead of Alex Lawther, James was played by Craig Roberts.

Though the short was well-received, no production companies wanted to invest in the idea as a full-length film. Entwistle and Buchanan decided to make a television series with Clerkenwell Films, following which Channel 4 and then Netflix became involved. Forsman had no official role in the show's production, wanting to continue working on his comics, though Entwistle would regularly consult him and keep him updated. In August 2018, Channel 4's director of programmes Ian Katz expressed frustration that many people think the programme is a Netflix original, saying that "it's absolutely a Channel 4 show".

The programme's plot differs from that of Forsman's comics. In print, the two kill a satanist serial killer, whose wife was a police officer; instead the television series features police officers Eunice Noon and Teri Darego, and does not show the serial killer to be a satanist. Another major difference is the ending of the graphic novel: the satanist police officer chases after James, and the two begin to attack each other, while police try to break up the fight. There is then a gunshot. In the final scene, Alyssa's mother talks about her daughter being safe from James, while Alyssa is seen carving the name "JAMES" into her arm. Some critics interpreted this to mean that James was dead, but Forsman sees the ending as ambiguous.

==== Continuation ====
The first series covered the entirety of the storyline in Forsman's original comics. On 25 January 2018, Jonathan Entwistle spoke of the potential for a second series. He confirmed that "We're exploring and we're seeing what we can do to expand the world and see where we get to." Entwistle then went on to say that Netflix was enthusiastic about a second series of the show if one could be conceived. Writer Charlie Covell said "I think there are a number of stories we could tell" and that they would "love to write more". Actor Alex Lawther stated in an interview that he would be "very excited" about a second series, as it would give Covell "a chance to explore something from her imagination". A second series was announced on 21 August 2018 on the official Channel 4 Twitter account.

Covell stated in October 2019, before the second series's release, that they do not intend to produce a third series for the programme. Covell went on to say "I think, for me, that's it now. Yeah, that's done. I think to try and eke more out would be wrong, I like where we've left it."

=== Filming ===
The first series began filming in April 2017 and concluded a few weeks before the show's release in October 2017. Though filmed in England, the programme has an American tone to it; Entwistle was inspired by Twin Peaks and Fargo. Episodes were filmed largely in suburban areas and across Surrey, with locations such as Guildford bus station, The Square shopping centre in Camberley, Woking and Longcross Studios. There was also some scenes in Bracknell in Berkshire. Another filming location was Leysdown-on-Sea on the Isle of Sheppey. Entwistle uses mostly close-up shots, particularly in early episodes where most frames feature only one character. He uses this for deadpan humour, by moving from face to face to get shots of characters' reactions.

The series is set in the present day, but Entwistle aimed to make it feel like it could have been set "any time from 1988 to 2006". Additionally, diners have a 1970s-style design, and the soundtrack features songs from the 1950s, 60s and 70s, along with original music from Graham Coxon, a founding member of Blur. Entwistle describes Coxon's scores as "guitar-based suburban noir", and notes that more of his music is used in later episodes for the police officers.

The second series began filming in March 2019. Production for the second season moved to southern Wales and the greater Bristol area. The woodland café was constructed within the Forest of Dean. Key locations in Wales were Port Talbot, Swansea, the Brecon Beacons National Park and the Afan Forest Park.

== Release ==
The eight-part programme premiered its first episode on Channel 4 in the United Kingdom on 24 October 2017, after which all eight episodes were released on All 4. The End of the F***ing World was a co-production with Netflix who exclusively released it internationally on 5 January 2018. On that weekend, sales of the graphic novel rose considerably, with Fantagraphics Books selling out of the current print run according to Forsman.

The second series premiered on Channel 4 on 4 November 2019, with two episodes being broadcast back-to-back daily until 7 November. The full series became available on All 4 after the Channel 4 premiere and internationally on Netflix the next day.

== Reception ==
=== Critical response ===
The End of the F***ing World has an overall approval rating of 94% on review aggregation website Rotten Tomatoes. The first series has an approval rating of 96% based on 52 reviews, with an average rating of 8.4/10. The site's consensus states, "Misanthropy and humor blend perfectly in this romantically nihilistic show that proves that falling in love can feel like The End of the F***ing World." The second series has an approval rating of 92% based on 37 reviews, with an average rating of 7.7/10. The site's consensus states, "What The End of the F***ing World's second season lacks in urgency it makes up for in character development, diving deep into the darkest creases of the leading pair's memories to emerge a darkly funny meditation on love and trauma."

On Metacritic, the series has an overall score of 77 out of 100, based on reviews from 21 critics, indicating "generally favourable reviews". The first series has a score of 81 out of 100, based on reviews from 12 critics, indicating "universal acclaim". The second series has a score of 71 out of 100, based on reviews from 9 critics, indicating "generally favourable reviews".

Reviewer Daniel Fienberg of The Hollywood Reporter lauded the programme's writing, characters, and soundtrack, as well as praising the performances of Alex Lawther and Jessica Barden, calling it a "pitch-black, eight-episode comedy gem of a UK import". Kelly Lawler of USA Today called it "batty fun", also praising Lawther and Barden's performances while praising the programme's surreal concept and execution.

=== Accolades ===
Year	Award	Category	Nominee(s)	Result	Ref.
2018	British Academy Television Awards	Best Drama Series	Production team	Nominated	
2018	Primetime Emmy Awards	Outstanding Cinematography for a Single-Camera Series (Half-Hour)	Justin Brown	Nominated	
2018	MTV Millennial Awards	Killer Series	The End of the F***ing World	Won	
2018	Royal Television Society Awards	Drama Series	The End of the F***ing World	Won	
2018	Royal Television Society Awards	Writing: Drama	Charlie Covell	Nominated	
2018	Royal Television Society Craft & Design Awards	Director - Drama	Jonathan Entwistle	Nominated	
2018	Royal Television Society Craft & Design Awards	Editing - Drama	Mike Jones	Nominated	
2018	Royal Television Society Craft & Design Awards	Music - Original Score	Graham Coxon	Nominated	
2018	Royal Television Society Craft & Design Awards	Photography - Drama & Comedy	Justin Brown	Won	
2019	Peabody Awards	Entertainment	The End of the F***ing World	Won	
2020	British Academy Television Awards	Best Drama Series	Production team	Won	
2020	British Academy Television Awards	Best Supporting Actress	Naomi Ackie	Won	
2020	Primetime Emmy Awards	Outstanding Cinematography for a Single-Camera Series (Half-Hour)	Benedict Spence	Nominated	
2020	Royal Television Society Craft & Design Awards	Director - Drama	Destiny Ekaragha	Nominated	
