= Chanya Button =

English director and screenwriter

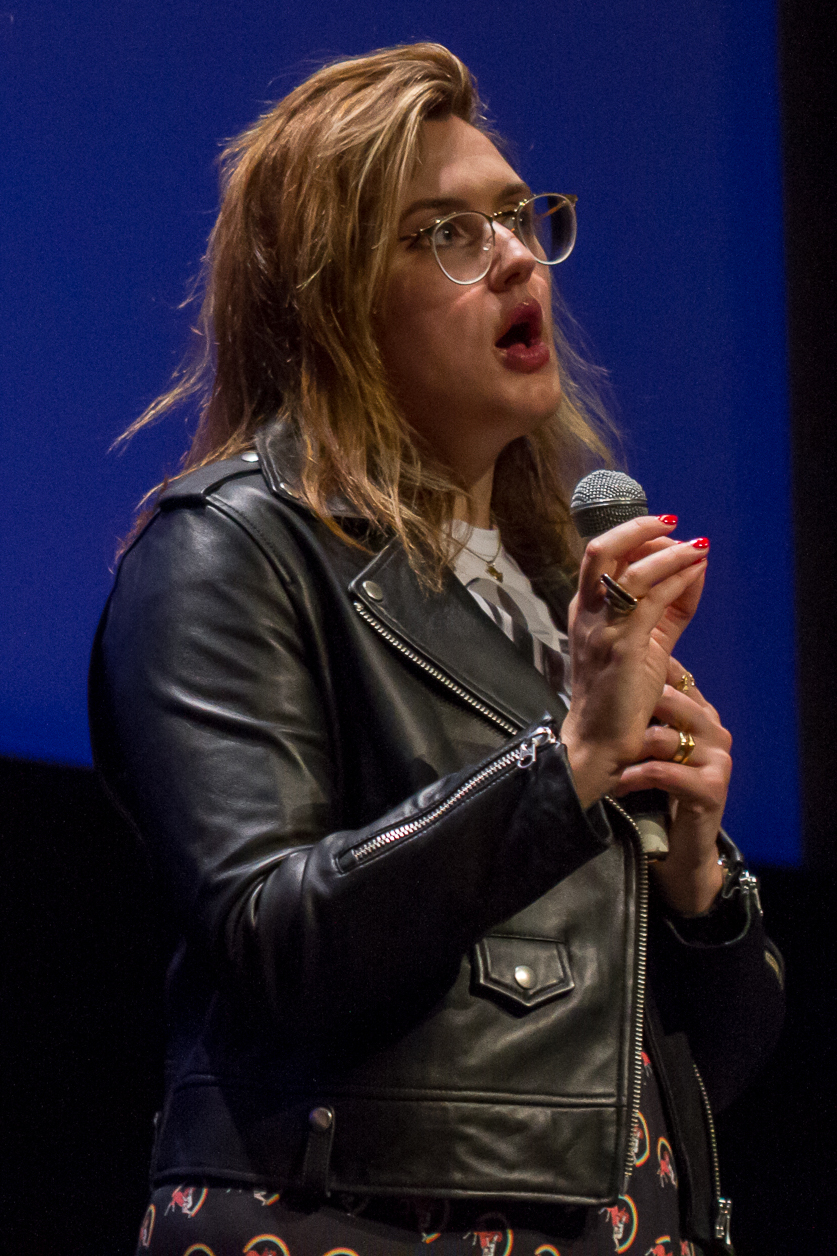
- Button at the 2018 Toronto International Film Festival screening of Vita & Virginia
- Born: Chanya Joyce Dorothy Button; 25 December 1986 (age 39); London, England
- Education: University of Oxford; Royal Academy of Dramatic Art
- Occupations: Director; screenwriter; producer
- Years active: 2011–present

Chanya Joyce Dorothy Button (born 25 December 1986) is an English director and screenwriter. After studying at RADA and learning the ropes in the assistant directors' department on the Harry Potter franchise, she directed two feature films, Burn Burn Burn (2015) and Vita & Virginia (2018), the latter of which she also co-wrote. She then moved on to television, directing the 2019 period dramas World on Fire and The Spanish Princess, as well as the final 60th anniversary special episode of Doctor Who, "The Giggle" (2023).

== Early life and education ==
Button was born in London on 25 December 1986. Her father is Roy Button, former executive vice-president and managing director of Warner Bros. Productions in the UK, who has worked behind the camera on over 300 films and was awarded an OBE in 2009 for services to the film industry. She therefore grew up on film sets and her earliest memories are of "wandering through elaborate film sets, spending whole weekends sitting on the back of a camera truck watching the machine of a film crew whir around me".

"My father is my mentor. [...] He's worked in the film industry for 40 years, and I've learned simply from watching him work: how to have a strong sense of your own taste, an unrelenting and passionate work ethic, and most importantly I've watched him treat absolutely everyone he works with, with kindness, sensitivity and respect. Even though we have very different tastes, and have taken very different paths into the film industry, the lesson I've learned from him that resonates most is that, if you treat people well, it's not only a respectful way to make work, but better work is made as a result."

— Button on her father

Button studied English Literature at the University of Oxford from 2005 to 2008. At the age of 18, she took part in the Royal Court Young Writers' Programme. During that time, she started directing theatre, choosing productions that aligned with the literature she was studying at Oxford. She gained experience as an assistant director at the Bush Theatre, the Tricycle Theatre and Shakespeare's Globe.

After graduating, she worked for the UK Film Council Film Fund in London, and then, shortly after, moved to Los Angeles to undertake work in the creative department at Warner Bros. Button also worked extensively as a runner and assistant director on big-budget features shot in the UK, notably on several Harry Potter films, Sherlock Holmes (2009) and Edge of Tomorrow (2014). In 2010, she received a master's degree in Theatre Directing from the Royal Academy of Dramatic Art.

"I [...] was making coffees and sweeping the floor, and sort of watching every department do their jobs – Stuart Craig, the production designer, amazing D.P.s like Eduardo Serra, and incredible hair and makeup designers like Amanda Knight and Lisa Tomblin... I had the privilege of observing all of that very young. I realised – as very lowly third A.D. – looking after actors like Helen McCrory and Helena Bonham Carter and Maggie Smith, waiting to take them to the set – I would hear them talking about a show they were going to do, and I realised I actually knew nothing about acting. But, I knew about literature, I knew about filmmaking. So I went to RADA and did the acting classes for a year, and rolled around in a leotard pretending to be a piece of seaweed."

— Button on working on the Harry Potter franchise and studying at the Royal Academy of Dramatic Art

Button has cited Tim Burton as her favourite director and listed epic '70s and '80s films like Empire of the Sun (1987), Gandhi (1982) and the Indiana Jones instalments among some of her absolute favourites. She once explained that she finds the way those films were made before huge advances in visual effects, CGI and the raft of technological support that the filmmakers use today "utterly romantic and inspirational".

== Career ==
She started her career as a director with three short films, written by Sex Education executive producer Siân Robins-Grace. Those included Frog/Robot (2011) starring Charlie Covell, Fire (2012) starring Richard Lintern as Charles Dickens and Charlotte Randle as his wife Catherine, and Alpha: Omega (2013) starring Sebastian Armesto. In 2012, her work was selected as part of the Directors Guild of America's New Directors to Watch showcase, and she also shot the music video for Matt Cardle's single "Anyone Else".

Button's debut feature film, the road-trip black comedy Burn Burn Burn, premiered at the BFI London Film Festival in October 2015 and was later acquired by Netflix. It was nominated for the Discovery Award at the 18th British Independent Film Awards, for an outstanding debut feature, and won the Grand Prix at the 7th Odesa International Film Festival in Ukraine. The Observer's film critic Wendy Ide concluded, "Burn Burn Burn is nicely acted and emotionally authentic. Button shows real promise as a director".

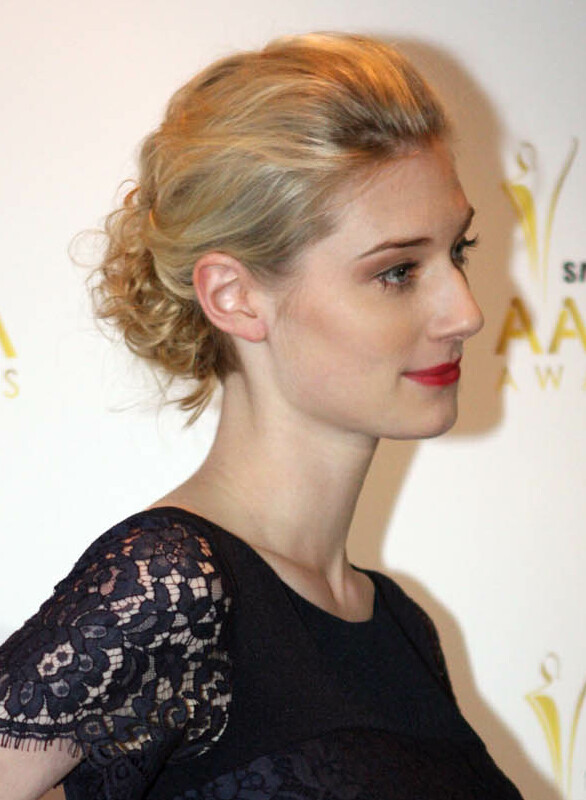
Elizabeth Debicki in 2012

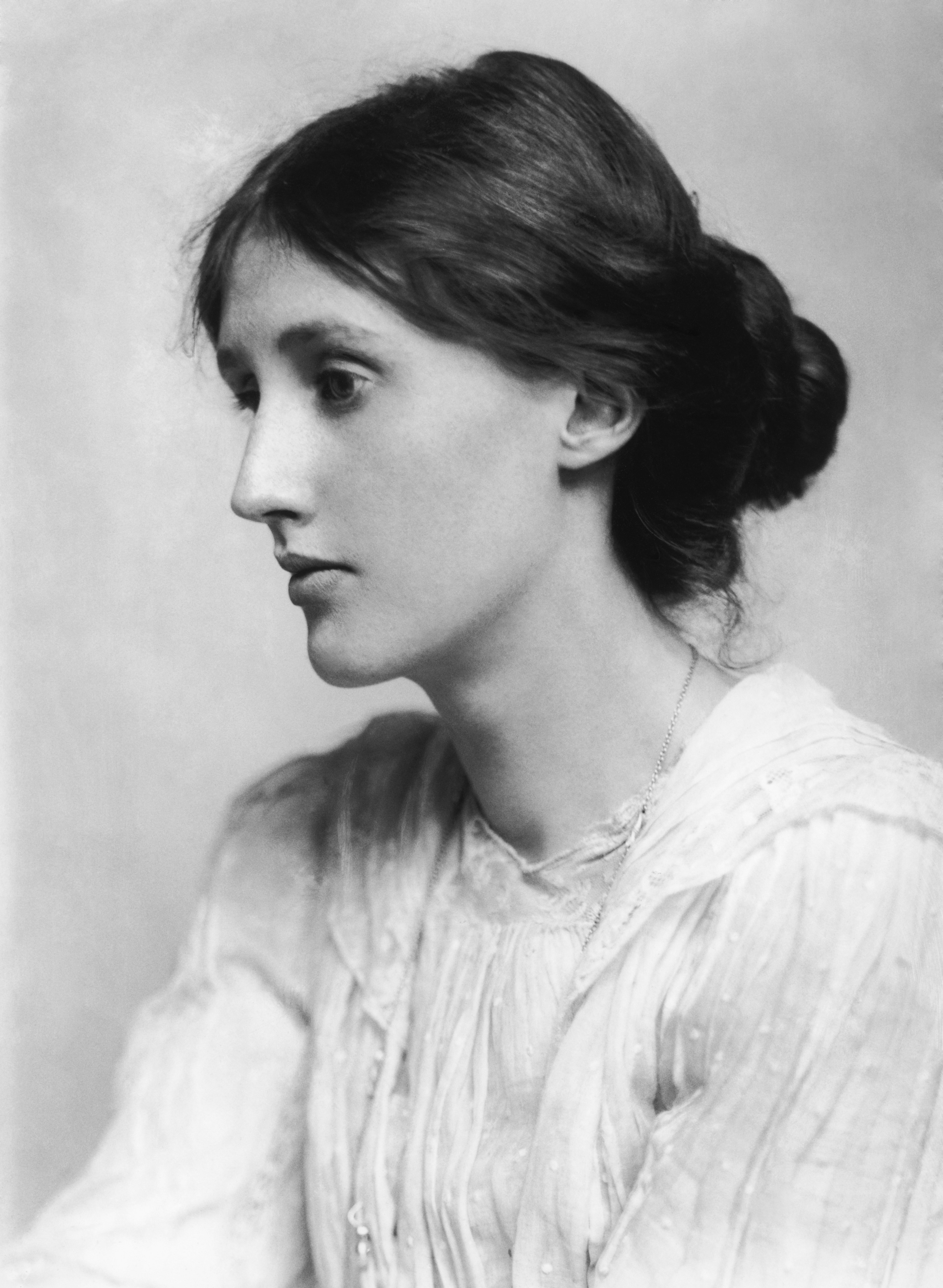
Virginia Woolf in 1902

Her second feature was the biographical romantic drama Vita & Virginia (2018), detailing the relationship between Vita Sackville-West (Gemma Arterton) and Virginia Woolf (Elizabeth Debicki) that culminated with the latter's writing of the novel Orlando: A Biography. Speaking about the inspiration behind the film that she also co-wrote with actress Eileen Atkins, Button said, "I have loved Virginia Woolf forever, since I could read! She taught me how to think about everything, she's the reason I became a director." Vita & Virginia received its world premiere at the 43rd Toronto International Film Festival and then went on to be the opening night film for both the 43rd Frameline Film Festival in San Francisco and the 33rd BFI Flare in London. Debicki's portrayal of Woolf was recognised with a nomination for Best Supporting Actress at the 22nd British Independent Film Awards.

Button then moved on to television work, directing two episodes of the BBC One war drama World on Fire (2019), dealing with the Dunkirk evacuation and the Nazi occupation of Paris, as well as several episodes of the Starz limited historical drama The Spanish Princess (2020) and the Acorn TV crime drama Whitstable Pearl (2021). In 2022, she directed the third and final 60th anniversary special episode of the BBC's science fiction television series Doctor Who, written by Russell T Davies and starring David Tennant and Catherine Tate. Titled "The Giggle", it aired on BBC One in the UK and on Disney+ internationally on 9 December 2023 and earned Button a nomination for the Hugo Award for Best Dramatic Presentation the following year.

== Filmography ==
=== Film ===
Key
†	Denotes productions that have not yet been released

Year	Title	Director	Writer	Producer	Notes	Ref.
2011	Frog/Robot	Yes	No	No	Short film	
2012	Fire	Yes	No	Yes	Short film	
2013	Alpha: Omega	Yes	Yes	Yes	Short film	
2015	Burn Burn Burn	Yes	No	Yes	Based on an idea by Button and Charlie Covell; cameo as a stage manager	
2018	Vita & Virginia	Yes	Yes	No	Co-written with Eileen Atkins	
TBA	Our Fault: London †	Yes	No	No	In development	

=== Television ===
Year	Title	Director	Writer	Notes	Ref.
2019	World on Fire	Yes	No	2 episodes: #1.5; #1.6	
2020	The Spanish Princess	Yes	No	3 episodes: "Camelot"; "Flodden"; "Grief"	
2021	Whitstable Pearl	Yes	No	2 episodes: "A Cup O' Kindness"; "The Man on the Blue Plaque"	
2023	The Killing Kind	Yes	No	Episodes 4–6	
2023	Doctor Who	Yes	No	Episode: "The Giggle"	
2025	Code of Silence	Yes	No	Episodes 4–6	
2027	Hercule	Yes	No	Episodes 3–4	

== Awards and nominations ==
Year	Award	Category	Work	Result	Ref.
2015	British Independent Film Awards	Discovery Award	Burn Burn Burn	Nominated	
2016	Cinema City	Audience Award	Burn Burn Burn	Won	
2016	Umbria Film Festival	Audience Award	Burn Burn Burn	Won	
2016	Odesa International Film Festival	Grand Prix	Burn Burn Burn	Won	
2016	Odesa International Film Festival	International Competition	Burn Burn Burn	Nominated	
2016	Reel Q: Pittsburgh International LGBT Film Festival	Audience Award for Best Women's Film	Burn Burn Burn	Won	
2017	Sedona International Film Festival	Directors' Choice Award for Best Feature Comedy	Burn Burn Burn	Won	
2024	Hugo Award	Best Dramatic Presentation (Short Form)	Doctor Who: "The Giggle"	Nominated	
