= List of A.N.T. Farm episodes =

A.N.T. Farm is a Disney Channel original series that follows Chyna Parks (China Anne McClain) and her two best friends, Olive Doyle (Sierra McCormick) and Fletcher Quimby (Jake Short), who are in the "Advanced Natural Talents" (A.N.T.) program for gifted middle schoolers at Webster High School in San Francisco. Disney renewed A.N.T. Farm for its second season November 30, 2011. Filming for season two began in early February 2012. On October 2, 2012, Disney Channel officially renewed A.N.T. Farm for a third season.

== Series overview ==
Season	Episodes	Originally released	
Season	Episodes	First released	Last released
1	25	May 6, 2011	April 13, 2012
2	20	June 1, 2012	April 26, 2013
3	17	May 31, 2013	March 21, 2014

== Episodes ==
=== Season 1 (2011–12) ===
No. overall	No. in season	Title	Directed by	Written by	Original release date	Prod. code	U.S. viewers (millions)
1	1	"transplANTed"	Bob Koherr	Dan Signer	May 6, 2011	101	4.44
Chyna Parks joins the A.N.T. Program (Advanced Natural Talent) at Webster High because she is a musical prodigy. Chyna and her ANT friends, Fletcher Quimby and Olive Doyle, find out about a school party being hosted by Lexi Reed, the Queen Bee diva, who has starred in every school play. They sneak out of Chyna's house to attend the party after Fletcher makes wax copies of them. Chyna, Fletcher, and Olive accidentally ruin Lexi's party by crashing into the sound system, causing everyone to turn on Chyna, including Olive and Fletcher. However, she makes things better by singing "Dynamite". When Chyna's father catches them at the party, after spotting their melted wax figures, he almost pulls Chyna out of the A.N.T. Program, but Chyna levels it down to three months of grounding. Guest stars: Finesse Mitchell as Darryl, Allie DeBerry as Paisley, Zach Steel as Gibson, Mark Teich as Mr. Zimbaldi, Elise Neal as Roxanne, Aedin Mincks as Angus, Connor Weil as Legan
2	2	"participANTs"	Bob Koherr	Jeny Quine	June 17, 2011	102	4.33
Chyna and Olive make an effort to be more involved with their school's extracurricular activities and try out for the cheerleading squad, run by Lexi and Paisley. Only Chyna gets accepted into the squad, however it's only so Lexi can sabotage Chyna's chances of landing the lead at the school musical auditions. She weakens her enough to make her lose her voice as well as injures Chyna so she'd be physically incapacitated enough to bomb the audition. During the school musical auditions, Chyna sings horribly and gives an impassioned speech to Mr. Zimbaldi, which convinces him to give her the lead role. Meanwhile, Cameron creates his own club called "The End Hunger Today Club" as an excuse to eat hot wings all for himself, but when Fletcher catches him in the act and threatens to tell Principal Skidmore about his fake club, Cameron is forced to let Fletcher join. Principal Skidmore notices the club and wants to join as well. Guest stars: Allie DeBerry as Paisley, Zach Steel as Gibson, Mindy Sterling as Susan Skidmore, Mark Teich as Mr. Zimbaldi, Aedin Mincks as Angus
3	3	"the phANTom locker"	Bob Koherr	Mark Jordan Legan	June 24, 2011	103	4.64
Cameron is annoyed by Olive, his locker neighbor, so he invents a story that her locker was built above an ancient burial ground and is haunted. Olive then moves into Chyna's locker to avoid the ghost, but ends up annoying Chyna to the point where she devises a scheme to make Olive face her fears. That night, Olive and Chyna try to spend the night in Olive's locker, but while Cameron is "haunting" them, he also wrecks the prank and Olive and Chyna discover his plan. Meanwhile, Fletcher is having problems with making Principal Skidmore look beautiful in a self-portrait. Guest stars: Mindy Sterling as Susan Skidmore, Aedin Mincks as Angus
4	4	"sciANTs fair"	Phill Lewis	Jeff Hodsden & Tim Pollock	July 1, 2011	106	2.75
Chyna wants to stay up to watch High Heels High and Darryl gives her special permission if she studies after a couple of episodes; however, she stays up all night, and when she aces her science exam, she thinks that the teachers are giving her and the ANTs special treatment so they can compete and win trophies for Webster High. Chyna tries to prove this only to wreck Olive's science fair project by accident and the two girls fail. They soon learn that the only reason Chyna passed was because their teacher was too tired to grade the exam properly. Meanwhile, Lexi and Cameron find Principal Skidmore's phone and keep it to receive the reward. Guest stars: Finesse Mitchell as Darryl, Mindy Sterling as Susan Skidmore, Chris Wylde as Mr. Marceau, Carrie Reichenbach as Justine
5	5	"studANT council"	Bob Koherr	Tim Pollock & Jeff Hodsden	July 8, 2011	107	3.50
After Chyna is denied entrance to the school dance, Olive tricks Chyna into running for student council. As she is campaigning, Angus tells her that to run for A.N.T. Rep, she has to participate in every school activity (including being a human cannonball, being the "Jumbo bunny" prize for whoever wins a game at the school fair and being the mirror ball at prom), so Chyna tricks Olive into running too. They both tell everyone to vote for the other candidate. During the election, Olive is winning by a short gap. Cameron makes a speech while Chyna and Olive argue and everyone agrees with him. Lexi runs for school president and wins. Somehow, Cameron is nominated for A.N.T. Rep and gets the title because according to Lexi, students under five feet automatically run for A.N.T. Rep when they are nominated. Meanwhile, Fletcher befriends Chyna's dad to see if he has a possibility with Chyna, but Cameron gets jealous. He eventually finds out what is going on and tells his dad. In the end, Cameron hangs out with his dad and Fletcher is left alone. Guest stars: Finesse Mitchell as Darryl, Allie DeBerry as Paisley, Aedin Mincks as Angus
6	6	"bad romANTs"	Bob Koherr	Jeny Quine	July 15, 2011	105	3.95
Gibson is depressed about his grandma moving out, so Chyna and Fletcher try to cheer him up. When he keeps following them, ruining Fletcher's chances of getting closer to Chyna, they try to find Gibson a girlfriend. When they learn Gibson is still hung up on his girlfriend Sophie (whom he dated while they were both three years old), Chyna and Fletcher try to track her down, only to find that she is incarcerated for robbing a bank. Gibson and Sophie continue their relationship, the former oblivious to the fact that she is in prison (he thinks she literally lives in a "big house"). Meanwhile, Lexi tries to get on the front page of the school newspaper, but must show Olive that she has done something newsworthy. Guest stars: Zach Steel as Gibson, Allie DeBerry as Paisley, Aedin Minks [sic] as Angus Absent: Carlon Jeffery as Cameron Parks
7	7	"the informANT"	Bob Koherr	Stephen Engel	July 29, 2011	104	3.06
After Darryl gets Chyna a bag from the evidence locker at the police station, she pretends to appreciate the thought of the gift, but when Fletcher tells Chyna and Olive about "Pudding Points", a contest with a prize for eating enough pudding, she collects several pudding containers from the trash as well as tries to eat as much as possible to win a new designer bag. Darryl finds the new bag inside the bag he gave her and accuses her of shoplifting. He sends a police officer, Officer 3–9, undercover as a student named Charlie Brown to spy on her. When Chyna, Fletcher, and Olive find out that Charlie Brown is a cop, they pretend that they are robbing a house with Charlie as an accomplice. Guest stars: Finesse Mitchell as Darryl, Mark Povinelli as Officer 3-9
8	8	"replicANT"	Adam Weissman	Dan Signer	August 12, 2011	108	3.72
Chyna falls for a new student in the A.N.T. Program from the United Kingdom named Nigel, another artistic genius who goes to Webster High not in person but as a robot. Chyna asks Nigel out and they embark on a date, making Fletcher jealous. Meanwhile, Cameron challenges Olive at the arcade to see who can get the highest score on the game Donkey King (a parody of Donkey Kong). Guest stars: Finesse Mitchell as Darryl, Zach Steel as Gibson, Aedin Mincks as Angus, Noah Alexander Gerry as Nigel Absent: Stefanie Scott as Lexi Reed
9	9	"clairvoyANT"	Adam Weissman	Stephen Engel	August 19, 2011	109	3.50
Principal Skidmore gives out Wacky Awards and everyone receives one except for Cameron, so Chyna and Olive try to help him find his talent. They make him believe that he is a psychic by making everything he predicts happen. Meanwhile, Fletcher finds out that the dinosaur nuggets at the cafeteria have been replaced; he goes to the board meeting to get them back. In the end Cameron finally knows he's not psychic after he predicts the end of the world and it does not happen. Guest stars: Mindy Sterling as Susan Skidmore, Elise Neal as Roxanne, Allie DeBerry as Paisley, Aedin Mincks as Angus Absent: Stefanie Scott as Lexi Reed
10	10	"managemANT"	Mark Cendrowski	Mark Jordan Legan & Jeny Quine	August 26, 2011	110	3.57
Cameron accidentally uploads a video of Chyna singing. To her luck, Hippo, a music producer, sees it and wants to make a music video, but Chyna refuses after he tries to change her image. Hippo says films are in and music is out, so he ends up doing Cameron's movie instead of Chyna's song. Meanwhile, Fletcher, Paisley, Olive, and Angus compete in home economics. Guest stars: Mindy Sterling as Susan Skidmore, Allie DeBerry as Paisley, Aedin Mincks as Angus, Matt Lowe as Hippo Absent: Stefanie Scott as Lexi Reed
11	11	"philANThropy"	Phill Lewis	Mark Jordan Legan & Jeny Quine	September 16, 2011	111	3.18
When the school cannot afford to pay Gibson's salary, he gets fired, so Chyna, Olive, and Fletcher try to raise money by doing a web-a-thon called "Save Gibson". Meanwhile, Cameron pretends to be an elderly man because Lexi needs to show a former pageant queen that she volunteers at a senior center in order to keep her pageant crown. Special guest star: Shelley Long as Mrs. Busby Guest stars: Mindy Sterling as Susan Skidmore, Zach Steel as Gibson, Allie DeBerry as Paisley
12	12	"fraudulANT"	Phill Lewis	Jeff Hodsden & Tim Pollock	September 23, 2011	112	2.61
Chyna and Fletcher meet Zanko (Ernie Grunwald), Fletcher's all-time favorite artist. Zanko is having trouble with inspiration, so Chyna urges Fletcher to give Zanko one of his paintings to inspire him, but when Zanko passes the painting off as his own at his comeback party, Chyna creates an elite team to rescue the painting and gets the help of Olive, Angus, and Wacky. Meanwhile, Paisley and Lexi audition to be a princess for a kid's birthday party for Chyna's mother, Roxanne. Guest stars: Allie DeBerry as Paisley, Aedin Mincks as Angus, Elise Neal as Roxanne, Ernie Grunwald as Zanko, Jay Brian Winnick as Buford, Simone Lopez as Kate Absent: Carlon Jeffery as Cameron Parks
13	13	"the replacemANT"	Phill Lewis	Mark Jordan Legan	September 30, 2011	113	3.36
Olive becomes the new history teacher after the previous one quits due to Chyna unintentionally upsetting him. Olive decides to be a fun teacher, but her kind of educational fun that involves reenactments of historical events ends up with her being spit-balled by the other students. So Chyna tells her to demand respect, but she overdoes it by becoming mean and giving both Chyna and Lexi detention, forcing the rivals to team up to get rid of her. Meanwhile, Cameron accompanies Darryl in a police ride-along for a school report. Guest stars: Finesse Mitchell as Darryl, Mindy Sterling as Susan Skidmore, Ben Begley as Mr. McMillan, Scott Freeburg as Perp
14	14	"mutANT farm"	Adam Weissman	Jeny Quine & Dan Signer	October 7, 2011	118	3.84
In this Halloween version of the pilot episode "transplANTed", it is Chyna's first day in the "MUTANT Program", where the ANTs and Gibson are monsters and the older kids are regular humans. Chyna is a Medusa, so she fits right in with her new Mutant Program friends: Olive, a mad scientist; Fletcher, a vampire; and Angus, a zombie. The social hierarchy roles have been reversed and the older kids are actually scared of the ANTs, so Gibson pairs everybody off to help prepare for the "mutants only" Halloween dance. Guest stars: Zach Steel as Gibson, Finesse Mitchell as Darryl, Allie DeBerry as Paisley, Aedin Mincks as Angus
15	15	"cANTonese style cuisine"	Adam Weissman	Dan Signer	October 28, 2011	115	3.22
Chyna is excited to meet Madam Goo Goo (a parody of Lady Gaga) and gets her phone number; however, when the ANTs go to a fortune cookie factory, Chyna realizes she lost Madam Goo Goo's phone number in the vat of fortunes. Olive, Fletcher, and Angus help her get it back. Meanwhile, Lexi finds out she was not invited to McKenna's birthday party and vows to find why. Guest stars: Allie DeBerry as Paisley, Aedin Mincks as Angus, James Hong as Kenny, Zibby Allen as Madam Goo Goo, Celesta DeAstis as McKenna Absent: Carlon Jeffery as Cameron Parks
16	16	"ignorANTs is bliss"	Adam Weissman	Jeff Hodsden & Tim Pollock	November 4, 2011	116	3.49
When a deafening noise caused by Fletcher makes Olive lose her memory, Chyna, Fletcher, and Angus go to great lengths to get her memory back before Principal Skidmore dismisses her from the A.N.T. Program and sends her to kindergarten. Chyna later finds out that Olive actually regained her memory but is pretending that she has not. Meanwhile, Lexi and Cameron enter the Webster High dog show hosted by Gibson. Guest stars: Zach Steel as Gibson, Mindy Sterling as Susan Skidmore, Aedin Mincks as Angus
17	17	"slumber party ANTics"	Jon Rosenbaum	Mark Jordan Legan	November 18, 2011	114	3.61
Chyna and Olive decide to host their own slumber party when Lexi does not invite them to hers. Chyna realizes that none of her guests have arrived except for Olive. Lexi video chats with her and to Chyna's dismay, all of her guests are at Lexi's slumber party. Chyna gets an idea since Olive painted her wall green, she will use it as a green screen. Chyna video chats Lexi and Lexi is jealous when she sees how much fun they are having, not knowing that it is a party scene from an old movie used as Chyna and Olive's background. Meanwhile, Fletcher agrees to help Cameron create a comic book character in order to get closer to Chyna. Guest star: Allie DeBerry as Paisley
18	18	"america needs talANT"	Victor Gonzalez	Jeny Quine & Dan Signer	November 25, 2011	122–123	3.41
A reality show called "America Needs Talent" arrives at Webster High, and everyone auditions to be on it; however, the only people who get picked to be finalists on the show are Chyna and Lexi. Unfortunately, Darryl is afraid of flying, so Chyna, Olive, Fletcher, Cameron, and Darryl end up driving to Los Angeles and end up in Solvang, California, where they get harassed by a walrus and get imprisoned in a windmill jail. Eventually they end up on the turbine of the windmill; Chyna rescues them by slipping through the bars covered in fish oil to slip through and flip the switch to stop it. While this is happening, Lexi's suitcase at the hotel in Hollywood is mistaken for a suitcase filled with money, so Lexi and Paisley try to find it. Later on, Chyna arrives just in time for the show, and both Chyna and Lexi make it to the final round. Lexi then pretends to be Chyna's friend to steal her song and humiliate her on the show, but Chyna overhears Lexi telling Paisley her plan and gives Lexi a fake song, costume design and props to use for the show. Lexi ends up as the one who gets humiliated, but after both performances, Chyna tells Lexi that there is enough spotlight for both of them. Meanwhile, Olive and Paisley enter a game show and Paisley keeps pressing the buzzer with goofy answers. Cameron, Fletcher, and Darryl wait in line at a popular food truck. Guest stars: Zach Steel as Gibson, Finesse Mitchell as Darryl, Allie DeBerry as Paisley, Aedin Mincks as Angus, Barry Williams as Game Show Host, Michael Carbonaro as Nicky G, Noah James Butler as Lars, Armen Torosyan as Demitri Note: This is a special double-length episode.
19	19	"sANTa's little helpers"	Jon Rosenbaum	Niya Palmer	December 9, 2011	119	3.05
Principal Skidmore asks Chyna, Olive, and Fletcher to build toys for kids at an orphanage. They find out that it is a scam and instead Principal Skidmore sells it for profit. They then booby-trap the toys, but Principal Skidmore has a change of heart and gives the toys to the orphanage, so they must get the toys back. Meanwhile, Darryl follows Roxanne around to see what she is getting him for Christmas. Guest stars: Finesse Mitchell as Darryl, Mindy Sterling as Susan Skidmore, Allie DeBerry as Paisley, Elise Neal as Roxanne, Al Hodek as Nick, Francesca Capaldi as Orphan
20	20	"you're the one that I wANT"	Steve Hoefer	Megan Amram	January 20, 2012	121	2.66
When Chyna gets the lead in the school musical, Lexi tries to sabotage the show with the help of Fletcher, who does not want Chyna to fall for the leading man, Jared. Meanwhile, Cameron learns that Gibson has been living at the school and offers to let him stay in his family's living room. Guest stars: Zach Steel as Gibson, Finesse Mitchell as Darryl, Mark Teich as Mr. Zimbaldi, Cameron Palatas as Jared, Terry Ray as Samuel French
21	21	"performANTs"	Victor Gonzalez	Dan Signer	January 27, 2012	120	2.66
Chyna, Olive, Fletcher, and Angus want to go to a horror punk band's concert, but they know Roxanne will never let them go if she knows what kind of band it is. In order to convince her, they pretend they are going to see a kid's band, which backfires when she decides to tag along. Meanwhile, Cameron tries to get backstage at the concert by getting a job as a tattoo artist. Guest stars: Aedin Mincks as Angus, Elise Neal as Roxanne, Jessika Van as Sunshine
22	22	"some enchANTed evening"	Adam Weissman	Stephen Engel	February 24, 2012	117	3.04
Fletcher asks Chyna out. Olive tells her to lie so she does not hurt Fletcher's feelings. Chyna says that she has a boyfriend so Fletcher lies and says he has a girlfriend. Olive suggests they should double date so the two must find fake dates. Meanwhile, Gibson coaches the cheerleading team because Coach Mandy died, but Lexi wants to win an upcoming cheerleading contest and thinks he is a bad coach. She fires him, and Gibson shows up at the contest with his own team. Guest stars: Zach Steel as Gibson, Allie DeBerry as Paisley, Aedin Mincks as Angus, Caroline Sunshine as Ella, Cameron Palatas as Jared Absent: Carlon Jeffery as Cameron Parks
23	23	"patANT pending"	Bob Koherr	Stephen Engel & Mark Jordan Legan	March 2, 2012	125	2.78
Olive and Fletcher come up with an idea for a massaging backpack after seeing Chyna struggle with hers. Afraid of mixing friendship with business, Olive and Fletcher decide to keep an inquiring Chyna out of the loop. Meanwhile, Lexi keeps fake breaking her arms and legs, and evens pretends to just be a head, to get the attention away from Paisley, who actually breaks her bones because of Lexi's scams. Guest stars: Zach Steel as Gibson, Allie DeBerry as Paisley, Aedin Mincks as Angus Absent: Carlon Jeffery as Cameron Parks
24	24	"ballet dANTser"	Bob Koherr	Jeff Hodsden & Tim Pollock	March 30, 2012	126	2.46
Violet, a sports prodigy with slight anger issues, joins the A.N.T. Program. Violet is not afraid of the older kids, including Lexi, who orders Chyna to keep the girl far away from her. Meanwhile, some of the older students take a drivers-education class. Guest stars: Finesse Mitchell as Darryl, Allie DeBerry as Paisley, Aedin Mincks as Angus, Claire Engler as Violet
25	25	"body of evidANTs"	Stephen Engel	Stephen Engel	April 13, 2012	124	3.44
Olive is shocked to discover that her pet robot, Hegel, is no longer functioning and has suspicious screwdriver scratches on his back. When a screwdriver is found in Chyna's locker, Chyna suspects that she has been framed and vows to find the real culprit. In the end, it is revealed that Chyna accidentally overfed Hegel which caused him to shut down. Various characters like Angus, Fletcher, etc. are revealed to be thinking they murdered Hegel by accident as well. Guest stars: Zach Steel as Gibson, Finesse Mitchell as Darryl, Mindy Sterling as Susan Skidmore, Aedin Mincks as Angus, Mews Small as Dakota Absent: Carlon Jeffery as Cameron Parks

=== Season 2 (2012–13) ===
No. overall	No. in season	Title	Directed by	Written by	Original release date	Prod. code	U.S. viewers (millions)
26	1	"creative consultANT"	Rich Correll	Dan Signer & Jeny Quine	June 1, 2012	207	2.78
Sequoia Jones, a famous actress, arrives at Webster High and is looking for a prodigy to play in her movie. Chyna decides to take the part and Sequoia shadows Chyna, which leads to her stealing Chyna's identity and personality. When Chyna tries to perform, Sequoia knocks her out and ties her above a shark tank, but Angus and Olive save her. Sequoia later mentions that everything was part of her movie, but she still mocks Chyna while she is performing her song "DNA" on stage. Meanwhile, Cameron and Fletcher try to sneak into a little kids movie without being caught by anyone from school, but Lexi appears at the theatre to watch a horror movie, only to find out that she wanted to see the kids movie too. Special guest star: Zendaya as Sequoia Guest stars: Finesse Mitchell as Darryl, Aedin Mincks as Angus, Ella Anderson as Hazel
27	2	"infANT"	Adam Weissman	Jeny Quine & Dan Signer	June 1, 2012	201	2.95
Principal Skidmore drops off a baby, Sebastian, in the A.N.T. Program, being left in the gang's care. Thought to be a prodigy, they try to uncover the baby's prodigal aptitude. In the end, Skidmore reveals that Sebastian is actually her nephew and not a prodigy; she just did not want to take care of him, so she left them with the ANTs. Meanwhile, Cameron is jealous because Angus was at Lexi's house and he thinks Lexi likes Angus. But Cameron finds out that Angus was just fixing her computer. Guest stars: Finesse Mitchell as Darryl, Mindy Sterling as Susan Skidmore, Aedin Mincks as Angus, Claire Engler as Violet, Jaxen and Masen Willert as Baby Sebastian
28	3	"fANTasy girl" (Part 1)	Adam Weissman	Tim Pollock & Jeff Hodsden	June 8, 2012	202	2.72
Chyna and Olive raise money for a school dance by selling Fletcher's paintings, but they accidentally tell their customer that Fletcher is dead. Meanwhile, Cameron asks the new girl, Jeanne at school to be his date for the dance. It turns out she was imaginary, as Cameron hallucinated her because he could not face the fact that no one would go to the dance with him. Guest stars: Aedin Mincks as Angus, Claire Engler as Violet, Vanessa Morgan as Jeanne, Kyle More as Gnocchi
29	4	"modeling assignmANT" (Part 2)	Sean McNamara	Mark Jordan Legan & Stephen Engel	June 22, 2012	205	3.23
Chyna helps Cameron impress Vanessa, a model he has a crush on (his imaginary girlfriend in the previous episode was derived from a picture of her on a magazine). Meanwhile, Lexi gets a job at Hippo's new restaurant, and trying to make Lexi miserable at her job, Olive and Fletcher change the theme of the restaurant to make her life a wreck, but it backfires every time. Guest stars: Aedin Mincks as Angus, Vanessa Morgan as Vanessa, Matt Lowe as Hippo
30	5	"ANTswers"	Sean McNamara	Dan Signer & Jeny Quine	June 29, 2012	206	3.40
Webster High's internet access is shut down, but the ANTs use their advanced skills to help students find information they would normally get online. Meanwhile, Paisley is upset because her parrots are fighting. Chyna, Olive, and Fletcher try to help her, and they misinterpreted "parrots" with "parents". Elsewhere, Lexi gets jealous of Cameron's girlfriend, Vanessa, because she gets a modeling job position she wanted. Guest stars: Mindy Sterling as Susan Skidmore, Allie DeBerry as Paisley, Aedin Mincks as Angus, Vanessa Morgan as Vanessa, Matt Lowe as Hippo
31	6	"the ANTagonist"	Victor Gonzalez	Jeff Hodsden & Tim Pollock	July 6, 2012	208	2.81
After Fletcher creates a cartoon that is disliked by everyone, Chyna gives him advice and tells him to create a cartoon about his life. At the premiere of his new cartoon, Fletcher reveals a comedy called Antics where he portrays Olive in an unflattering way. Meanwhile, Cameron joins the beauty club to keep Vanessa away from other boys. Things take an unexpected turn when Vanessa gets jealous because she believes every girl cannot keep their eyes off Cameron, so she ends up breaking up with him. Guest stars: Zach Steel as Gibson, Aedin Mincks as Angus, Vanessa Morgan as Vanessa
32	7	"endurANTs"	Victor Gonzalez	Jeny Quine & Dan Signer	July 13, 2012	209	2.96
The ANTs go to an Australian A.N.T. Convention. Chyna befriends an Australian nature prodigy named Neville (Billy Unger), who stars on a show, Tasmanian Neville. When Fletcher discovers Chyna has a crush on Neville, he wants to prove that he has "manly skills", so he is dropped off in the Australian Outback. Chyna, Olive, Angus, and Neville embark on a journey to save him. In the end Chyna hints that she actually finds Fletcher attractive for other girls. Elsewhere, Lexi and Paisley disguise themselves as ANTs and participate in the ANTlympics in order to win the grand prize. Guest stars: Zach Steel as Gibson, Aedin Mincks as Angus, Allie DeBerry as Paisley, Billy Unger as Neville, Catero Colbert as Matari, Andrew Pifko as Bruce, Olivia Rose Keegan as Australian Girl Absent: Carlon Jeffery as Cameron Parks
33	8	"amusemANT park"	Victor Gonzalez	Mark Jordan Legan & Stephen Engel	July 20, 2012	211	3.42
The ANTs are spending their day at the amusement park. Olive is utterly disappointed because her mother is making her donate all of her dolls, so she enters one in a doll beauty pageant to prove that her dolls are not worthless, alongside Lexi and Paisley. Meanwhile, Chyna and Cameron accidentally spend all of their money. Since their mother is expecting change, they set up a fake booth to get their money back. Elsewhere, Fletcher and Angus ride the rollercoaster numerous times in order to get a good picture. Guest stars: Aedin Mincks as Angus, Allie DeBerry as Paisley, Ella Anderson as Hazel, Michael Oosterom as Bernie
34	9	"contestANTs"	Victor Gonzalez	Dan Signer & Jeny Quine	August 10, 2012	212	2.80
Both Chyna and Lexi are determined to take home the $1,000 cash prize at a local carnival's Salute to Friendship Singing contest. Meanwhile, Cameron and Fletcher spend the afternoon hunting down Duncan the Dragon, a carnival character, who they think has stolen Fletcher's wallet. Guest stars: Aedin Mincks as Angus, Allie DeBerry as Paisley, Darin Toonder as Chip, Hayley Erin as Duncan
35	10	"confinemANT"	Victor Gonzalez	Tim Pollock & Jeff Hodsden	August 24, 2012	213	3.55
When Olive discovers that funding cuts will affect the art and music programs, the ANTs plan to crash the school board meeting in order to convince them not to cut any programs or else Chyna and Fletcher will be forced to leave. Elsewhere, Lexi is devastated when everyone stops paying attention to her and instead pay attention to the morning announcements that Cameron hosts.
36	11	"intelligANT"	Rich Correll	Stephen Engel & Mark Jordan Legan	September 7, 2012	214	2.39
When the ANTs take the IQ test, Olive is devastated when Chyna receives a higher score than her, so Olive decides to dumb herself down and starts acting like a dumb blonde. Since Chyna got the highest IQ score in the entire school, Principal Skidmore chose her to represent Webster High in the academic decathlon although Chyna does not want to. After failing in the first two challenges, Olive takes over and wins. It is later revealed that Angus changed Olive and Chyna's IQ test scores in an attempt to lower Olive's self esteem so she would go out with him. Meanwhile, Lexi and Cameron train to compete in curling in the Olympics along with Gibson in order to be excused from P.E.
37	12	"significANT other"	Rich Correll	Stephen Engel & Mark Jordan Legan	September 21, 2012	215	2.62
Chyna, tired of Fletcher always asking her out, seeks advice from Lexi. She advises her to say yes and he will grow tired, but it does not turn out well so she tells Chyna to be a jerk and criticize everything he does, but he ends up asking her to be his date to his cousin's wedding. When Chyna asks Lexi to help her deal with it, she is mean about it, upsetting him. At the wedding Chyna apologises with a performance of the good things Fletcher has done for her. Meanwhile, Olive and Paisley team up for a psychology experiment to place a weak person in the position of authority, so they have Cameron as their subject and make him believe he is the hall monitor, but he drives Olive crazy. It turns out that Cameron and Paisley were partners, their project being how to drive a calm person, Olive, to the brink of madness.
38	13	"mutANT farm 2"	Rich Correll	Stephen Engel & Mark Jordan Legan	October 5, 2012	210	2.94
Mutant Chyna develops a crush on human boy, Holland (Austin North), as does Lexi. When they go on a date, Fletcher and Lexi sabotage their night. Meanwhile, Olive clones herself in order to multi-task. Trouble ensues when one of the clones duplicates itself multiple times and soon, there are Olive clones roaming the school, causing trouble. Guest star: Austin North as Holland Absent: Carlon Jeffery as Cameron Parks Note: This is a sequel to "mutANT farm".
39	14	"detective agANTcy"	Leonard R. Garner Jr.	Stephen Engel & Mark Jordan Legan	October 26, 2012	204	2.15
Chyna accidentally convinces her father, Darryl, to quit his job after he tells her much he hates it. Darryl tries finding other suitable jobs, but it is no use. Chyna does not like seeing him depressed, so after she witnesses him track down the remote control very cleverly, she tells him to work as a private investigator. Meanwhile, Lexi is horrified when she realizes that she and Paisley have the same amount of friends on Wolf Pack, a popular social network. After finding out that Cameron just signed up to Wolf Pack, they try to compete over whose friend request he should accept first in order to obtain more friends.
40	15	"scavANTger hunt"	Rich Correll	Mark Jordan Legan & Stephen Engel	November 2, 2012	203	2.69
Webster High is completely deserted due to the teachers and most of the students getting food poisoning from the cafeteria. The ANTs, Lexi, Paisley, and Cameron are the only ones at school, and instead of attending class, Principal Skidmore sends them on an educational scavenger hunt around San Francisco. After Chyna and Lexi are chosen as team captains, they pick their teams, and head off. Now, both teams compete to see who comes out victorious. Special guest stars: R2-D2, C-3PO
41	16	"chANTs of a lifetime"	Rich Correll	Dan Signer & Jeny Quine	November 23, 2012	219–220	2.41
Chyna is asked to join her favorite band, Trifecta (made up of members Syerra and Laurin), after their lead vocalist, Darlene, gets incredibly ill. The next day, Chyna is treated like a superstar. Sierra and Lauryn show up in disguise and tell Chyna that Darlene decided to quit for good, and they want Chyna to replace her for a year-long tour. Chyna happily agrees, much to Olive and Fletcher's dismay. With Chyna gone, Lexi decides to put on a school musical where she will finally be the star. Furthermore, the A.N.T. Program is being invaded by big kids because Olive and Fletcher are completely helpless without Chyna. Later on, it is revealed that Darlene has been sabotaging Trifecta because Syerra and Laurin fired her for being way too passive-aggressive. Darlene plans to roast them on a lighthouse for revenge, but her plan backfires when she falls out of the lighthouse. In the end, Chyna admits that she misses her friends and family, so she decides to go back to San Francisco. Guest stars: Sierra McClain as Syerra, Lauryn McClain as Laurin
42	17	"early retiremANT"	Rich Correll	Jeff Hodsden & Tim Pollock	January 11, 2013	216	3.03
Chyna and the rest of the ANTs have had enough with Principal Skidmore due to her selfishness and cheapness, so Chyna comes up with an elaborate scheme and convinces her to retire. After Skidmore leaves, Chyna's grandmother, Gladys (Vernee Watson-Johnson), takes over. Chyna could not be happier, but when Grandma Gladys goes extremely overboard, Chyna tries to get Skidmore back. Meanwhile, Skidmore is annoyed because Olive, thinking that retirement is fun and wants to do so as well, will not let her enjoy her retirement in peace. At the end, Chyna gets Miss Skidmore back.
43	18	"influANTces"	Adam Weissman	Vincent Brown	February 1, 2013	217	3.31
Chyna is having trouble with her Black History Month project. As she struggles to write a song for her presentation, she decides to lock herself in a recording booth until she comes up with a great song. After accidentally falling asleep, Chyna takes a dream journey back in time where she becomes famous African American music icons from the past: Ella Fitzgerald, Aretha Franklin, and Janet Jackson. Using her dream as inspiration, Chyna writes a new version of "Exceptional" with lyrics that pay tribute to the great women who came before her. Meanwhile, when Olive makes a memory quilt for her project, she records many embarrassing things about Fletcher.
44	19	"idANTity crisis"	Stephen Engel	Tim Pollock & Jeff Hodsden	April 5, 2013	221	3.10
Chyna discovers that Principal Skidmore put the ANTs' personalities in frozen yogurt cups, turning their bodies into mindless drones. Chyna tries to rescue them by eating every cup of frozen yogurt, which allows the ANTs to enter her brain. When Skidmore tries to put Chyna's personality in a cup, she accidentally swaps bodies with her frozen yogurt machine. In the end, it all reveals to be a story Chyna was telling her fellow A.N.Ts. Meanwhile, Lexi is struggling to sleep due to a reocurring nightmare about her kissing Cameron.
45	20	"restaurANTeur"	Victor Gonzalez	Kat Lombard & Amanda Steinhoff	April 26, 2013	218	2.14
Olive meets Graham, a cooking prodigy who works at Hippo's restaurant. Chyna and Fletcher go to check him out and discover that he is extremely bad tempered. Meanwhile, Lexi wants to have singing waitresses at Hippo's restaurant but Hippo has other forms of entertainment in mind. Absent: Carlon Jeffery as Cameron Parks

=== Season 3 (2013–14) ===
On October 2, 2012, Disney Channel officially renewed A.N.T. Farm for a third season. This season premiered on May 31, 2013.

- Angus Chestnut (Aedin Mincks) joins the main cast.
- Cameron Parks (Carlon Jeffery) is no longer part of the main cast. Webster High School marks its final showing in the one-hour season premiere "trANTsferred". Z-Tech Prodigy School took over as the season's new setting. This was the final season of the show, as confirmed by star China Anne McClain on her Twitter account on December 27, 2013.

No. overall	No. in season	Title	Directed by	Written by	Original release date	Prod. code	U.S. viewers (millions)
46	1	"trANTsferred"	Rich Correll	Dan Signer	May 31, 2013	301–302	2.84
Zoltan Grundy discovers the ANT farm after Angus breaks into his security system. He builds an ANT boarding school where everyone has to audition to get in after Skidmore pretends she cannot afford a good ANT farm. However, only Olive, Fletcher and Angus get in because Zoltan had chosen another music prodigy whom everyone believes is Lexi. She throws a party to celebrate the new school, but Angus and the others prefer studying. Meanwhile, Olive and Fletcher try to help Chyna find the music room so she can record a song to prove to Zoltan that she belongs there. In the end, Chyna is accepted into the school and it is also revealed that Lexi is not a music prodigy but a math prodigy since, when she finished her performance for her audition, she took out her Z-phone Classic and explained mathematically to Zoltan why she did not get the Z-phone 2 which amazes Zoltan. Notes: This is the one-hour season premiere. This is the first episode to feature the season's new opening title sequence. This one-hour episode marks the final showing of Webster High School as the show's setting; Z-Tech Prodigy School becomes the new setting for this season.
47	2	"independANTs"	Rich Correll	Stephen Engel	June 7, 2013	303	3.49
Chyna and the ANTs delight in being free from the supervision of their parents. When Zoltan announces that there are no rules, Olive begins to parent the ANTs with her own rules. Chyna and Fletcher do not agree, and decide to see if they can live without rules. When they begin to see how horrible messy life is, they switch to a new plan by making up a person known as Dorian Bannister who is banning the things Olive loves, such as flower pants or interesting factoids. Zoltan finds out and fires a real Dorian Bannister, until Chyna and Fletcher confess. Meanwhile, Lexi distracts Zoltan with the teenage lifestyle, but ends up getting a cheaper deal with Hashimoto Soda. Guest star: Tom Choi as Mr. Hashimoto
48	3	"animal husbANTry"	Rich Correll	Vincent Brown	June 28, 2013	306	3.34
Chyna agrees to help watch zoology ANT Seth's animals while he is out of town. She soon gains a friendship with his chicken since they have so much in common, but unfortunately she has to feed it to Seth's alligator. Instead, Fletcher feeds it Seth's duck and later learns that it had been taught to speak. They try to teach another one before Seth comes back. Special guest star: Chris Rock as himself, Allie DeBerry as Paisley Houndstooth Absent: Aedin Mincks as Angus Chestnut
49	4	"secret agANT"	Adam Weissman	Jeff Hodsden & Tim Pollock	July 12, 2013	304	2.69
Chyna and Lexi both compete for the new kid in school, sabotaging each other's attempt to date him. In the end, Olive tricks both of them so that she can go out with him. Meanwhile, Angus tries to help Fletcher in an attempt to get Chyna to date him by dating Kennedy. Fletcher begins dating Kennedy, but Chyna does not catch on to the plan. Guest stars: Piper Curda as Kennedy, Ben Winchell as Dixon
50	5	"past, presANT, and future"	Rich Correll	Jeny Quine	July 26, 2013	307	2.96
Young Zoltan arrives with a time machine and falls in love with Chyna, but he refuses to go back to 1986 without her. So Chyna decides to go with him to the dance in 1986. After the dance, Chyna tries to go back to the future but the time machine breaks and Chyna is trapped in the 1980s. In 2013, Chyna is middle-aged and volunteers to return to 1986 so that she can destroy the time machine and save young Chyna from being trapped. When she accomplishes this, a young Chyna and an elderly Chyna appear. Meanwhile, Lexi tries to build a time machine that Angus bought to return to the 5th grade to correct an ugly picture of herself, but it is actually a home entertainment system that Angus is too lazy to set up himself (though it inexplicably sends him back to Lexi in the 5th grade, becoming the cause of her ugly picture). It is revealed that it was all part of Chyna's dream.
51	6	"angus' first movemANT"	Adam Weissman	Mark Jordan Legan	August 2, 2013	305	2.77
Zoltan asks Angus (instead of Chyna) to write a jingle for the new Z-Phone commercial; she becomes jealous. Zoltan only asked Angus because of his strange sneeze. Meanwhile, after Olive has finished reading the entire library and internet, Fletcher gives her a brain teaser which she cannot solve.
52	7	"unforeseen circumstANTs"	Rich Correll	Stephen Engel	August 9, 2013	308	3.02
Chyna cannot stand that Kennedy does not like her, so she helps Kennedy plan a party for Fletcher. Meanwhile, Olive needs help with math.
53	8	"pANTs on fire"	Rich Correll	Vincent Brown	August 23, 2013	312	2.83
Chyna accidentally ingests Dixon's truth serum that forces her to always tell the truth. She tries to figure out a way to stop telling the truth, but when she drinks a lie potion, she cannot stop telling lies. When Zoltan asks Chyna if she likes the new school and she lies, telling him she hates it, he expels her. In the end, Zoltan lets Chyna stay after Olive explains her situation and feeds him the lie potion. Meanwhile, Angus meets a royal family and Lexi helps him prepare. Guest star: Ben Winchell as Dixon Note: This episode aired on September 19, 2013 in the UK and Ireland
54	9	"product misplacemANT"	Adam Weissman	Jeny Quine	September 20, 2013	309	2.61
Zoltan give the ANTs the prototype of the new Z-phone 4, but when Chyna leaves her phone at a bar during a karaoke championship, Mr. Hashimoto finds it and steals it. Meanwhile, Lexi tries to find a boyfriend and chooses Seth, who is a fan of a comic called Garcon. When Lexi tries to stop him from being a Garcon fan, she reads the comic and gets addicted to it. Guest star: Tom Choi as Mr. Hashimoto Absent: Aedin Mincks as Angus Chestnut
55	10	"uncanny resemblANTs"	Jon Rosenbaum	Cindy Fang	September 27, 2013	315	2.36
Zoltan Grundy tells Chyna that Madame Goo Goo is there to mentor her and Chyna is thrilled. After Chyna plays a song for her and she dislikes it, Chyna finds out Zoltan was lying about Madame Goo Goo being her mentor and discovers that Madame Goo Goo will be performing in his fundraiser to help kids go to camps. Chyna's duty is to 'babysit' her and make sure that she writes the song she will be singing. But Madame Goo Goo refuses to write it and goes to a magic store to 'inspire' herself. She goes to try on a magic cabinet and appears to have vanished. Chyna eggs Winter to pretend to be Madame Goo Goo so she will not get in trouble, but right before the performance, the real Madame Goo Goo shows up. She and Winter fight and Fletcher ends up performing in his girl jacket. Meanwhile, Lexi gets jealous about Chyna being with Madame Goo Goo, as Zoltan predicted, so he brings in a mathematician that Olive is crazy for. After Lexi discovers that beauty is a part of math, she tries to find out her beauty score, which is a 3.6. The mathematician shows what she would look like with a perfect beauty score, and it coincidentally looks like Olive. Also, at the end, Zoltan reveals that the "kids" are baby goats (also called kids) living in cramped apartments. Absent: Aedin Mincks as Angus Chestnut
56	11	"mutANT farm 3.0"	Rich Correll	Tim Pollock & Jeff Hodsden	October 4, 2013	311	2.96
The mutANTs arrive at a new school for mutants, but then find it's a prison owned by their version of Winter. While trying to escape they open a portal to our universe, where they meet human versions of themselves. After realizing Winter is not going to give up looking for them, they decide to trick the humans into taking their place.
57	12	"feature presANTation"	Adam Weissman	Amanda Steinhoff & Kat Lombard	October 18, 2013	313	2.67
Cameron shows up at Z-Tech and tells Chyna about his dream to join film school. He wants to film a horror movie at Z-Tech Prodigy School but when Chyna asks Zoltan for permission, he refuses. Chyna tells Cameron that he can start filming and tricks Zoltan into thinking that the school is haunted, making him an unknowing addition to the movie's cast. Meanwhile, Fletcher finds ways to stop Angus from having nightmares when he sleeps. Special guest star: Carlon Jeffery as Cameron Parks
58	13	"finANTial crisis"	Eric Dean Seaton	Jeff Hodsden & Tim Pollock	November 15, 2013	314	2.39
In Z Tech, the Z-Phone 5 starts blowing up and Zoltan is in financial ruins. He sells his company to an unknown business which they find out is Hashimoto's company. He then takes over Z-Tech and turns it into H-Tech. He makes the ANTs pay him to go to school, turns it into a hotel and make them work there. He makes Olive becomes a concierge, Kennedy at the front desk, Zoltan the bell hop, Chyna a giant mop, Fletcher a wet floor sign, Lexi and Angus at the spa and Winter the Vice President of finance. Hashimoto makes the ANTs sleep in sleeping tubes when he makes their rooms guestrooms. Chyna then tries to talk to him about the sleeping tubes when she secretly hears his conversation on the phone about someone working an inside job blowing up the Z-Phone 5. He never mentions the name so she, Olive, Lexi, Angus and Fletcher try to find out who it is. They come to a conclusion that it is Winter when thinking about who would gain the most in taking down Z-tech but cannot prove it. At the end, Chyna and Angus come up with a scheme to expose the culprit and Kennedy then says it was her. She explains that she is forced to do it because her real name is Kumiko Hashimoto, Mr. Hashimoto's daughter, but when she first went to the school, she ended up loving it and all the ANTs and she is not really a debate prodigy. Zoltan then takes back the prodigies school. Guest stars: Tom Choi as Mr. Hashimoto, Piper Curda as Kennedy/Kumiko
59	14	"silANT night"	Adam Weissman	Mark Jordan Legan	December 6, 2013	310	3.10
Grundy tries to surprise the ANTs by dressing up as Santa Claus, but things take a turn when the backup computer (a holographic version of Grundy) locks the kids in the school. Desperate to get home for the holidays, the kids will do anything to break out. When Hologram Grundy has walls enclosing on Chyna, Olive, Fletcher, Angus, and Seth they share the true meaning of Christmas. Meanwhile, Lexi is nominated as ice princess in the Christmas parade, but is unable to show up because of Hologram Grundy's lockdown. Guest star: Michael Weisman as Seth
60	15	"unwANTed"	Jon Rosenbaum	Stephen Engel & Mark Jordan Legan	January 24, 2014	316	2.69
Sick and tired of being the third wheel around her best friend's relationship with her boyfriend, Chyna sends Dixon away in order to spend sometime with Olive. However, after Dixion returns, he dumps Olive for another girl (Emily Robinson), which forces Chyna to pick up the pieces. Meanwhile, Lexi tricks Angus and Fletcher into hiding in her closet by making them believe they are fugitives for crashing into a book store with a driverless car, which is actually a video game, so that she can use their room to store her clothes. At the end, Fletcher meets Olive and consoles her. They lean in and Fletcher kisses Olive. Also, Chyna confesses to Olive about sending Dixon away and was the reason why he broke up with her. However, much to Chyna surprises, Olive isn't mad at her and forgives her. Guest star: Emily Robinson as Oksana
61	16	"meANT to be?"	Phill Lewis	Jeny Quine & Vincent Brown	February 28, 2014	317	2.49
Olive and Fletcher start dating, but keep it a secret from Chyna by pretending to dislike each other as usual. Olive then later reveals it, after Chyna tries to get Fletcher and Olive to get along, which shocks both Chyna and Angus. Chyna is excited about their relationship, while Angus is jealous. He tells Fletcher that he is going after Chyna now, but Fletcher is no longer interested in her. Olive is not convinced that he is, so she had Chyna dress up like her and say 'Interesting Factoids' to Fletcher, but she ends up realizing he really is over Chyna. Lexi then tells Fletcher that Olive made Chyna flirt with him to test him, so Fletcher gets back at Olive by having her dress up like Chyna. Meanwhile, Lexi is discouraged that there is no clubs at the school that she enjoys, so she turns the Dating Club (actually a club about carbon dating) into a Cheerleading Squad. After flipping out on her squad, she gets sentenced to an anger management class. In the end, Chyna helps Olive and Fletcher recognize that they only tested each other because they like each other so much, so they get mad at Chyna for going along with it instead. Angus joins Lexi in her anger management class and he angrily explains that while Olive will not go out with him, Chyna will not either. He then smashes a lamp on the pile of already-smashed lamps. Lexi is happy, exclaiming, "Why didn't anyone tell me about this club? This club is awesome!" Guest stars: Piper Curda as Kennedy/Kumiko Hashimoto, Michael Weisman as Seth
62	17	"the new york experiANTs"	Stephen Engel	Dan Signer	March 21, 2014	318	1.87
Everyone in Z-Tech accompanies Zoltan to the grand opening of the new flagship Z-Store in New York City. While there, Chyna meets Hudson (Roshon Fegan), a street performer in New York City and he puts on a tough guy persona in order to impress Chyna. Meanwhile, Fletcher gets a big opportunity to move to New York as an artist in residence at an art museum. Wanting to stay in California, and to stay with Olive, Fletcher declines, but Olive "breaks up" with him so he would accept. As Fletcher says his goodbyes to Chyna, Angus, and Zoltan, Olive reveals (hiding in a garbage can) that she broke up with him so he would take the fellowship. Angus, Chyna, and Olive return to the A.N.T. Farm and Hudson joins the A.N.T. program as a rap prodigy. Guest stars: Roshon Fegan as Hudson and Dominic Burgess as Zoltan Grundy
