= Calling All the Monsters =

2011 single by China Anne McClain

Single by China Anne McClain

from the album A.N.T. Farm
- Released: September 20, 2011
- Genre: Dance-pop; electropop
- Length: 3:25
- Label: Walt Disney
- Songwriters: Niclas Molinder, Joacim Persson, Johan Alkenäs, Charlie Mason
- Producer: Twin

China Anne McClain singles chronology
"Dynamite" (2011)	"Calling All the Monsters" (2011)	"What's My Name" (2017)

"Calling All the Monsters" is a song performed by American actress and singer China Anne McClain. It was produced by Niclas Molinder and Joacim Persson, who also co-wrote the song with Johan Alkenäs and Charlie Mason, for the A.N.T. Farm soundtrack (2011). It was released as the album's second single on September 20, 2011, through Walt Disney Records. Musically, the song is prominent dance-pop and electropop that runs through a club oriented beat, and the lyrics are Halloween-themed, speaking of dancing with monsters.

The song was met with generally positive reviews from critics, with the majority of them praising its playful nature and dance oriented sound. It has topped the Radio Disney Top 30 Countdown. The song earned 25,000 downloads within its first week of release.

In 2021, the song was re-recorded by McClain with her sisters, under their band name, Thriii. The song features their brother, Gabriel McClain who is known by his stage name, Messenger. The song was featured in the Disney Channel Original Movie, Under Wraps.

== Background ==
"Calling All the Monsters" is the second single released from the soundtrack A.N.T. Farm (2011), for the television series of the same name on Disney Channel. It was first heard on the series's first-season Halloween-themed episode, "mutANT farm", which premiered on October 7, 2011, in North America, more than two weeks after the single's release. The song was performed by McClain in the episode. The episode featured an alternate universe where the A.N.T.s were monsters and controlled the school over the humans. After learning of the rule against mutants attending the Halloween dance, which they helped set up, Chyna Parks (McClain), fantasized as a Medusa, concocts a potion that changes the A.N.T.s into human form. Parks later gets up on the stage and performs the song as everyone in the audience is dancing, with the newly transformed A.N.T.s reversed backed to their ghoulish form.

The song was also used in "Beam It Up", the second-season Halloween-themed episode of the Disney Channel series Shake It Up (October 9, 2011). Gabby Duran & the Unsittables star Kylie Cantrall performed the song on the Halloween-themed episode "You Decide LIVE!" of the series Just Roll with It on October 4, 2019.

== Composition ==
"Calling All the Monsters" is predominantly a dance-pop and electropop song that runs through a club beat, at 142 BPM. It has been noted to be a modern version of Michael Jackson's 1982 song "Thriller". The sound of "Calling All the Monsters" received comparisons to the musical stylings of Jackson and singer Britney Spears. The theme of this song centers around magic and fantasy while the lyrics pertain to dancing with characters of a frightful nature.

== Reception ==
Jessica Dawson of Commonsensemedia, the website that rates music for parents approval for children's listening, rated the song three out of five stars, praising its club-friendly nature, further commenting that "McClain does a good job channeling the King of Pop in her own version of a dance-off with mummies and zombies, but she does it with a smile and a pink-sequined top. "Calling All the Monsters" is an upbeat, contagious club beat that will have you and your kids ready to kick it on the dance floor on Halloween night. Kids will love it for any night of the year, of course, but it's sure to be a hit when the little vampires and witches come out in October."

"Calling All the Monsters" debut on the Billboard Hot 100 at number 100, moving 25,000 digital downloads during the week ending October 9, 2011. The release of the soundtrack prompted a sales increase for the song, reappearing on the chart at number eighty-six. The song earned 25,000 downloads within its first week of release.

== Music video ==
The music video was released on September 21, 2011. China Anne McClain's older sisters, Lauryn Alisa McClain and Sierra Aylina McClain, guest star in the music video. The three sisters are in costume and looking for the location of a Halloween party. They are standing in front of a house where China thinks the party is happening. She goes inside despite the protests of her sisters. China takes her costume hood off and sees a suit of armor covered in spider webs that comes to life and they dance. She comes to the second floor and dances with more monsters, including a mummy, a werewolf and a Frankenstein's monster. A picture of a man in a frame moves and dances. She moves to the third floor, where a bunch of monsters dance with her in a giant ballroom. In the end, she comes out with her hood, saying to her sisters that there wasn't anything in there.

The video was inspired by the music videos "Thriller" (1983), by Michael Jackson, and "Superstition" (2003), by Raven-Symoné.

== Chart performance ==
Chart (2011)	Peak position
Canada (Canadian Hot 100)	89
UK Singles (Official Charts Company)	119
US Billboard Hot 100	86
US Heatseekers Songs (Billboard)	8
US Kid Digital Songs (Billboard)	1

== Certifications ==
Certifications for "Calling all the Monsters"
Region	Certification	Certified units/sales
United States (RIAA)	Platinum	1,000,000^{‡}
^{‡} Sales+streaming figures based on certification alone.
