= Jeremy Jackson (disambiguation) =

Jeremy Jackson (born 1980) is an American actor and singer.

Jeremy Jackson may also refer to:

- Jeremy Jackson (scientist) (born 1942), American marine ecologist
- Jeremy Jackson (author), American author
- Jeremy Jackson (fighter) (born 1982), American mixed martial arts fighter
- Jeremy Kent Jackson, American actor

== See also ==
- Jerry Jackson (disambiguation)
