= Disney Channel Play It Loud =

Compilation album by Disney Channel stars
- Released: February 11, 2014
- Recorded: 2012–2014
- Genre: Pop; dance-pop; teen pop
- Label: Walt Disney
- Producer: Matthew Gerrard; Bárður Háberg

Disney Channel stars chronology
Holidays Unwrapped (2013)	Disney Channel Play It Loud (2014)	Access All Areas: Disney Channel (2015)

Disney Channel Play It Loud is a compilation album from Walt Disney Records. It was released on February 11, 2014, in the United States and on 25 August 2014 in Europe.

This album includes works by musical artists associated with the Disney Channel, such as Ross Lynch, Debby Ryan, Zendaya, China Anne McClain, Dove Cameron, Laura Marano, Bella Thorne, Roshon Fegan, Luke Benward, Raini Rodriguez, Aakash Yadav and Calum Worthy.

== Track listing ==
Disney Channel Play It Loud track listing
No.	Title	Writer(s)	Performer(s)	Length
1.	"Cloud 9" (from Cloud 9)	Dan Book; Alexei Misoul	Dove Cameron and Luke Benward	3:30
2.	"Better in Stereo" (Liv and Maddie Theme Song)	Bárður Háberg, Óli Jógvansson, Paula Winger and Molly Kaye	Dove Cameron	2:34
3.	"You Can Come to Me" (from Austin & Ally)	Matthew Tishler and Amy Powers	Ross Lynch and Laura Marano	3:42
4.	"Timeless" (from Austin & Ally)	Niclas Molinder, Joacim Persson, Johan Alkenas, Cristi Vaughan Kara DioGuardi	Ross Lynch	3:39
5.	"Best Year" (from Jessie)	Lindsey Ray, John Fields and Debby Ryan	Debby Ryan	3:14
6.	"The Me That You Don't See" (from Austin & Ally)	Jamie Houston and James Dean Hicks	Laura Marano	2:56
7.	"On Top of the World" (from Liv and Maddie)	Alexander Grant, Daniel Reynolds, Daniel Sermon and Benjamin McKee	Dove Cameron	3:05
8.	"Remember Me" (from Shake It Up)	Antonina Armato and Tim James	Zendaya	3:03
9.	"Ring Ring (Hey Girls)" (from Shake It Up)	Charity Daw, Sam Hollander and Josh Edmondson	Bella Thorne	2:46
10.	"Let's Get Tricky" (from Shake It Up)	Joseph Smart, Sergio Cabral, Julian Davis, Sarai Howard, Yusef Jackson, Michael Klein, Susan Paroff and Ali Dee	Bella Thorne and Roshon Fegan	2:30
11.	"I Got That Rock and Roll" (from Austin & Ally)	Ben Charles and Matthew Tishler	Ross Lynch	2:37
12.	"DNA" (from A.N.T. Farm)	Antonina Armato, Tim James, Adam Schmalholz, Thomas Sturges and Jon Vella	China Anne McClain	2:42
13.	"Dancin' by Myself" (from A.N.T. Farm)	Sam Hollander, Stephen Ruchelman and Shelly Peiken	China Anne McClain	2:55
14.	"Austin & Ally Glee Club Mash Up"	Joleen Belee, Mike McGarity, Julia Michaels, Anthony Anderson, Steve Smith, Mitch Allan, Jason Evigan, Windy Wagner, Michael Smidi Smith, Spencer Lee, Ben Charles, Matthew Tishler, Aris Archontis, Chen Neerman, Jeannie Lurie, Laura Marano, Dan Book, Alexei Misoul, Jamie Houston, Robyn Newman	Ross Lynch, Laura Marano, Calum Worthy and Raini Rodriguez	2:49

Brazil exclusive bonus track
No.	Title	Recording Artist(s)	Length
15.	"Livin' Out Loud" (from Que Talento!)	College 11	2:38

UK exclusive bonus tracks
No.	Title	Recording artist(s)	Length
15.	"Cruisin' for a Bruisin" (from Teen Beach Movie)	Grace Phipps, Jason Evigan and Ross Lynch	3:15
16.	"Falling for Ya" (from Teen Beach Movie)	Grace Phipps	3:12
17.	"In My Own World" (from Violetta)	Martina Stoessel	3:32
18.	"Take on the World" (Theme Song from Girl Meets World)	Rowan Blanchard and Sabrina Carpenter	3:12
19.	"Time of Our Lives" (Theme Song from I Didn't Do It)	Olivia Holt	2:29
20.	"Count Me In" (from Liv and Maddie)	Dove Cameron	2:57
21.	"It's My Friday" (Disney Channel Friday Theme Song)	Bojanic, Cooke, Emanuel, Fingers, Hooper and Ray Fingers	2:00
22.	"Too Much" (from Zapped)	Zendaya	3:07

== Charts ==
Chart (2014)	Peak position
U.S. Billboard 200	92
U.S. Billboard Kid Albums	2
