= Jerome Jackson =

Jerome Jackson may refer to:

- Jerome Jackson (producer) (1898–1940), American film producer and script writer
- J. J. Jackson (singer) (Jerome Louis Jackson, born 1942), American singer, songwriter and arranger

== See also ==
- Jerry Jackson (disambiguation)
