= The Last Thing Mary Saw =

- Directed by: Edoardo Vitaletti
- Written by: Edoardo Vitaletti
- Produced by: Isen Robbins; Aimee Schoof; Harrison Allen; Madeleine Schumacher; Stephen Tedeschi
- Starring: Stefanie Scott; Isabelle Fuhrman; Judith Roberts; Rory Culkin
- Cinematography: David Kruta
- Edited by: Matthew C. Hart
- Music by: Keegan DeWitt
- Production companies: Intrinsic Value Films; Arachnid Films; Island View Productions
- Distributed by: Shudder
- Release dates: August 15, 2021 (Fantasia); January 20, 2022 (United States)
- Running time: 89 minutes
- Country: United States
- Language: English

The Last Thing Mary Saw is a 2021 American folk horror film written and directed by Edoardo Vitaletti. Set in 1843, the film follows the youngest daughter of a strict religious family who is under investigation after the mysterious death of her family's ominous matriarch.

== Plot ==
Southold, New York, 1843. Young Mary (Stefanie Scott), blood trickling from behind the blindfold tied around her eyes, is interrogated about the events surrounding the death of her family's matriarch (Judith Roberts). As the story jumps back in time, we witness Mary, raised in a repressively religious household, finding fleeting happiness in the arms of Eleanor (Isabelle Fuhrman), the home’s maid. Her family view the girls’ relationship as an abomination to be dealt with as severely as possible, with the tension only heightened by the arrival of an enigmatic intruder (Rory Culkin) and the revelation of greater forces at work.

== Cast ==
- Stefanie Scott as Mary
- Isabelle Fuhrman as Eleanor
- Judith Roberts as The Matriarch
- Rory Culkin as The Intruder / Rupert
- P.J. Sosko as Theodore
- Carolyn McCormick as Agnes
- Michael Laurence as Randolph
- Elijah Rayman as Matthew
- Stephen Lee Anderson as The Grandfather
- Tommy Buck as Eustace
- Shane Coffey as Eustace's Son
- Dawn McGee as Ann
- Daniel Pearce as The Interrogator

== Production ==
In December 2019, it was announced that Stefanie Scott, Isabelle Fuhrman, Judith Roberts and Rory Culkin had been cast in the film, which was scheduled to shoot in New York that month.

== Release ==
The film had its world premiere at the Fantasia International Film Festival on August 15, 2021. It was released on Shudder on January 20, 2022.

== Reception ==
On the review aggregator website Rotten Tomatoes, 71% of 56 critics' reviews are positive, with an average rating of 6.50/10. The website's consensus reads: "Its restrained approach may frustrate horror fans seeking more visceral thrills, but The Last Thing Mary Saw tells a haunting period tale."

Matt Zoller Seitz of RogerEbert.com gave the film a positive review, writing that the film "has a you-are-there feeling that's unusual in low-budget period pictures", and adding that "it feels like the opening installment in a filmmaking career worth following." Dennis Harvey of Variety also gave the film a positive review, calling it "an arresting period piece", and noting that "Vitaletti merits admiration for a debut feature whose ambitions are off the usual beaten track." Jon Mendelsohn of Comic Book Resources awarded the film three and a half stars out of five and wrote, "The Last Thing Mary Saw may be a slow burn, but its effective performances, eerie atmosphere, and explosive ending make it a must-see horror film."

Matt Donato of Paste Magazine gave the film a negative review and wrote that "The Last Thing Mary Saw feels restrained by its means — unable to emphasize its ultimate payoffs — and beholden to a tiptoe pace that won't ensnare all audiences."
