= Don Creech =

American actor

- Born: New York, U.S.
- Occupation: Actor
- Years active: 1973–present

Don Creech is an American actor who has appeared in many television shows.

== Career ==
He is mainly known for playing Mr. Sweeney, the science teacher in Ned's Declassified School Survival Guide and the snake oil merchant Nigel West Dickens in the 2010 video game Red Dead Redemption.

He played in Barefoot in the Park by Neil Simon, starring Gail Rich.

== Filmography ==
=== Film ===
- Léon (1994) as Stansfield man
- Flirting with Disaster (1996) as a policeman
- Henry Fool (1997) as Owen Feer
- The Book of Life (1998) as Mormon Thug #2
- Three Below Zero (1998) as Mark
- Karma Local (1998) as Balthazar
- 8mm (1999) as Mr. Anderson
- Wirey Spindell (1999) as Mean Teacher
- The Tavern (1999) as Shank
- The Curse (1999) as Mr. Grant
- Wirey Spindell (2000) as a professor
- Ultrachrist! (2003) as God the Father
- The Island (2005) as God-Like Man
- Good Night, and Good Luck (2005) as Colonel Jenkins
- The Curious Case of Benjamin Button (2008) as Prentiss Mayes
- X-Men: First Class (2011) as CIA Agent William Stryker Sr.
- Rampart (2011) as Head Shark Lawyer
- Moments of Clarity (2016) as Ralph

=== Television ===
- The Adventures of Pete and Pete (1995; season 3, episode 9) as Mr. Slurm
- Law & Order:
  - Season 4, Episode 22 (1994) as Nikolai Rostov
  - Season 7, Episode 15 (1997) as Carl Thurston
  - Season 9, Episode 22 (1999) as Tom Smith
- Third Watch (1999; season 1, episode 2) as Reilly
- Law & Order Special Victims Unit (1999; season 1, episode 8) as Atkins
- Ed (2001; season 1, episode 13)
- CSI: Miami (2002; season 1, episode 3) as Captain Bob Mortin
- In Justice (2006; season 1, episode 8) as Fred Lisco
- Ned's Declassified School Survival Guide (2004-2007) as Mr. Sweeney
- How I Met Your Mother (2008; season 3, episode 13) as Old Guy
- Criminal Minds (2009; season 5, episode 2) as Bill Jarvis
- Brooklyn Nine-Nine (2016; season 4, episode 7) as Bill Russo

=== Video games ===
- Red Dead Redemption (2010) – Nigel West Dickens
- Red Dead Redemption: Undead Nightmare (2010) – Nigel West Dickens
- L.A. Noire (2011) – Rufus Dixon
