= A.N.T. Farm (soundtrack) =

2011 soundtrack album by China Anne McClain

Soundtrack album by China Anne McClain
- Released: October 11, 2011
- Recorded: 2011
- Genres: Electropop; pop rock
- Length: 31:39
- Label: Walt Disney Records
- Producers: Ali Dee; John Fields; Michael McClain; Niclas Molinder; Joacim Persson; Toby Gad; Johan Alkenäs; Michael "Smidi" Smith; 1984

Singles from A.N.T. Farm
- 1. "Dynamite" Released: July 26, 2011; 2. "Calling All the Monsters" Released: September 20, 2011

A.N.T. Farm is the soundtrack album for the Disney Channel television series of the same name. It was released on October 11, 2011 by Walt Disney Records. Most of the soundtrack features songs performed in the first season of the series by the lead actress China Anne McClain, as well as new songs performed by cast members Carlon Jeffery and Stefanie Scott, and China Anne and her two sisters, known as the McClain Sisters. The soundtrack was successful, spending five weeks on the Billboard kids chart in 2011. It sold 14,000 copies within the first week of release.

== Overview ==
Most of the songs on the soundtrack are performed by the show's lead actress, China Anne McClain, including the show's theme song, "Exceptional," and covers of Taio Cruz's "Dynamite" and Christina Aguilera's "Beautiful". "Dynamite" and McClain's original song, "Calling All the Monsters," were released as singles from the soundtrack. "Calling All the Monsters" was the first single to chart, peaking at number 86 on America and charting in two more countries.

There are also two songs by cast member Carlon Jeffery: a kid-friendly cover of DJ Jazzy Jeff & the Fresh Prince's "Summertime" and an original song, "Pose," with fellow cast member Stefanie Scott. There are two songs performed by McClain and her sisters Lauryn and Sierra, together known as the McClain Sisters. All of the songs by McClain are solely featured in the first season of the series whereas the other songs did were not featured in the series.

== Critical reception ==
Professional ratings
Review scores
Source	Rating
Allmusic	3/5 stars

James Christopher Monger of Allmusic gave the album three out of five stars, referring to the theme song as "catchy".

== Commercial performance ==
The soundtrack peaked at number 29 on the US Billboard 200. It has also peaked at number 2 on the US Top Soundtracks and topped the US Kid Albums chart.

== Other uses ==
So far, two songs from the soundtrack have been used in other Disney Channel works besides A.N.T. Farm: "Calling All the Monsters" was used in "Beam It Up", a season 2 Halloween episode of the series Shake It Up. "Pose" by Stefanie Scott and Carlon Jeffery was featured in the Disney Channel Original Movie Frenemies (2012), which Scott starred in.

== Track listing ==
No.	Title	Writer(s)	Length
1.	"Exceptional" (China Anne McClain)	Toby Gad, Lindy Robbins, McClain Sisters	2:55
2.	"Dynamite" (China Anne McClain)	Benjamin Levin, Taio Cruz, Max Martin, Bonnie McKee, Lukasz Gottwald	2:41
3.	"Calling All the Monsters" (China Anne McClain)	China Anne McClain, Niclas Molinder, Joacim Persson, Johan Alkenäs, Charlie Mason	3:26
4.	"Unstoppable" (China Anne McClain)	China Anne McClain, Niclas Molinder, Joacim Persson, Johan Alkenas, Charlie Mason	3:22
5.	"Beautiful" (China Anne McClain)	Linda Perry	3:18
6.	"My Crush" (China Anne McClain)	Kara DioGuardi, Wes Jones, Mathew Sherman, Cory Thomas	3:24
7.	"Pose" (Stefanie Scott and Carlon Jeffery)	Windy Wagner, Michael Dennis Smith, Spencer Lee	3:26
8.	"Summertime" (Carlon Jeffery)	Jeffrey A. Townes, Will Smith, Lamar Hula Mahone, Craig Simpkins, Robert Bell, Ronald Bell, George Brown, Robert Mickens, Charles Smith, Alton Taylor, Dennis Thomas, Richard Westfield	4:13
9.	"Perfect Mistake" (McClain Sisters)	Sierra A. McClain, Michael J. McClain	3:25
10.	"Electronic Apology" (McClain Sisters)	Sierra A. McClain, Michael J. McClain	3:23

International bonus track
No.	Title	Writer(s)	Length
11.	"Unstoppable" (Dave Audé Radio Mix)	China Anne McClain, Niclas Molinder, Joacim Persson, Johan Alkenas, Charlie Mason	3:54

== Personnel ==
Credits for A.N.T. Farm adapted from Allmusic

- 1984- mixing, producer
- Ali Dee- mixing, producer
- Johan Alkenäs- composer, producer
- Robert Bell- composer
- Ronald Bell- composer
- George Brown- composer
- Taio Cruz- composer
- Kara DioGuardi- composer
- John Fields- mixing, producer
- Toby Gad- composer, mixing, producer
- Steve Gerdes- art direction
- Lukasz Gottwald- composer
- Paul David Hager- mixing
- Wes Jones- composer
- Spencer Lee- composer
- Benjamin Levin- composer
- Jon Lind- A&R
- Lamar Mahone- composer
- Stephen Marcussen- mastering
- Dani Markman- A&R
- Max Martin- composer
- Charlie Mason- composer
- China McClain- composer
- Lauryn McClain -composer, guitar
- Michael McClain- composer, producer, programming
- Sierra McClain- composer, guitar
- Bonnie McKee- composer
- Robert "Spike" Mickens- composer
- Niclas Molinder- composer, producer
- Dave Pensado- mixing
- Linda Perry- composer
- Joacim Persson- composer, producer
- Lindy Robbins- composer
- JD Salbego- additional production
- Mathew Sherman- composer
- Craig Simpkins- composer
- Claydes Smith- composer
- Michael "Smidi" Smith- mixing, producer
- Michael Dennis Smith- composer
- Will Smith- composer
- Steve Sterling- design
- Alton Taylor- composer
- Louie Teran- mastering
- Cory Thomas- composer
- Dennis Thomas- composer
- Steven Vincent- executive in charge of music, soundtrack executive
- Windy Wagner- composer
- Richard Westfield- composer

== Charts ==
Chart (2011–12)	Peak position
Spain Promusicae	98
U.S Billboard 200	29
U.S Kid Albums (Billboard)	1
U.S Top Soundtracks (Billboard)	2
