= Stefanie Scott =

American actress and singer (born 1996)

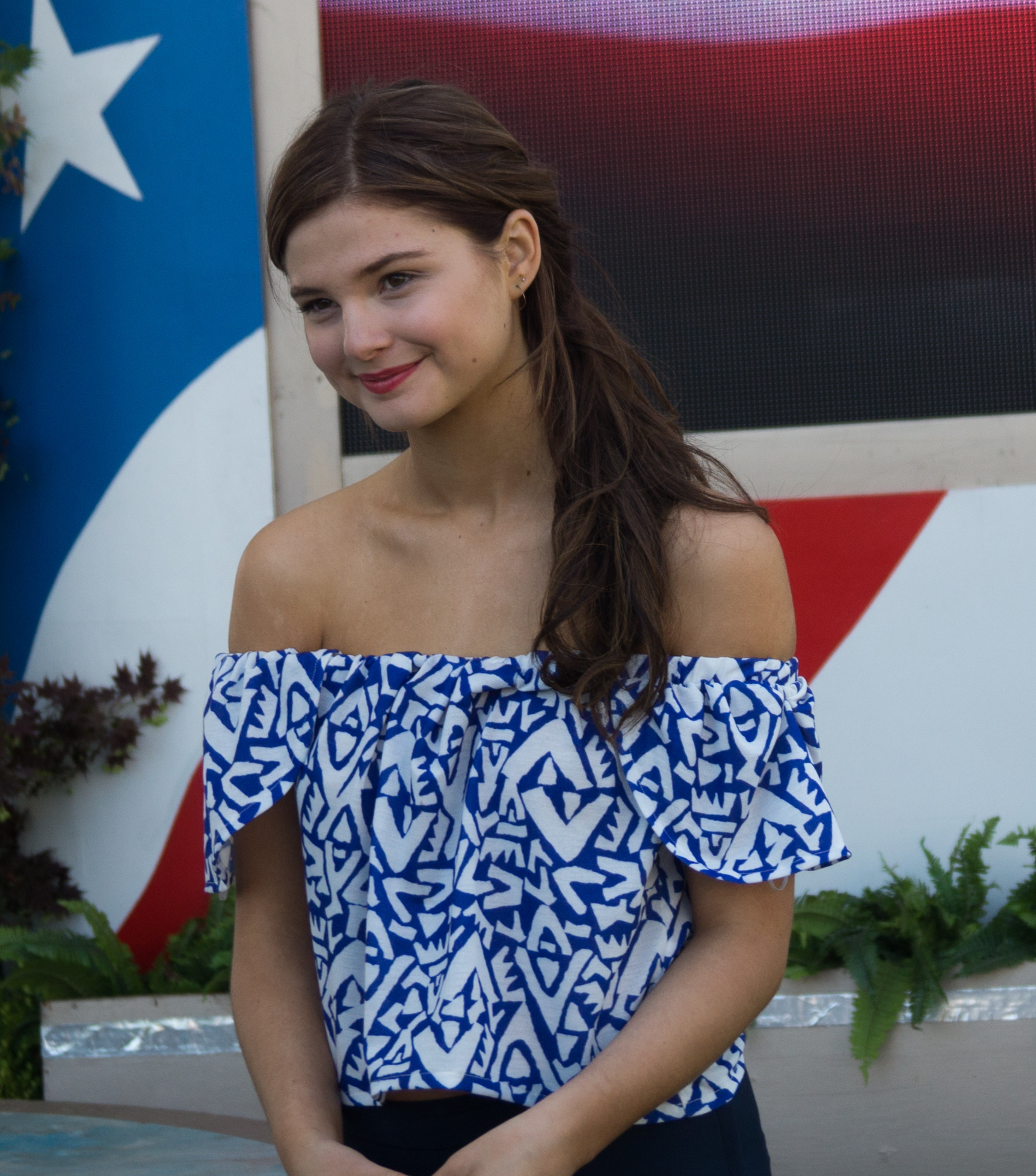
- Scott in 2015
- Born: December 6, 1996 (age 29); Chicago, Illinois, U.S.
- Occupations: Actress; singer
- Years active: 2008–present
- Spouse: Evan Adamson (m. 2024)
- Musical career
- Genre: Pop
- Website: stefaniescott.com

Stefanie Noelle Scott (born December 6, 1996) is an American actress and singer. Scott began acting with the comedy film Beethoven's Big Break (2008), and thereafter released her debut extended play New Girl in Town (2009). This was followed by a supporting role in the romance film Flipped (2010), which won her a Young Artist Award. She played the role of Lexi Reed on Disney Channel's A.N.T. Farm (2011–2014), which won her a second Young Artist Award and introduced her to a wider audience. While on Disney, she recorded a number of Disney Channel promotional singles, which were released between 2008 and 2012.

Scott made her foray into mainstream film and television with a voice role in the animated film Wreck-It Ralph (2012), for which she won a BTVA Award. She then played the leading role of Quinn Brenner in the horror film Insidious: Chapter 3 (2015)—her highest-grossing film—and co-starred in the musical film Jem and the Holograms (2015), for which she additionally contributed to its soundtrack. Her subsequent film roles have consisted of independent features, such as the neo-noir Small Town Crime (2017), the biopic Beautiful Boy (2018), the high-school drama Good Girls Get High (2018). the thriller Mary (2019) and The Girl in the Woods (2021).

== Early life ==
Stefanie Noelle Scott was born on December 6, 1996 in Chicago, Illinois to Diane (née Kipta) and Paul Scott. She has two older brothers. Scott is of English, Irish, Austrian, Czech, Belarusian, and Swedish descent. She lived in Indialantic, Florida and attended Holy Trinity Episcopal Academy, before becoming home schooled in 2010.

== Career ==
=== 2008–2012: Early work and Disney stardom ===
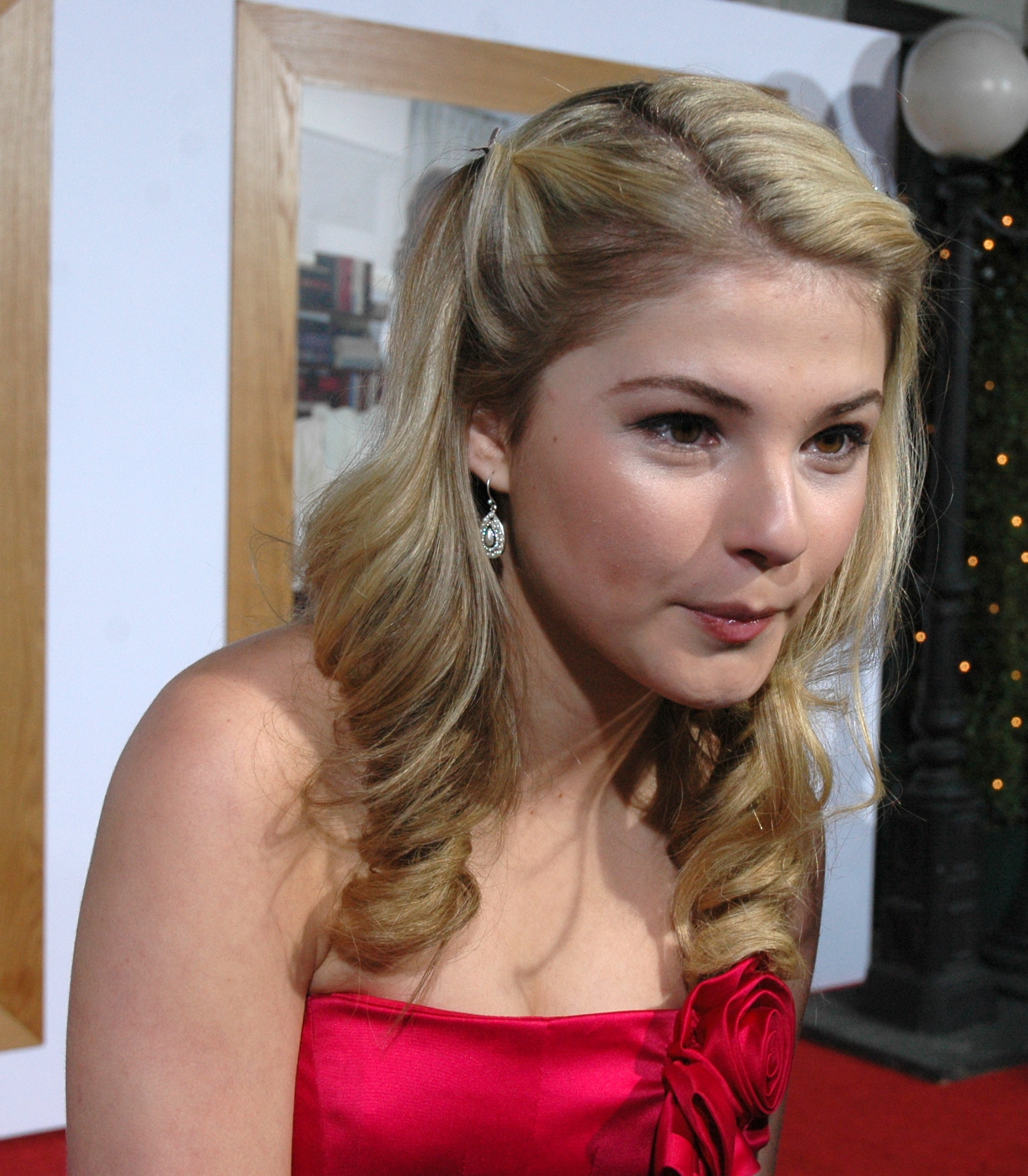
Scott in 2011

Scott was first a California Discovery Girl in the 2009 August/September issue of Discovery Girls magazine. She appeared in the role of Katie in Beethoven's Big Break. She appeared in the feature film Flipped directed by Rob Reiner as well as in the film titled No Strings Attached where she played a young version of the main character.

Scott was the voice of Emma on the Disney animated TV series Special Agent Oso premiering in April 2009 on Disney Channel. Scott had a guest-starring role in the Fox series Sons of Tucson as well as on NBC series Chuck playing the 12-year-old Sarah Walker. Scott released her second song entitled, "Shoulda Woulda Coulda".

In 2011, she starred in the Disney Channel Original Series A.N.T. Farm as one of the main characters, Lexi Reed. She also served as second assistant director in the show's first season. Scott released a song entitled, "The Girl I Used to Know" in the same year. The official music video for the song premiered on October 26, the music video features an appearance by Orlando based band Before You Exit portraying as her band.

=== 2013–present: Mainstream film and television ===
In 2013, Scott was a guest star on the fifteenth season of Law & Order: Special Victims Unit as Clare Wilson. Scott provided the voice of Moppet Girl in Wreck-It Ralph. Scott also guest-starred on the Disney Channel show Jessie, as Maybelle. From 2013, Scott has sponsored girls through Shoeboxes for Haiti, and is a cookie ambassador with the organization Cookies for Kids Cancer.

In 2014, Scott began to film four films, Insidious: Chapter 3 (released in June 2015), Jem and the Holograms, 1 Mile to You, and Caught. Caught was screened at the premiere of the 2015 Los Angeles Film Festival on June 12, 2015. Also in 2015, Scott appeared in Hayley Kiyoko's music video for "Girls Like Girls". In 2015, Scott appeared as the daughter of Pierce Brosnan and Anna Friel, in crime thriller film I.T. (2016), directed by John Moore.

In August 2016, it was announced that Scott would play the lead role in the independent sci-fi feature film At First Light (2018), directed by Jason Stone. In February 2021, Scott appeared as the main character Sara Cody in the Lifetime movie Girl In The Basement, based on the infamous Fritzl kidnapping case. In May 2021, she played the lead as Carrie in the Crypt TV supernatural drama series The Girl in the Woods.

Scott starred alongside Isabelle Fuhrman in the 2021 folk horror film The Last Thing Mary Saw directed by Edoardo Vitaletti.

== Filmography ==
Key
†	Denotes films that have not yet been released

=== Film ===
Year	Title	Role	Notes
2008	Beethoven's Big Break	Katie	
2010	Flipped	Dana Tressler	
2011	No Strings Attached	Young Emma Kurtzman	
2012	Wreck-It Ralph	Moppet Girl (voice)	
2012	Frenemies	Julianne Bryan	Disney Channel Original Movie
2014	Red Zone	Caroline	
2015	Insidious: Chapter 3	Quinn Brenner	
2015	Caught	Allie	
2015	Jem and the Holograms	Kimber Benton	
2016	I.T.	Kaitlyn Regan	
2017	1 Mile to You	Ellie Butterbit	
2017	Small Town Crime	Ivy Oarblocker	
2018	Insidious: The Last Key	Quinn Brenner	
2018	At First Light	Alex Lainey	
2018	Beautiful Boy	Julia	
2018	Spare Room	Hannah	
2018	Good Girls Get High	Danielle	
2019	Mary	Lindsey	
2021	Girl in the Basement	Sarah Cody	
2021	The Last Thing Mary Saw	Mary	
2026	Girls Like Girls	—N/a	As screenwriter
TBA	They Who Walk Among Us †	Isabel "Izzy" Grant	pre-production
TBA	Hell House †	Dawn Ferguson	pre-production

=== Television ===
Year	Title	Role	Notes
2008	Chuck	Young Sarah Walker	Episode: "Chuck Versus the DeLorean"
2009	Special Agent Oso	Emma (voice)	Episode: "Live and Let Ride"
2009	The New Adventures of Old Christine	Britney Burke	Episode: "The Curious Case of Britney B"
2010	Funny in Farsi	Deborah "Debbie" Appleby	Episode: "Pilot"
2010	Sons of Tucson	Molly	Episode: "Kisses and Beads"
2011–2014	A.N.T. Farm	Lexi Reed	Main role
2011	Law & Order: Special Victims Unit	Clare Wilson	2 episodes
2014	Jessie	Maybelle	Episode: "Hoedown Showdown"
2021	Girl in the Basement	Sarah Cody	Television film
2021	The Girl in the Woods	Carrie	Main role
2022	Alaska Daily	Erica Block	Episode: "The Weekend"

=== Podcasts ===
Year	Title	Role	Notes
2023	Academy	Amber	8 episodes

=== Music videos ===
Year	Title	Artist(s)	Role
2011	"Dynamite"	China Anne McClain	Judge
2013	"I Like That"	Before You Exit	Herself
2015	"Girls Like Girls"	Hayley Kiyoko	Coley

== Discography ==
=== Extended plays ===
List of EPs
Title	EP details
New Girl in Town	Release: June 8, 2009; Formats: Digital download; Label: Independent

=== Promotional singles ===
	Year	Album
"Break the Floor"	2008	Non-album single
"Shoulda Woulda Coulda"	2008	New Girl in Town
"The Girl I Used to Know"	2011	Non-album singles
"FYI"	2012	Non-album singles
"Everything Has Changed"(featuring Spencer Sutherland)	2013	Non-album singles
"I Don't Wanna Let You Go"	2014	Non-album singles
"Wherever I May Go" (with Jack Etheridge)	2021	Non-album singles

=== Other appearances ===
Title	Year	Other artist	Album
"Pose"	2012	Carlon Jeffery	A.N.T. Farm
"Youngblood"	2015	Hilary Duff and Aubrey Peeples	Jem and the Holograms
"Hit Me Up"	2015	—N/a	Jem and the Holograms
"We Got Heart"	2015	Aubrey Peeples, Aurora Perrineau and Ryan Guzman	Jem and the Holograms
"Youngblood"	2015	Aubrey Peeples	Jem and the Holograms
"I'm Still Here"	2015	Aubrey Peeples and Aurora Perrineau	Jem and the Holograms

=== Music videos ===
Title	Year	Director	Note
"Girl I Used to Know"	2011	Chris Grieder	
"Everything Has Changed"	2013	Graham Fielder	

== Awards and nominations ==
Award	Year (Note: Year is linked to the article for the specific ceremony when available.)	Category	Work	Result	Ref.
Young Artist Award	2009	Best Performance in a DVD Film	Beethoven's Big Break	Nominated	
Young Artist Award	2009	Best Performance in a TV Series – Guest Starring Young Actress	Chuck	Nominated	
Young Artist Award	2010	Best Performance in a TV Series – Guest Starring Young Actress	The New Adventures of Old Christine	Nominated	
Young Artist Award	2011	Best Performance in a Feature Film – Supporting Young Actress	Flipped	Won	
Young Artist Award	2012	Best Performance in a Feature Film – Supporting Young Actress	No Strings Attached	Nominated	
Young Artist Award	2012	Best Performance in a TV Series – Supporting Young Actress	A.N.T. Farm	Won	
Behind the Voice Actors Awards	2013	Best Vocal Ensemble in a Feature Film	Wreck-It Ralph	Won	
