= Judith Roberts (actress) =

American actress (born 1934)

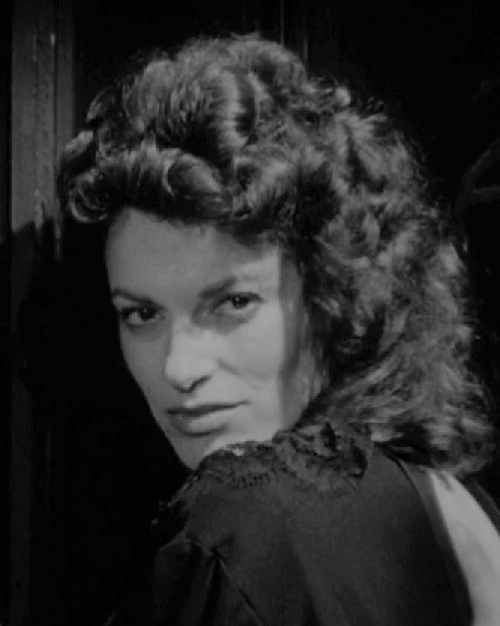
- Roberts in Eraserhead (1977)
- Born: Judith Anna Lebreque; November 30, 1934 (age 91)
- Occupation: Actress
- Years active: 1971–present
- Spouse: Pernell Roberts (m. 1962; div. 1971)

Judith Roberts (born November 30, 1934) is an American actress, who performed in various stage productions and appeared in film and television. She starred in the horror film Eraserhead (1977) by David Lynch and in later age played the main antagonist Mary Shaw in James Wan's supernatural horror film Dead Silence (2007). She also starred in films Fred Won't Move Out (2012), You Were Never Really Here (2017) and The Last Thing Mary Saw (2021). Roberts also played Erica Taslitz, one of "The Golden Girls", in the Netflix comedy-drama series Orange Is the New Black in 2014.

== Career ==
Roberts made her big screen debut playing supporting role in the 1971 romantic comedy film Minnie and Moskowitz, directed by John Cassavetes. She later had supporting parts in films The Swinging Barmaids (1975), Nashville Girl (1976) and The Student Body (1976). Her first notable role was in the 1977 black and white cult horror film Eraserhead, by David Lynch, playing the "Beautiful Girl Across the Hall" opposite Jack Nance. The film shooting continued for several years from 1972 to 1976. In 1978 she appeared in the film adaptation of The Late Great Planet Earth, and in 1980 had supporting role in the comedy-drama Stardust Memories by Woody Allen. The following years, Roberts made guest-starring appearances in television series, such as Remington Steele, Trapper John, M.D. and Law & Order, and co-starred in films Silent Night, Deadly Night (1984), Sandino (1990), Mac (1992), Mother's Boys (1993) and Fast Food Fast Women (2000).

Roberts performed in a many Off-Broadway, Broadway and regional theatre productions since 1970s, appearing in The Threepenny Opera, Medea, A Streetcar Named Desire and The Little Foxes. In 1996 she made her Broadway debut starring as Lady Saltburn in play Present Laughter. Her notable off-Broadway credits include Three Tall Women, Master Class, The Clean House, A Little Night Music, Richard III, The Voysey Inheritance and Close Ties. In 2014, Roberts originared the role of Miss Ruby in the Steppenwolf Theatre Company play Airline Highway and the following year performed on its Broadway production.

In 2007, Roberts had her most notable film role, playing Mary Shaw, the main antagonist in the supernatural horror film Dead Silence directed by James Wan. That same year, Roberts collaborated with Wan again in his action thriller film Death Sentence, playing Judge Shaw. She later appeared in The Nanny Diaries and in the film adaptation of The Aspern Papers. In 2012 she starred alongside Elliott Gould in the drama film Fred Won't Move Out directed by Richard Ledes. In 2013, Roberts appeared in Justin Timberlake's music video for "Mirrors". In 2014, she had the recurring role in the Netflix comedy-drama series Orange Is the New Black as inmate Erica Taslitz, one of "The Golden Girls". Along with the cast, Roberts received the Screen Actors Guild Award for Outstanding Performance by an Ensemble in a Comedy Series. She later made guest starring appearances in the television series 2 Broke Girls, Girls, The Mick, Great News and The Last O.G..

Roberts starred in a number of short films in her later career. In 2017, Roberts played Joaquin Phoenix's character mother in the psychological thriller film You Were Never Really Here directed by Lynne Ramsay. The film premiered at the 2017 Cannes Film Festival to positive reviews. Film critics Mark Kermode of The Observer praised her performance. She received National Film Awards UK nomination for Best Supporting Actress. In 2021, Roberts appeared in the comedy-drama film Giving Birth to a Butterfly, and starred in the period horror film The Last Thing Mary Saw. Film critics Matt Zoller Seitz of RogerEbert.com and Dennis Harvey of Variety praised her performance in the latter.

== Personal life ==
Roberts was married to actor Pernell Roberts from 1962 to 1971.

== Filmography ==
=== Film ===
Year	Title	Role	Notes
1971	Minnie and Moskowitz	Wife	
1975	The Swinging Barmaids	Sally	
1976	Nashville Girl	Fran	
1976	The Student Body	Mrs. Blalock	
1977	Eraserhead	Beautiful Girl Across the Hall	
1978	The Late Great Planet Earth	Whore of Babylon	
1980	Stardust Memories	Singer	
1985	Happy End	Fly	
1990	Sandino	Mrs. Hanna	
1992	Mac	Woman on Bus	
1994	Mother's Boys	Narrator	
1998	Three Below Zero	Nora Littman	
2000	Fast Food Fast Women	Bella's Mother	
2006	Faceless	Marge Garacci	Short film
2007	Dead Silence	Mary Shaw	
2007	Death Sentence	Judge Shaw	
2007	The Nanny Diaries	Milicent	
2008	Choke	Elegant Lady	
2010	The Aspern Papers	Juliana Bordereau	
2011	The Deteriorationists	Margaret	Short film
2012	Fred Won't Move Out	Susan	
2013	My Day	Mother	Short film Long Island International Film Expo Award for Best Actress in a Short Film; The Indie Fest Film Award for Best Actress; Hollywood Reel Independent Film Festival Award for Best Supporting Actress
2015	Last Words	Miss Larson	Short film
2016	Now	Woman	Short film Nominated — Action On Film International Film Festival Award for Best Performance in an Acting Role; Nominated — Maverick Movie Award for Best Actress: Short; Nominated — World Music & Independent Film Festival for Best Actress in a Short Film; Nominated — Calcutta International Cult Films Festival for Best Actress
2017	You Were Never Really Here	Joe's mother	Nominated — National Film Awards UK for Best Supporting Actress
2017	Final Polish	Claire	Short film Stella Adler Award for Best Excellence in Film; LA Shorts Fest Platinum Award for Best Actress; Nominated — Maverick Movie Award for Best Actress: Short
2019	Nowhere to Nun	Sister Muriel	Short film
2020	Bard Words	Woman	Short film Cult Critic Movie Award for Best Actress; Luis Buñuel Memorial Award for Best Actress
2021	Giving Birth to a Butterfly	Nina	
2021	The Last Thing Mary Saw	Constance	

=== Television ===
Year	Title	Role	Notes
1983	Remington Steele	Rina Casselas	Episode: "Steele Among"
1983	Trapper John, M.D.	Olivia Chapman	Episode: "South Side Story"
1991	Law & Order	Harriet Dutton	Episode: "The Wages of Love"
1993	Sirens		Episode: "Everybody Lies"
1997	The City	Isabelle	Recurring role
2000	Law & Order	Judge Schepps	Episode: "Endurance"
2003	Law & Order: Criminal Intent	Nan Turner	Episode: "Suite Sorrow"
2008	New Amsterdam	Julia	Episode: "Pilot"
2011–2014	The Heart, She Holler	Meemaw	18 episodes
2014–2019	Orange Is the New Black	Taslitz	10 episodes Screen Actors Guild Award for Outstanding Performance by an Ensemble in a Comedy Series
2016	2 Broke Girls	Astrid	Episode: "And the Coming Out Party"
2017	Girls	Senior Citizen	Episode: "What Will We Do This Time About Adam?"
2017	The Mick	Great Grandmother Rita	Episode: "The Matriarch"
2017	Great News	Grammy	Episode: "Love is Dead"
2017	Neon Joe, Werewolf Hunter	Diane	Episode: "Rules of the Road"
2018	The Last O.G.	Mrs. Washington	Episode: "Pilot"
2019	Friends from College	Gummy	Episode: "Old Habits"
2019	NOS4A2	Jolene	Episodes: "The Gas Mask Man" and "The Dark Tunnels"
2023	Teenage Euthanasia	Noona	Voice, 3 episodes
