= A.N.T. Farm =

American teen sitcom

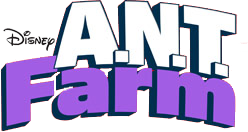
- Genre: Teen sitcom
- Created by: Dan Signer
- Starring: China Anne McClain; Sierra McCormick; Jake Short; Stefanie Scott; Carlon Jeffery; Aedin Mincks
- Theme music composer: Toby Gad; Lindy Robbins; China Anne McClain; Lauryn McClain; Sierra McClain
- Opening theme: "Exceptional" by China Anne McClain
- Ending theme: "Exceptional" (instrumental)
- Composer: Kenneth Burgomaster
- Country of origin: United States
- Original language: English
- No. of seasons: 3
- No. of episodes: 62 (list of episodes)

Production
- Executive producers: Dan Signer; Stephen Engel
- Producers: Julie Tsutsui (season 1); Vic Kaplan (seasons 2–3)
- Camera setup: Videotape (filmized); Multi-camera
- Running time: 22 minutes
- Production companies: It's a Laugh Productions; Gravy Boat Productions

Original release
- Network: Disney Channel
- Release: May 6, 2011 – March 21, 2014

A.N.T. Farm is an American teen sitcom that originally aired on Disney Channel from May 6, 2011, to March 21, 2014. It first aired on May 6, 2011, as a special one-episode preview and continued as a regular series starting on June 17, 2011. After airing as the preview of the series, the pilot episode "transplANTed" later re-aired after the series finale of The Suite Life on Deck. The series was created by Dan Signer, a former writer and co-executive producer of The Suite Life on Deck and creator of the Disney XD/YTV series Mr. Young. In mid-November 2010, Disney Channel greenlit the series, with production beginning in early 2011. The first promo was released during the premiere of Lemonade Mouth.

The series stars China Anne McClain as Chyna Parks, an 11-year-old musical prodigy who is the newest member in the Advanced Natural Talent (A.N.T.) program, a gifted program at Webster High School in San Francisco that allows gifted middle school students to skip middle school and go immediately to high school. Sierra McCormick, Jake Short, Stefanie Scott, Carlon Jeffery, and Aedin Mincks also star.

The series was highly successful, becoming the most popular series on television among children in the age ranges 6 to 11 and 9 to 13. The A.N.T. Farm soundtrack was released on October 11, 2011, and spent five weeks on the Billboard kids chart, peaked at number 29 on the US Billboard 200, and peaked at number 2 on the US Top Soundtracks.

Disney+ premiered A.N.T. Farm for streaming on June 26, 2020.

== Plot ==
A.N.T. Farm follows 11-year-old musical prodigy Chyna Parks (China Anne McClain), who has just become the newest student in the Advanced Natural Talents (A.N.T.) program at Webster High School in San Francisco, California for gifted middle schoolers. On her first day, she befriends Olive Doyle (Sierra McCormick), a girl with an eidetic memory, and Fletcher Quimby (Jake Short), an artistic genius who is otherwise quite dim. The three proceed to go on multiple adventures, using their talents to their advantage.

The school's queen bee, Lexi Reed (Stefanie Scott), views the A.N.T.s as babies who don't belong at Webster High School and often bullies them, particularly Chyna, whom she sees as a threat to her own spotlight. Chyna's older brother Cameron (Carlon Jeffery) attempts to avoid Chyna in school as much as he can, afraid she will be an embarrassment to him. Paisley Houndstooth (Allie DeBerry), Lexi's dim-witted best friend, and Angus Chestnut (Aedin Mincks), a computer science prodigy A.N.T. who harbors a crush on Olive, are major recurring roles in the series, with Angus joining the main cast in season 3.

The third season takes place at a boarding school run by large technology corporation Z-Tech, owned by Zoltan Grundy (Dominic Burgess), after all the A.N.T.s are accepted as students. The series ends with Fletcher winning an arts fellowship in New York City and moving there to follow his dreams, while the other A.N.T.s stay in San Francisco to continue their education.

== Characters ==
=== Main ===
Actor	Character	Season		
Actor	Character	1	2	3
China Anne McClain	Chyna Parks	Main	Main	Main
Sierra McCormick	Olive Doyle	Main	Main	Main
Jake Short	Fletcher Quimby	Main	Main	Main
Stefanie Scott	Lexi Reed	Main	Main	Main
Carlon Jeffery	Cameron Parks	Main	Main	Guest
Aedin Mincks	Angus Chestnut	Recurring	Recurring	Main

The season 1 and 2 main characters of A.N.T. Farm: (from left to right) Lexi Reed, Olive Doyle, Chyna Parks, Fletcher Quimby, and Cameron Parks. Can also use cursor to identify.

- China Anne McClain as Chyna Parks, the A.N.T. program's musical prodigy. She has a natural gift for singing, dancing, and playing many instruments, including the guitar, piano, violin, trumpet, saxophone, flute, cello, harp, bagpipes, French horn, bugle, theremin, drums, harmonica, keyboard, bassoon, tuba, spoons, and banjo. She is the leader of the A.N.T.s.
- Sierra McCormick as Olive Doyle, an A.N.T. with eidetic memory and great knowledge of many facts, which she calls "interesting factoids."
- Jake Short as Fletcher Quimby, an A.N.T. with a talent for art. He has an unrequited crush on Chyna; a running gag within the series is Chyna being oblivious to his romantic advances.
- Stefanie Scott as Lexi Reed, the most popular girl at Webster High and Chyna's vain, self-centered rival. In season three, it is revealed that Lexi is a math prodigy.
- Carlon Jeffery as Cameron Parks (main seasons 1–2, guest star season 3), Chyna's older brother. Unlike his sister, he has no apparent talents. He shows a passion for film-making.
- Aedin Mincks as Angus Chestnut (recurring seasons 1–2, main season 3), a computer genius A.N.T. with a gluttonous appetite and an unrequited crush on Olive.

=== Recurring ===
- Allie DeBerry as Paisley Houndstooth, Lexi's ditsy, kindhearted best friend. Along with Lexi, she is on the cheer squad, even though she does not know how to cheer.
- Zach Steel as Gibson (seasons 1–2), the counselor and tutor of the A.N.T. Farm, who is caring and sensitive, but also dimwitted and childlike.
- Mindy Sterling as Susan Skidmore, the iron-fisted, unsympathetic, and cheap principal of Webster High School who often takes advantage of the A.N.T.s' talents for her own personal gain.
- Finesse Mitchell as Darryl Parks, the hopelessly overprotective father of Chyna and Cameron. He is a "highly decorated" San Francisco police officer.
- Christian Campos as Wacky the Wolf (seasons 1–2), the school mascot.
- Elise Neal as Roxanne Parks (season 1), the mom of Chyna and Cameron. She is a children's birthday party entertainer.
- Matt Lowe as Hippo (seasons 1–2), a man who went from the music business to the movie business to the restaurant business. He is the owner of the International House of Whatever (IHOW).
- Claire Engler as Violet (seasons 1–2), an athletically gifted A.N.T. with an explosive temper. She has an unrequited crush on Fletcher.
- Dominic Burgess as Zoltan Grundy (season 3), a businessman who is the CEO of Z-Tech and its adjacent school.
- Zibby Allen as Madame Goo Goo, a pop celebrity intended to be a parody of Lady Gaga, and Winter Maddox (season 3), the vice president of Z-Tech.
- Piper Curda as Kumiko Hashimoto (season 3), a student at Z-Tech who pretends to be a debate prodigy named Kennedy Van Buren, but is truthfully the daughter of Mr. Hashimoto.
- Tom Choi as Mr. Hashimoto (season 3), the CEO of the Hashimoto Soda Company who first appeared in The Suite Life on Deck.

=== Special guest stars ===
- Zendaya as Sequoia Jones (season 2), a teen movie star who enjoys method acting, though she often takes it too far.
- Vanessa Morgan as Vanessa (season 2), a Canadian model and Cameron's girlfriend. Cameron initially sees her on the cover of a fashion catalogue being read by Lexi and hallucinates that she is a transfer student whom he ends up taking to prom; upon discovering that he imagined the encounter, Chyna tracks down the real Vanessa and introduces the two, and they subsequently begin dating.
- Billy Unger as Berry Figgenbottom, (season 2), an acting prodigy A.N.T. He initially portrays himself as Australian explorer "Tasmanian Neville" and is thought to be an academic prodigy like Olive before his real identity and talent, along with his true sensitive, cowardly nature, are revealed.
- Chris Rock as himself (season 3), who visits the Z-Tech school to buy a rare animal for his daughter.

== Production ==
=== Development ===
Disney Channel announced on November 11, 2010, that they had green-lit the show for production, which began in early 2011. The show was first conceived when Dan Signer, creator of the show, saw China Anne McClain. "The girl had so much confidence. She can nail a joke. She can sing. She can play instruments. It's like China was some sort of child prodigy [...] And that's when it hit me: Why not build a show around a child prodigy? Someone who's got all of this natural talent & ability, but is still challenged when she's sent off to high school at the age of 11?" Signer said in an interview. After the first few episodes of the show were shown, Disney Channel bumped up their order of episodes for the show from 13 episodes to 26 episodes for the first season. On November 30, 2011, it was announced the series was renewed for a second season. On October 2, 2012, it was announced the series was renewed for a third and final season.

=== Casting ===
In 2009, China Anne McClain booked the starring role as Janet in the Disney Channel pilot Jack and Janet Save the Planet alongside future co-stars Sierra McCormick and Jake Short. The pilot was not picked up and never aired. After the pilot was not picked up, Dan Signer began creating another show tailor-made for McClain and cast her as the lead. Sierra McCormick was cast after an audition where she continually talked about tigers. Dan Signer stated "And as I heard her continually talking about tigers, I thought 'That's just how Olive would sound,' because Olive is a fast talking, intelligent student whose talent is memory, which is how Sierra got that part." Jake Short was cast after Signer found him to be likable as an artist during his audition. Jake Short was the last of the three core characters to be cast. Caroline Sunshine was originally cast as Lexi and Stefanie Scott as the role of Tinka Hessenheffer in Shake It Up!, but Dan Signer decided that Sunshine would be better as Tinka and Scott as Lexi, so the two switched roles. Sunshine, however, would later guest star in the episode "some enchANTed evening".

== Episodes ==
Season	Episodes	Originally released	
Season	Episodes	First released	Last released
1	25	May 6, 2011	April 13, 2012
2	20	June 1, 2012	April 26, 2013
3	17	May 31, 2013	March 21, 2014

=== Special episodes ===
Title	Type	Air date	Synopsis	Viewers (millions)
"America Needs TalANT"	Two-part special	November 25, 2011	A reality show called "America Needs Talent" arrives at Webster High, and everyone auditions to be on it; however, the only people who get picked to be finalists on the show are Chyna and Lexi. Unfortunately, Darryl is afraid of flying, so Chyna, Olive, Fletcher, Cameron, and Darryl end up driving to Los Angeles and end up in Solvang, California, where they get harassed by a walrus and get imprisoned in a windmill jail. Eventually, they end up on the turbine of the windmill; Chyna rescues them by slipping through the bars covered in fish oil to slip through and flip the switch to stop it. While this is happening, Lexi's suitcase at the hotel in Hollywood is mistaken for a suitcase filled with money, so Lexi and Paisley try to find it. Later on, Chyna arrives just in time for the show, and both Chyna and Lexi make it to the final round. Lexi then pretends to be Chyna's friend to steal her song and humiliate her on the show, but Chyna overhears Lexi telling Paisley her plan and gives Lexi a fake song, costume design and props to use for the show. Lexi ends up as the one who gets humiliated, but after both performances, Chyna tells Lexi that there is enough spotlight for both of them. Meanwhile, Olive and Paisley enter a game show and Paisley keeps pressing the buzzer with goofy answers. Cameron, Fletcher, and Darryl wait in line at a popular food truck.	3.46
"chANTs of a Lifetime"	Two-part special	November 23, 2012	Chyna is asked to join her favorite band, Trifecta (made up of members Syerra and Laurin), after their lead vocalist, Darlene, gets incredibly ill. The next day, Chyna is treated like a superstar. Sierra and Lauryn show up in disguise and tell Chyna that Darlene decided to quit for good, and they want Chyna to replace her for a year-long tour. Chyna happily agrees, much to Olive and Fletcher's dismay. With Chyna gone, Lexi decides to put on a school musical where she will finally be the star. Furthermore, the A.N.T. Program is being invaded by big kids because Olive and Fletcher are completely helpless without Chyna. Later on, it is revealed that Darlene has been sabotaging Trifecta because Syerra and Laurin fired her for being way too passive-aggressive. Darlene plans to roast them on a lighthouse for revenge, but her plan backfires when she falls out of the lighthouse. In the end, Chyna admits that she misses her friends and family, so she decides to go back to San Francisco.	2.41
"trANTsferred"	Two-part special	May 31, 2013	Zoltan Grundy discovers the ANT farm after Angus breaks into his security system. He builds an ANT boarding school where everyone has to audition to get in after Skidmore pretends she cannot afford a good ANT farm. However, only Olive, Fletcher and Angus get in because Zoltan had chosen another music prodigy whom everyone believes is Lexi. She throws a party to celebrate the new school, but Angus and the others prefer studying. Meanwhile, Olive and Fletcher try to help Chyna find the music room so she can record a song to prove to Zoltan that she belongs there. In the end, Chyna is accepted into the school and it is also revealed that Lexi is not a music prodigy but a math prodigy since, when she finished her performance for her audition, she took out her Z-phone Classic and explained mathematically to Zoltan why she did not get the Z-phone 2 which amazes Zoltan.	2.8

== Broadcast ==
In Canada, the show had a preview on May 23, 2011, with the premiere on June 24, 2011. In New Zealand, it premiered on August 15, 2011, and in Australia on the same day, as well on Seven Network on May 19, 2012. It previewed on September 16, 2011, and premiered on October 7, 2011, in the UK and Ireland. It was released in South Africa on December 10, 2011.

== Songs ==
List of songs in A.N.T. Farm
Song	Performer(s)	Episode(s)	Soundtrack
"Exceptional"	China Anne McClain	All (opening credits) and "influANTces"	A.N.T. Farm
"Dynamite"	China Anne McClain	"transplANTed"	A.N.T. Farm
"My Crush"	China Anne McClain	"replicANT"	A.N.T. Farm
"Unstoppable"	China Anne McClain	"managemANT"	A.N.T. Farm
"Calling All the Monsters"	China Anne McClain	"mutANT farm" and "mutANT farm 2"	A.N.T. Farm
"Beautiful"	China Anne McClain	"America Needs TalANT"	A.N.T. Farm
"DNA"	China Anne McClain	"creative consultANT"	Disney Channel Play It Loud
"Dancin' by Myself"	China Anne McClain	"fANTasy girl" and "ANTswers"	Disney Channel Play It Loud
"I Got My Scream On"	China Anne McClain	"mutANT farm 2"	Make Your Mark: Ultimate Playlist
"Go"	McClain Sisters	"chANTs of a lifetime"	Go - Single
"How Do I Get There from Here"	China Anne McClain	"chANTs of a lifetime"	Make Your Mark: Ultimate Playlist
"Stars Aligning"	China Anne McClain	"trANTsferred"	—N/a
"Turn Back the Clock"	China Anne McClain	"past, presANT, and future"	—N/a
"Wild Card"	China Anne McClain	"uncanny resemblANTs"	—N/a
"Silent Night"	China Anne McClain	"silANT night"	—N/a
"Do Your Own Thing"	China Anne McClain and Roshon Fegan	"the New York experiANTs"	—N/a

== Reception ==
=== Ratings ===
The sneak preview of the series garnered 4.4 million viewers on its premiere night, ranked as TV's No. 1 Telecast in Total Day among Tweens 9-14 (441,000/1.8 rating) and was also TV's No. 1 Telecast among Kids 6-11 (544,000/2.2 rating). Its lead-in, the series finale of The Suite Life on Deck, received 4.6 million.

The episode "The PhANTom Locker" was the most watched episode of the series, scoring 4.6 million viewers, until August 5, 2011, when the episode "informANT" earned 4.9 million viewers right after Phineas and Ferb the Movie: Across the 2nd Dimension. It did better than its lead-in Wizards of Waverly Place, which earned 4.1 million viewers.

In Australia, the episode "transplANTed" delivered 80,000 viewers. In the United Kingdom the same episode had 321,000 viewers, and the episode "participANTs" garnered 240,000 viewers.

Season	Episodes	Season premiere		Season finale		Avg. viewers (Millions)	Most watched episode	
Season	Episodes	Date	Viewers (millions)	Date	Viewers (millions)	Avg. viewers (Millions)	Title	Viewers (in millions)
1	25	May 6, 2011	4.40	April 13, 2012	3.44	3.37	phANTom locker	4.64
2	20	June 1, 2012	2.78	April 25, 2013	2.14	2.87	confinemANT	3.55
3	17	May 31, 2013	2.80	March 21, 2014	1.90	2.78	independANTs	3.50

=== Accolades ===
Year	Award	Category	Nominee	Result	Ref.
2012	NAACP Image Awards	Outstanding Performance by a Youth	China Anne McClain	Nominated	
2012	Nickelodeon Kids' Choice Awards	Favorite TV Actor	Jake Short	Won	
2012	Young Artist Award	Best Performance in a TV series – Supporting Young Actress	Stefanie Scott	Won	
2012	Young Artist Award	Best Performance in a TV series – Guest Starring Young Actress Ten and Under	Francesca Capaldi	Nominated	
2012	Young Artist Award	Best Performance in a TV series – Recurring Young Actress 17–21	Allie DeBerry	Nominated	
2013	NAACP Image Awards	Outstanding Performance by a Youth	China Anne McClain	Nominated	
2014	NAMIC Vision Awards	Best Performance – Actress of Comedy	China Anne McClain	Won	
2014	Nickelodeon Kids' Choice Awards	Favorite TV Actor	Jake Short	Nominated	
2014	NAACP Image Awards	Outstanding Performance by a Youth	China Anne McClain	Won	
