= Make Your Mark: Ultimate Playlist =

Compilation album by Disney Channel stars
- Released: October 16, 2012
- Recorded: 2012
- Genre: Pop; pop rock; teen pop
- Length: 29:17
- Label: Walt Disney
- Producer: Matthew Gerrard

Disney Channel stars chronology
Disney Channel Holiday Playlist (2012)	Make Your Mark: Ultimate Playlist (2012)	Holidays Unwrapped (2013)

Make Your Mark: Ultimate Playlist is a 2012 compilation that was released on October 16, 2012 in the United States. The album features musical artists associated with or popularized by Disney Channel, including Bridgit Mendler, Debby Ryan, Ross Lynch, Zendaya, Bella Thorne, China Anne McClain, Luke Benward, Drew Ryan Scott and Olivia Holt singing their own soundtrack songs. Some songs were recorded prior to the production of this album, while others were recorded specifically for it.

== Track listing ==
No.	Title	Recording Artist(s)	Length
1.	"I Got My Scream On" (from A.N.T. Farm)	China Anne McClain	2:57
2.	"Make Your Mark" (from Shake It Up)	Drew Ryan Scott	3:37
3.	"Fearless" (from Girl vs. Monster)	Olivia Holt	2:35
4.	"How Do I Get There from Here" (from A.N.T. Farm)	China Anne McClain	2:48
5.	"Hey Jessie" (Theme from Jessie)	Debby Ryan	2:23
6.	"TTYLXOX" (from Shake It Up)	Bella Thorne	2:34
7.	"Had Me @ Hello" (from Girl vs. Monster)	Luke Benward	3:23
8.	"Nothing's Gonna Stop Me Now" (from Girl vs. Monster)	Olivia Holt	3:51
9.	"Can't Do It Without You" (main title from Austin & Ally)	Ross Lynch	2:46
10.	"Hang in There Baby" (Theme from Good Luck Charlie)	Bridgit Mendler	2:42
11.	"Something to Dance For" (from Shake It Up)	Zendaya	2:42
12.	"Had Me @ Hello" (from Girl vs. Monster)	Olivia Holt	3:09

== Charts ==
Chart (2012)	Peak position
U.S. Billboard 200	144
U.S. Billboard Kid Albums	5
