= Three Below Zero =

- Directed by: Simon Aeby
- Written by: Simon Aeby
- Produced by: Beatrix Aeby; Simon Aeby; Lutz Kleinselbeck; Roman Kuhn; Martin Schmassmann; Christian von Tippelskirch
- Starring: Wes Bentley; Kate Walsh; Judith Roberts
- Cinematography: Jamie Silverstein
- Edited by: Markus Goller
- Music by: Frank Hoenninger; Stephan Massimo
- Distributed by: Knipp-Film (2002 German theatrical release)
- Release date: August 14, 1998
- Running time: 84 minutes
- Countries: Switzerland; Germany
- Language: English

Three Below Zero is a 1998 Swiss-German drama thriller film, directed by Simon Aeby.

== Premise ==
Two women and a man get locked inside the laundry room of an apartment on a stormy night in New York City.

== Cast ==
- Wes Bentley as Julian Fincher
- Kate Walsh as Moriat Greenberg
- Judith Roberts as Nora Littman
- Don Creech as Mark
- José Rabelo as José
- Jack Williams as Waiter
- D.W. Reiser as Bobby Stricks
- Joseph Small as Televangelist

== Background ==
The film's director Simon Aeby was born in Switzerland, later moving to New York City in the 1980s. Aeby had previously directed for a successful advertising business, and sold his shares in the company so he could move to New York. He became inspired to make his own movie because of Steven Soderbergh, who experienced success with his independent film Sex, Lies, and Videotape in 1989. Aeby had a son during the late 1980s and had to work odd jobs on the side to support his family, all while trying to get a film made. He was eventually able to get financing for his feature debut through help from a TV station, which aired a short film he directed in New York. This station contributed two thirds of the budget, with another investor later coming up with the rest of the money. Aeby started writing the first draft for Three Below Zero late one night, and completed it within the next 10 days.

== Casting and filming ==
Casting for the film occurred at the beginning of 1997 in downtown New York. Aeby spent six weeks trying to find a male lead, eventually coming across 18 year old Wes Bentley on his way to the subway one night. Bentley had just auditioned for the Broadway musical A Chorus Line, but didn't get the part, and the next day was auditioning for Three Below Zero. It was Bentley's first full-length film, having previously appeared in a 1995 short called Serendipity Lane.

Filming occurred over 25 days, between May 27, 1997, and June 20, 1997, after two weeks of preproduction. The first day of shooting was on the hottest day of the summer in New York that year. While it utilized a European crew, all the actors in the film were American.

== Music ==
The opening and closing theme song "Leaving" was performed by the Austrian band Alice in the Fields. In 1998, a CD containing the background score from Frank Hoenninger and Stephan Massimo was released in Germany.

== Release and reception ==
Three Below Zero premiered on August 14, 1998, at the Locarno Film Festival in Switzerland, at a packed 900-seat theater. The film would receive a standing ovation from the crowd. The film then went on a festival tour around Europe and won the prestigious Max Ophüls Award for best picture. Kinowelt, a European distributor, picked up the rights for a theatrical and DVD release in the early 2000s.

Derek Elley of Variety gave the film a mixed review in September 1998, writing that the "basic problem is that the emotional claustrophobia of the setting is never convincingly drawn [...] the characters’ personalities don't really stand up to this much examination — at least, not with the dialogue they're handed." He added, "the three leads make the best of the script and individually have brief moments", also noting that the "whole film has a somewhat flat, underlit look that detracts from Aeby’s use of widescreen." AllMovie's Bhob Stewart gave it only one out of five stars.
