= Disney Holidays Unwrapped =

Holidays Unwrapped

Compilation album by Disney Channel stars
- Released: October 15, 2013
- Recorded: 2012–2013
- Genres: Holiday; pop; pop rock; teen pop
- Length: 29:17
- Label: Walt Disney
- Producer: Matthew Gerrard

Disney Channel stars chronology
Make Your Mark: Ultimate Playlist (2012)	Holidays Unwrapped (2013)	Disney Channel Play It Loud (2014)

Disney Holidays Unwrapped is a 2013 holiday album released exclusively to Target stores in the United States on October 15, 2013.

== Overview ==
The album features musical artists that were, at the time of release, associated with the Disney Channel, including Debby Ryan, Ross Lynch, Bella Thorne, Zendaya and Coco Jones. Tracks on the album are the musicians' covers of traditional and/ or popular holiday songs. Some tracks were recorded prior to the production of the album, while others were recorded specifically for it.

"Shake Santa Shake" and "All I Want for Christmas Is You" by Shake It Up co-stars Zendaya and Caroline Sunshine were both previously included on the 2012 release, Disney Channel Holiday Playlist.

== Track listing ==
No.	Title	Recording Artist(s)	Length
1.	"Christmas Wrapping"	Bella Thorne	3:49
2.	"Shake Santa Shake" (from Shake It Up)	Zendaya	2:57
3.	"Favorite Time of Year" (from Jessie)	Debby Ryan	3:03
4.	"Snowflakes"	Olivia Holt	3:26
5.	"I Love Christmas" (from Austin & Ally)	Ross Lynch and Laura Marano	2:56
6.	"Let It Snow, Let It Snow, Let It Snow" (from Liv and Maddie)	Dove Cameron	1:51
7.	"Lights All Over the World"	Coco Jones	2:58
8.	"Christmas Is Coming" (Acoustic Version)	R5	3:16
9.	"It's Finally Christmas"	Sabrina Carpenter	2:50
10.	"All I Want for Christmas Is You"	Caroline Sunshine	3:41
