= Jerry Jackson =

Jerry Jackson may refer to:

== People ==
- Jerry Jackson (footballer), the oldest player in see Sheffield Wednesday F.C. records
- Jerry Jackson (wrestler), an American wrestler at the 1995 Pan American Games
- Jerry Jackson (choreographer), choreographer for the musical Seven Brides for Seven Brothers
- Jerry Jackson, the mayor of Harrison, Arkansas

== Arts and entertainment ==
- Jerry Jackson, a fictional character in The Wicked Lady
- Jerry Jackson, an animation series by David Firth
- "Jerry Jackson", a song on the 1983 soundtrack album The Wicked Lady

== See also ==
- Jerome Jackson (disambiguation)
- Jeremy Jackson (disambiguation)
- Jeremiah Jackson
- Gerald Jackson, an NCIS character
