= 1 Mile to You =

- Directed by: Leif Tilden
- Screenplay by: Marc Novak
- Based on: Life at These Speeds by Jeremy Jackson
- Produced by: Scott William Alvarez; Tom Butterfield; Peter Holden; F.X. Vitolo
- Starring: Billy Crudup; Graham Rogers; Liana Liberato; Stefanie Scott; Tim Roth
- Cinematography: Gary Shaw
- Edited by: Tamara Meem
- Music by: Paul Doucette
- Production company: Ingenious Media
- Distributed by: Gravitas Ventures
- Release date: April 7, 2017
- Running time: 104 minutes
- Country: United States
- Language: English

1 Mile to You is a 2017 American sports romantic drama film directed by Leif Tilden. It stars Billy Crudup, Graham Rogers, Liana Liberato, Stefanie Scott, Melanie Lynskey, Peter Coyote, and Tim Roth. It is based on Jeremy Jackson's 2002 novel, Life at These Speeds.

== Plot ==
When a teenager loses his girlfriend in a horrible and devastating accident, he finds that his running keeps him connected to her during his "runner's high" moments in which his heart elates and becomes ecstatic. Chasing her memory drives him to run faster and win races for his new coach. Before long, his newfound notoriety attracts the attention of a whip-smart new girl who is determined to find out what's really going on inside him.

== Cast ==
- Billy Crudup as Coach K
- Graham Rogers as Kevin
- Liana Liberato as Henny
- Stefanie Scott as Ellie Butterbit
- Tim Roth as Coach Jared
- Peter Coyote as Principal Umber
- Melanie Lynskey as Coach Rowan
- Jaren Mitchell as Jol Brule
- Thomas Cocquerel as Rye Bledsoe
- Peter Holden as Mr. Schuler

== Production ==
The movie was filmed in Jackson, Mississippi and other locations near it.

== Reception ==
Writing for the Los Angeles Times, Katie Walsh praised the film's performances, but felt that its narrative was "cluttered". Film Journal International's Frank Lovece said it was "shot with great technical control and proficiency", but criticised some of the writing.
