= Jeremy Jackson (author) =

American author

Jeremy Jackson is an American author. He has written two novels, Life at These Speeds (2002), about a high school boy who finds his life through long-distance running and track, and In Summer (2004), with a similar premise, about a high school graduate caught between his adolescence and adulthood. The manuscript of Life at These Speeds won a James A. Michener/Copernicus Society of America Fellowship in 2000 and was later a selection for Barnes & Noble's Discover Great New Writers. The novel became a feature film, 1 Mile to You, starring Billy Crudup and Graham Rogers (2017).

Jackson has also written three cookbooks, The Cornbread Book (2003), Desserts That Have Killed Better Men Than Me (2004) and Good Day for a Picnic (2005). His recipes and food writing have appeared in the Chicago Tribune, The Washington Post, and Food and Wine. The Cornbread Book was nominated for a James Beard Award.

Jeremy Jackson also writes young adult novels under the pseudonym Alex Bradley. Alex Bradley's first novel was 24 Girls in 7 Days (2005), about a romantically challenged teenager who dates 24 girls in 7 days. His second novel was Hot Lunch (2007), about two high school girls who have to take over their school's hot lunch program as punishment for a food fight.
