= Aedin Mincks =

American actor

- Born: October 10, 2000 (age 26); Georgia, U.S.
- Occupation: Actor
- Years active: 2008–present

External image
- Mincks in 2021

Aedin Mincks (born October 10, 2000) is an American actor, best known for his roles as Angus Chestnut on A.N.T. Farm and major recurring character Mitch on Cobra Kai. He is also known for portraying Robert in Ted.

== Career ==
Mincks is known as Angus Chestnut on A.N.T. Farm, which started in 2011. Initially, he was a recurring character for the first two seasons. Mincks became a series regular in season three. Mincks also played Robert in the 2012 comedy film Ted. He also portrayed Mitch in the American martial arts comedy drama Cobra Kai.

== Filmography ==
| Year | Title | Role | Notes |
|---|---|---|---|
| 2008 | The Sarah Silverman Program | Balloon Holding Kid | Episode: "Making New Friends" |
| 2008 | The Tonight Show with Jay Leno | Various characters | Episode: "Episode #17.4" |
| 2009 | ER | Kid #1 | Episode: "The Family Man" |
| 2009 | The Forgotten | Walter Jr. | Episode: "Football Son" |
| 2010 | Desperate Housewives | Joey Murphy | Episode: "How About a Friendly Shrink?" |
| 2010 | Lies in Plain Sight | Boy | Uncredited |
| 2010 | Faster | Tommy | |
| 2011 | The Hangover Part II | Young Alan Garner | Credited as "Alan - 12 Years Old" |
| 2011 | Jimmy Kimmel Live! | Various characters | Episode: "Episode #9.75" |
| 2011 | The Middle | Baumel | Episode: "The Bridge" |
| 2011 | New Girl | Young Schmidt | Episode: "Naked" |
| 2011–2014 | A.N.T. Farm | Angus Chestnut | Recurring role (seasons 1–2); main role (season 3) |
| 2012 | Ted | Robert | |
| 2012 | Teens Wanna Know | Guest | Episode: "Chill at the Queen Mary With Disney & Nick Stars" |
| 2013 | Golden Shoes | Julian | |
| 2013 | The Haunting Hour: The Series | Jason | Episode: "Bad Egg" |
| 2015 | Golden Shoes | Julian | |
| 2015 | Fresh Off the Boat | Bully | |
| 2016 | Little Savages | Eddie | |
| 2016 | Colony | Alex | Episode: "Pilot" |
| 2017 | A Cowgirl's Story | Dale | |
| 2017 | The Mick | Clown #3 | Episode: "The Haunted House" |
| 2019–2025 | Cobra Kai | Mitch | Recurring role (seasons 2–6) |
