= Finesse Mitchell =

American comedian (born 1972)

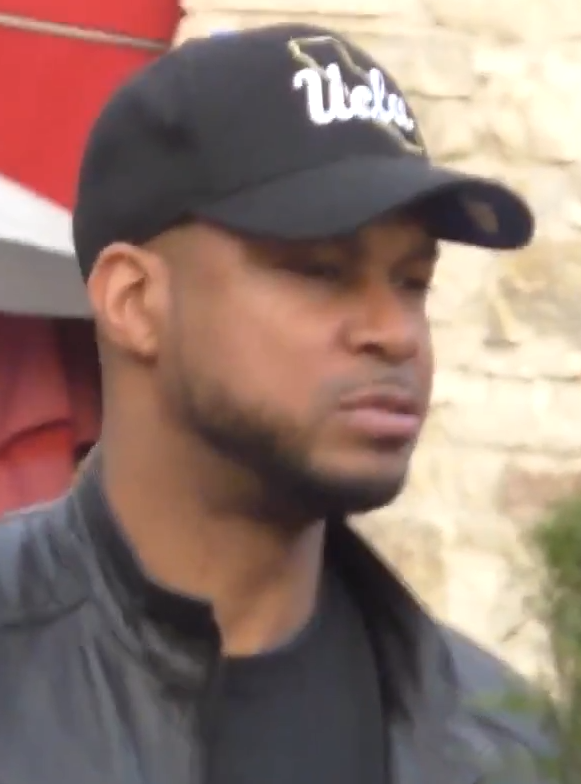
- Mitchell in 2016
- Born: Alfred Langston Mitchell; June 12, 1972 (age 54); Atlanta, Georgia, U.S.
- Education: University of Miami (BA)
- Occupations: Actor; comedian; author
- Years active: 1999–present
- Spouses: Jessica Santos (m. 2008; div. 2011) Adris DeBarge (m. 2013)
- Children: 2
- Website: finessemitchell.com

Alfred Langston "Finesse" Mitchell (born June 12, 1972) is an American actor, stand-up comedian, and author. From 2003 to 2006, Mitchell was a cast member on the NBC sketch comedy series Saturday Night Live. He has also appeared on such television shows as Showtime at the Apollo, BET's ComicView, Comedy Central Presents, Disney Channel's A.N.T. Farm, and NBC's Late Friday.

== Early life ==
Finesse Mitchell was born in Atlanta. He is a graduate of the University of Miami, where he was an important member of the football team that won a national championship and the Kappa Alpha Psi fraternity.

== Career ==
Mitchell made his first television appearance in 1999 on BET's Comic View, where he instantly became a favorite among the show's loyal followers. Shortly after Comic View, Mitchell moved to both Los Angeles and New York City, where he had several appearances on The Late Late Show with Craig Kilborn and two on Late Night with Conan O'Brien.

In 2003, Mitchell became a featured player on Saturday Night Live. After two seasons, in 2005, he was promoted to full cast member. His screen time was drastically reduced after this promotion. In September 2006, it was announced that the show was dropping Mitchell, Chris Parnell and Horatio Sanz due to budget cuts.

After SNL, he has continued to perform stand-up comedy and appeared in the films Who's Your Caddy?, The Comebacks and Mad Money.

From 2008 to 2009, Mitchell made several appearances on The Today Show as a guest correspondent and on Tyra and Chelsea Lately as a guest panelist. In 2010, he appeared in the Comedy Central sketch series Nick Swardson's Pretend Time.

With the help of Quincy Jones's son QD3, Mitchell released his stand-up comedy DVD titled Snap Famous. His 2007 book, Your Girlfriends Only Know So Much, gives dating advice to African-American women.

In 2012, he participated in Fox's dating game show The Choice. Mitchell recurred as Darryl Parks, Chyna's (China Anne McClain) police officer father on the Disney Channel sitcom A.N.T. Farm.

In January 2015, he appeared at Ron White’s Comedy Salute to the Troops. In 2016 he recurred as Harvey in the Showtime series Roadies. He had a role in the film Barely Lethal.

On December 4, 2019, Mitchell was cast as a series regular, playing Irwin on the Fox comedy Outmatched. The character is the best friend of main character Mike.

In 2022, he appeared on the Netflix baking competition Is It Cake? as a judge.

== Personal life ==
On September 13, 2008, he married Jessica Santos in Atlanta. On May 20, 2011, Mitchell and Santos divorced.

He married again, in September 2013, to Adris DeBarge, daughter of singer El DeBarge. Their eldest daughter was born in March 2015.
