= Carlon Jeffery =

American actor (born 1993)

- Born: July 10, 1993 (age 33); Houston, Texas, U.S.
- Other name: Lil' C-Note
- Occupations: Actor, rapper
- Years active: 2006–2014
- Relatives: Carla Jeffery (twin sister)

Carlon Jeffery (born July 10, 1993) is an American actor and rapper. He is best known for playing Cameron Parks in the Disney Channel sitcom A.N.T. Farm (2011–2014).

== Life and career ==
Jeffery was born in Houston, Texas and started performing at the age of eight. He was raised in Cincinnati, Ohio, performing in numerous community venues. He and his family moved to Los Angeles, California in 2005, so he could pursue a career in music and acting. His twin sister, Carla Jeffery, was also an actress, best known for her role in the Zombies film series.

In 2006, he had his first notable acting role, a guest appearance in It's Always Sunny in Philadelphia. In 2007, he appeared in three episodes of the drama series Heroes. Other television roles include Bones and Trust Me.

He co-starred as Cameron Parks in the Disney Channel sitcom A.N.T. Farm, which premiered in 2011. He left the show after the second season ended. However, in October 2013, he appeared as a guest star for the third season episode "Feature PresANTation".

In music, Jeffery is also a rapper, performing under the pseudonym Lil' C-Note.

== Filmography ==
Year	Title	Role	Notes
2006	It's Always Sunny in Philadelphia	Chris	Episode: "The Gang Gives Back"
2007	Eye See Me	Young KC (age 12)	
2007	Heroes	Damon Dawson	Episodes: "The Kindness of Strangers", "Four Months Ago..." and "Truth & Consequences"
2008	After School	Row Row	
2009	Bones	Ezra the Elf	Episode: "The Princess and the Pear"
2009	Trust Me		Episode: "The More Things Change"
2011	The Strange Thing About the Johnsons	Young Isaiah	Short film
2011–2013	A.N.T. Farm	Cameron Parks	Main role (seasons 1–2); guest star (season 3)
2014	Cloud 9	Dink	Main role
2014	Kickin' It	Matt	Episode: "The 'Stang"

=== Music video ===
Year	Title	Artist(s)	Role
2011	"Dynamite"	China Anne McClain	Judge

== Discography ==
=== Albums/Soundtracks ===
- A.N.T. Farm (two songs: "Pose" and "Summertime")
