= 2004 in country music =

This is a list of notable events in country music that took place in 2004.

== Events ==
- June 12- Ferlin Husky celebrates his 50th Grand Ole Opry Anniversary

== Top hits of the year ==
The following songs placed within the Top 20 on the Hot Country Songs or Canada Country charts in 2004:

| US | CAN | Single | Artist |
|---|---|---|---|
| 1 | — | American Soldier | Toby Keith |
| 1 | 1 | Back When | Tim McGraw |
| 18 | 25 | Break Down Here | Julie Roberts |
| 14 | — | Come Home Soon | SHeDAISY |
| 18 | — | Cool to Be a Fool | Joe Nichols |
| 1 | 1 | Days Go By | Keith Urban |
| 6 | 5 | Desperately | George Strait |
| 52 | 4 | Die of a Broken Heart | Carolyn Dawn Johnson |
| 7 | — | Drinkin' Bone | Tracy Byrd |
| 9 | 10 | Feels Like Today | Rascal Flatts |
| 1 | 2 | Girls Lie Too | Terri Clark |
| 11 | — | Good Little Girls | Blue County |
| 3 | 2 | Here for the Party | Gretchen Wilson |
| 8 | 2 | Hey Good Lookin' | Jimmy Buffett with Clint Black, Kenny Chesney, Alan Jackson, Toby Keith and George Strait |
| 4 | — | Honesty (Write Me a List) | Rodney Atkins |
| 5 | — | Hot Mama | Trace Adkins |
| 12 | 27 | How Far | Martina McBride |
| 9 | 26 | I Can't Sleep | Clay Walker |
| 2 | 1 | I Go Back | Kenny Chesney |
| 5 | 9 | I Got a Feelin' | Billy Currington |
| 1 | 3 | I Hate Everything | George Strait |
| 6 | — | I Love You This Much | Jimmy Wayne |
| 3 | — | I Wanna Do It All | Terri Clark |
| 4 | 10 | I Want to Live | Josh Gracin |
| 10 | — | If Nobody Believed in You | Joe Nichols |
| 1 | 3 | If You Ever Stop Loving Me | Montgomery Gentry |
| 1 | 12 | In a Real Love | Phil Vassar |
| 4 | — | In My Daughter's Eyes | Martina McBride |
| 18 | 4 | It Only Hurts When I'm Breathing | Shania Twain |
| 4 | 2 | Let's Be Us Again | Lonestar |
| 2 | 4 | Letters from Home | John Michael Montgomery |
| 2 | — | Little Moments | Brad Paisley |
| 1 | 1 | Live Like You Were Dying | Tim McGraw |
| 5 | 10 | Loco | David Lee Murphy |
| 13 | — | Long Black Train | Josh Turner |
| 1 | 2 | Mayberry | Rascal Flatts |
| 18 | — | Me and Emily | Rachel Proctor |
| 1 | 1 | Mr. Mom | Lonestar |
| 17 | — | My Last Name | Dierks Bentley |
| 1 | 7 | Nothing On but the Radio | Gary Allan |
| 4 | 10 | Paint Me a Birmingham | Tracy Lawrence |
| 7 | 3 | Party for Two | Shania Twain with Billy Currington |
| 12 | 19 | Passenger Seat | SHeDAISY |
| 2 | — | Perfect | Sara Evans |
| 1 | 1 | Redneck Woman | Gretchen Wilson |
| 1 | — | Remember When | Alan Jackson |
| 13 | 28 | Rough & Ready | Trace Adkins |
| 11 | 9 | Save a Horse (Ride a Cowboy) | Big & Rich |
| 5 | 21 | She Thinks She Needs Me | Andy Griggs |
| 9 | — | She's Not Just a Pretty Face | Shania Twain |
| 13 | — | Simple Life | Carolyn Dawn Johnson |
| 1 | 3 | Some Beach | Blake Shelton |
| 1 | 24 | Somebody | Reba McEntire |
| 12 | 10 | Songs About Rain | Gary Allan |
| 16 | — | Spend My Time | Clint Black |
| 3 | 2 | Stays in Mexico | Toby Keith |
| 1 | 3 | Suds in the Bucket | Sara Evans |
| 3 | 4 | Sweet Southern Comfort | Buddy Jewell |
| 2 | 2 | That's What It's All About | Brooks & Dunn |
| 6 | 2 | That's What She Gets for Loving Me | Brooks & Dunn |
| 5 | 4 | Too Much of a Good Thing | Alan Jackson |
| 19 | — | Tougher Than Nails | Joe Diffie |
| 20 | 14 | Trip Around the Sun | Jimmy Buffett with Martina McBride |
| 1 | — | Watch the Wind Blow By | Tim McGraw |
| 1 | 1 | When the Sun Goes Down | Kenny Chesney & Uncle Kracker |
| 1 | 10 | Whiskey Girl | Toby Keith |
| 3 | 6 | Whiskey Lullaby | Brad Paisley featuring Alison Krauss |
| 2 | 2 | The Woman with You | Kenny Chesney |
| 18 | — | You Are | Jimmy Wayne |
| 3 | — | You Can't Take the Honky Tonk Out of the Girl | Brooks & Dunn |
| 1 | 2 | You'll Think of Me | Keith Urban |

== Top new album releases ==
The following albums placed within the Top 50 on the Top Country Albums charts in 2004:

| US | Album | Artist | Record label |
|---|---|---|---|
| 6 | 42 Ultimate Hits | Kenny Rogers | Capitol Nashville |
| 1 | 50 Number Ones | George Strait | MCA Nashville |
| 1 | Be Here | Keith Urban | Capitol Nashville |
| 5 | Between Here and Gone | Mary Chapin Carpenter | Columbia |
| 3 | Blake Shelton's Barn & Grill | Blake Shelton | Warner Bros. |
| 10 | Blue Collar Comedy Tour Rides Again Soundtrack | Various Artists | Warner Bros. |
| 9 | Definitive All-Time Greatest Hits | John Denver | RCA |
| 9 | Dress Rehearsal | Carolyn Dawn Johnson | Arista Nashville |
| 1 | Feels Like Today | Rascal Flatts | Lyric Street |
| 1 | Greatest Hits | Shania Twain | Mercury Nashville |
| 2 | Greatest Hits | Lee Ann Womack | MCA Nashville |
| 4 | Greatest Hits 1994–2004 | Terri Clark | Mercury Nashville |
| 2 | Greatest Hits 2 | Toby Keith | DreamWorks Nashville |
| 2 | Greatest Hits Collection II | Brooks & Dunn | Arista Nashville |
| 7 | Have Your Loved Ones Spayed or Neutered | Jeff Foxworthy | Warner Bros. |
| 1 | Here for the Party | Gretchen Wilson | Epic |
| 1 | Horse of a Different Color | Big & Rich | Warner Bros. |
| 2 | Josh Gracin | Josh Gracin | Lyric Street |
| 9 | Julie Roberts | Julie Roberts | Mercury Nashville |
| 2 | Let's Be Us Again | Lonestar | BNA |
| 3 | Letters from Home | John Michael Montgomery | Warner Bros. |
| 1 | License to Chill | Jimmy Buffett | Mailboat |
| 1 | Live Like You Were Dying | Tim McGraw | Curb |
| 6 | Lonely Runs Both Ways | Alison Krauss & Union Station | Rounder |
| 6 | Lucky Ones | Pat Green | Republic |
| 7 | My Honky Tonk History | Travis Tritt | Columbia |
| 10 | Outlaws and Angels | Willie Nelson | Lost Highway |
| 4 | Patient Man | Brad Cotter | Epic |
| 9 | Patriotic Country | Various Artists | BMG Heritage |
| 3 | Revelation | Joe Nichols | Universal South |
| 10 | Shaken Not Stirred | Phil Vassar | Arista Nashville |
| 7 | Songs Inspired by the Passion of the Christ | Various Artists | Universal South |
| 5 | Soul Gravy | Cross Canadian Ragweed | Universal South |
| 3 | Spend My Time | Clint Black | Equity |
| 2 | Strong | Tracy Lawrence | DreamWorks Nashville |
| 2 | Sweet Right Here | SHeDAISY | Lyric Street |
| 7 | This I Gotta See | Andy Griggs | RCA Nashville |
| 3 | Twice the Speed of Life | Sugarland | Mercury Nashville |
| 10 | The Ultimate Alabama | Alabama | RCA Nashville |
| 2 | Van Lear Rose | Loretta Lynn | Interscope |
| 10 | The Very Best of Dwight Yoakam | Dwight Yoakam | Rhino |
| 10 | The Very Best of Randy Travis | Randy Travis | Rhino |
| 8 | A Very Larry Christmas | Larry the Cable Guy | Warner Bros. |
| 1 | What I Do | Alan Jackson | Arista Nashville |
| 1 | When the Sun Goes Down | Kenny Chesney | BNA |
| 8 | Where I Belong | Rachel Proctor | BNA |
| 2 | You Do Your Thing | Montgomery Gentry | Columbia |

=== Other top albums ===
| US | Album | Artist | Record label |
|---|---|---|---|
| 29 | 25 Number Ones | Conway Twitty | MCA Nashville |
| 20 | 50 Years of Hits | George Jones | Bandit |
| 28 | Amazing Grace 3: A Country Salute to Gospel | Various Artists | Sparrow |
| 17 | Big & Rich's Super Galactic Fan Pak | Big & Rich | Warner Bros. |
| 15 | Bipolar and Proud | Cledus T. Judd | Koch |
| 32 | Blue County | Blue County | Curb |
| 46 | Christmas with You | Clint Black | Equity |
| 12 | Darryl Worley | Darryl Worley | DreamWorks Nashville |
| 27 | A Decade of Laughs | Bill Engvall | Warner Bros. |
| 48 | The Definitive Collection | Don Williams | MCA Nashville |
| 37 | Elvis at Sun | Elvis Presley | RCA |
| 30 | Elvis: Ultimate Gospel | Elvis Presley | RCA |
| 11 | Greatest Hits | Rodney Carrington | Capitol Nashville |
| 23 | Have a Fun Christmas | Various Artists | Time Life |
| 45 | Heroes | The Isaacs | Gaither |
| 50 | Hurt by the Best | Raymond Harris | Cane |
| 12 | It Always Will Be | Willie Nelson | Lost Highway |
| 42 | Katrina Elam | Katrina Elam | Universal South |
| 34 | Keith Urban in the Ranch | The Ranch | Capitol Nashville |
| 22 | Live and Well | Dolly Parton | Blue Eye |
| 27 | Live at Billy Bob's Texas | Willie Nelson | Smith |
| 49 | Lone Starry Night | John Arthur Martinez | Dualtone |
| 31 | Loose, Loud, & Crazy | Kevin Fowler | Equity |
| 27 | My Mother's Hymn Book | Johnny Cash | Lost Highway |
| 23 | The Notorious Cherry Bombs | The Notorious Cherry Bombs | Universal South |
| 35 | One Good Friend | George Canyon | Universal South |
| 23 | Passing Through | Randy Travis | Word/Curb |
| 12 | The Revolution Starts Now | Steve Earle | E-Squared |
| 23 | Savin' the Honky Tonk | Mark Chesnutt | Vivaton! |
| 25 | Shimmy Down the Chimney: A Country Christmas | Various Artists | Capitol Nashville |
| 49 | Show Me How | Lorrie Morgan | Image |
| 46 | This Is Americana | Various Artists | Americana Music Association |
| 42 | Tougher Than Nails | Joe Diffie | Broken Bow |
| 47 | A Traditional Christmas | Joe Nichols | Universal South |
| 22 | Trent Willmon | Trent Willmon | Columbia |
| 46 | Tryin' to Get There | David Lee Murphy | Koch |
| 16 | Ultimate Waylon Jennings | Waylon Jennings | RCA Nashville |
| 39 | Unforgettable | Merle Haggard | Capitol Nashville |
| 31 | Wayward Angel | Kasey Chambers | Warner Bros. |
| 13 | What a Wonderful World | LeAnn Rimes | Asylum-Curb |
| 12 | What If? | Emerson Drive | DreamWorks Nashville |
| 35 | Wheels of Fortune | The Flatlanders | New West |

== Births ==
- March 2 – Avery Anna, country music singer-songwriter of the 2020s.
- May 21 – Hudson Westbrook, country music singer-songwriter of the 2020s ("House Again").
- September 22 – Jessie Murph, multi-genre singer-songwriter rooted in country music ("High Road").

== Deaths ==
- June 10 – Ray Charles, 73, multi-talented artist who combined elements of pop, rhythm and blues, soul and jazz with country music.
- August 9 – Sam Hogin, 52 or 53, co-writer of "A Broken Wing" and other 1990s country singles
- September 19 – Skeeter Davis, 72, best known for "The End of the World."
- September 23 – Roy Drusky, 74, Grand Ole Opry star and smooth countrypolitan stylist of the 1960s.
- October 11 – Max D. Barnes, 68, songwriter and record producer whose peak came in the 1980s and early 1990s.
- October 24 – Angela Herzberg, 36, wife of Gary Allan. (suicide)
- December 27 – Hank Garland, 74, country and jazz guitar pioneer.

== Hall of Fame inductees ==
=== Bluegrass Music Hall of Fame inductees ===
- John Ray "Curly" Seckler
- Bill Vernon

=== Country Music Hall of Fame inductees ===
- Jim Foglesong (born 1922)
- Kris Kristofferson (born 1936)

=== Canadian Country Music Hall of Fame inductees ===
- The Good Brothers
- "Weird" Harold Kendall

== Major awards ==
=== Grammy Awards ===
(presented February 13, 2005 in Los Angeles)

- Best Female Country Vocal Performance – "Redneck Woman", Gretchen Wilson
- Best Male Country Vocal Performance – "Live Like You Were Dying", Tim McGraw.
- Best Country Performance by a Duo or Group with Vocal – "Top of the World (live recording)", Dixie Chicks
- Best Country Collaboration with Vocals – "Portland, Oregon", Loretta Lynn and Jack White
- Best Country Instrumental Performance – "Earl's Breakdown", Nitty Gritty Dirt Band featuring Earl Scruggs, Randy Scruggs, Vassar Clements and Jerry Douglas
- Best Country Song – "Live Like You Were Dying", Tim Nichols and Craig Wiseman
- Best Country Album – Van Lear Rose, Loretta Lynn
- Best Bluegrass Album – Brand New Strings, Ricky Skaggs & Kentucky Thunder

=== Juno Awards ===
(presented April 3, 2005 in Winnipeg)

- Country Recording of the Year – One Good Friend, George Canyon

=== CMT Flameworthy Video Music Awards ===
(presented April 21 in Nashville)

- Video of the Year – "American Soldier", Toby Keith
- Male Video of the Year – "There Goes My Life", Kenny Chesney
- Female Video of the Year – "Forever and for Always", Shania Twain
- Group/Duo Video of the Year – "I Melt", Rascal Flatts
- Breakthrough Video of the Year – "What Was I Thinkin'", Dierks Bentley
- Collaborative Video of the Year – "Beer for My Horses", Toby Keith and Willie Nelson
- Hottest Video of the Year – "No Shoes, No Shirt, No Problems", Kenny Chesney
- Cameo of the Year – "Celebrity", Jason Alexander, James Belushi, Little Jimmy Dickens, Trista Rehn, William Shatner, Brad Paisley
- Video Director of the Year – "Beer for My Horses", Toby Keith and Willie Nelson (Director: Michael Salomon)
- Johnny Cash Visionary Award – Reba McEntire

=== Americana Music Honors & Awards ===
- Album of the Year – Van Lear Rose (Loretta Lynn)
- Artist of the Year – Loretta Lynn
- Song of the Year – "Fate's Right Hand" (Rodney Crowell)
- Emerging Artist of the Year – Mindy Smith
- Instrumentalist of the Year – Will Kimbrough
- Spirit of Americana/Free Speech Award – Steve Earle
- Lifetime Achievement: Songwriting – Cowboy Jack Clement
- Lifetime Achievement: Performance – Chris Hillman
- Lifetime Achievement: Executive – Jack Emerson

=== Academy of Country Music ===
(presented May 17, 2005 in Las Vegas)

- Entertainer of the Year – Kenny Chesney
- Song of the Year – "Live Like You Were Dying", Tim Nichols and Craig Wiseman
- Single of the Year – "Live Like You Were Dying", Tim McGraw
- Album of the Year – Be Here, Keith Urban
- Top Male Vocalist – Keith Urban
- Top Female Vocalist – Gretchen Wilson
- Top Vocal Duo – Brooks & Dunn
- Top Vocal Group – Rascal Flatts
- Top New Artist – Gretchen Wilson
- Video of the Year – "Whiskey Lullaby", Brad Paisley and Alison Krauss (Director: Rick Schroder)
- Vocal Event of the Year – "Whiskey Lullaby", Brad Paisley and Alison Krauss
- ACM/Home Depot Humanitarian of the Year – Neal McCoy

=== ARIA Awards ===
(presented in Sydney on October 17, 2004)

- Best Country Album – Wayward Angel (Kasey Chambers)

=== Canadian Country Music Association ===
(presented September 13 in Edmonton)

- Kraft Cheez Whiz Fans' Choice Award – Terri Clark
- Male Artist of the Year – Jason McCoy
- Female Artist of the Year – Terri Clark
- Group or Duo of the Year – Doc Walker
- SOCAN Song of the Year – "Die of a Broken Heart", Carolyn Dawn Johnson
- Single of the Year – "Simple Life", Carolyn Dawn Johnson
- Album of the Year – Dress Rehearsal, Carolyn Dawn Johnson
- Top Selling Album – Greatest Hits Volume II, Alan Jackson
- CMT Video of the Year – "Simple Life", Carolyn Dawn Johnson
- Chevy Trucks Rising Star Award – George Canyon
- Roots Artist or Group of the Year – Corb Lund

=== Country Music Association ===
(presented November 9 in Nashville)

- Entertainer of the Year – Kenny Chesney
- Song of the Year – "Live Like You Were Dying", Tim Nichols and Craig Wiseman
- Single of the Year – "Live Like You Were Dying", Tim McGraw
- Album of the Year – When the Sun Goes Down, Kenny Chesney
- Male Vocalist of the Year – Keith Urban
- Female Vocalist of the Year – Martina McBride
- Vocal Duo of the Year – Brooks & Dunn
- Vocal Group of the Year – Rascal Flatts
- Horizon Award – Gretchen Wilson
- Video of the Year – "Whiskey Lullaby", Brad Paisley and Alison Krauss (Director: Rick Schroder)
- Vocal Event of the Year – "Whiskey Lullaby", Brad Paisley and Alison Krauss
- Musician of the Year – Dann Huff

=== Hollywood Walk of Fame ===
Stars who were honored in 2004

Randy Travis

== See also ==
- Country Music Association
- Inductees of the Country Music Hall of Fame
