= Benward =

Benward is a surname. Notable people with the surname include:

- Aaron Benward (born 1973), American singer-songwriter
- Jeoffrey Benward (born 1952), American Contemporary Christian music singer and songwriter
- Luke Benward (born 1995), American actor and singer
