= Blue County =

Blue County may refer to:

- Blue County (duo), an American country music duo
  - Blue County (album), a 2004 album by the group
- Blue County, Choctaw Nation, a former political subdivision of the Choctaw Nation in the Indian Territory

== See also ==
- Blue Country, a 1979 album by Joe Dassin
- Blue Country Heart, a 2002 album by Jorma Kaukonen
