= Cloud 9 (2014 film) =

- DVD cover
- Genre: Sports drama Romance; Teen
- Written by: Justin Ware
- Directed by: Paul Hoen
- Starring: Dove Cameron; Luke Benward
- Music by: Alex Wurman
- Country of origin: United States
- Original language: English

Production
- Producers: Ashley Tisdale; Jessica Rhodes; Kirkland Tibbels; Shaun White
- Cinematography: Suki Medencevic
- Editor: Girish Bhargava
- Running time: 85 minutes
- Production companies: Salty Pictures; Blondie Girl Productions

Original release
- Network: Disney Channel
- Release: January 17, 2014

Cloud 9 is a 2014 American romantic sports drama television film directed by Paul Hoen and written by Justin Ware. It stars Dove Cameron, Luke Benward, Kiersey Clemons and Mike C. Manning. The film is set in the world of competitive snowboarding. The first promo aired on November 29, 2013 during the premiere of "Good Luck Jessie: NYC Christmas". The film premiered on January 17, 2014, as a Disney Channel Original Movie.

== Plot ==
In Summit Valley, Colorado, Kayla Morgan begins training to win the "Fire and Ice" snowboarding competition alongside her boyfriend Nick Swift, the son of team coach Sebastian Swift. One night, Nick and his friends steal the sled of famous former snowboarder Will Cloud, and convince Kayla to ride it with Nick. When the sled loses control, Nick abruptly jumps off, causing Kayla to crash into a mountain lodge sign, demolishing it and the sled.

Kayla is expelled from the team and forced to work at the Cloud family's kennel, which Will began working at after ending his snowboarding career, until she can afford to replace the sled. Will and Kayla get into an argument when Kayla claims she is one of the best on the team, but Will claims the only reason she's on the Swift team is because her father owns the resort where Sebastian is employed. Nick confirms this when Kayla confronts him, and eventually admits that Kayla isn't good enough to win Fire and Ice. He later breaks up with Kayla, believing she is distracting him from the competition.

Kayla asks Will to train her for Fire and Ice, offering to remodel the kennel in exchange, but he refuses. Kayla decides to form a team with Will's old teammates, calling them the Hot Doggers after the Cloud family's kennel. She then learns that the Swifts have replaced her with famous snowboarder Skye Sailor. Will eventually agrees to train Kayla. Under Will's guidance, her performance greatly improves, though Nick grows jealous at the budding friendship between the two.

Impressed by the remodeled kennel and grateful to Kayla for restoring Will's passion for snowboarding, Will's mother agrees to give the two a day off. While out with Will, Kayla asks him to join the Hot Doggers. The next morning, Kayla overhears her father, Richard, worrying that she will lose to the Swifts, which strengthens her resolve.

Later, Kayla asks Will to teach her the Cloud 9, a move he created that ultimately ended his career when a video of him failing to perform it went viral. When Will insists she is not ready, Kayla takes a helicopter to the top of the notoriously tall Tyson's Peak and bravely snowboards down the mountain, unaware that she is being broadcast on TV from the helicopter. On the way down, she causes an avalanche that buries her under the snow. When Will rescues her, Kayla admits that she boarded down the peak to impress Will so he would finally agree to teach her the Cloud 9.

After being ridiculed by Nick for taking a fall while boarding, Will finally agrees to teach Kayla the Cloud 9. After a few failed attempts, Nick warns Will that he would be at fault if Kayla were to injure herself. Will accuses Kayla of being obsessed with winning Nick back, and the ensuing argument culminates in a kiss. Later, Sebastian, having heard about Kayla's progress, invites her to rejoin the Swifts, which she accepts.

Right before the competition, Kayla ends up rejoining the Hot Doggers. Nick wins the men's title at Fire and Ice, and Skye also delivers an impressive performance, ensuring Kayla can only beat her with a near-perfect score. Right before her round in Run 2, Richard apologizes to Kayla for not believing in her. Nick, tired of the constant pressure from his father, reveals that he was forced by Sebastian to comply with her removal from the team. Kayla, now more determined than ever to beat the Swifts, successfully lands the Cloud 9, earning a perfect score from all the judges and making the Hot Doggers the overall winners of Fire and Ice. Kayla and her friends celebrate her victory, and even Sebastian applauds her, now regretting his decision to remove her from the team.

== Cast ==
- Dove Cameron as Kayla Morgan
- Luke Benward as Will Cloud
- Mike C. Manning as Nick Swift
- Kiersey Clemons as Skye Sailor
- Amy Farrington as Andrea
- Patrick Fabian as Richard Morgan
- Kenda Benward as Madeline Morgan
- Carlon Jeffery as Dink
- Andrew Caldwell as Sam
- Dillon Lane as Burke Brighton
- Colton Tran as Mike Lamb
- Victoria Moroles as Pia
- Tatum Chiniquy as Linds
- Jeffrey Nordling as Sebastian Swift

== Production ==
Cloud 9 was directed by Paul Hoen, produced by Salty Pictures and Blondie Girl Productions, and written by Justin Ware, Don D. Scott, and Katie Wech. It was executive produced by Ashley Tisdale. Much of the filming for the movie took place at ski resorts in Utah.

== Songs ==
- Dove Cameron and Luke Benward – "Cloud 9"
- Nikki Flores and Don Benjamin – "Across the Sky"
- The PCH Crew – "Never Too Late" (featuring Mayru)
- Krankheadz – "I Want It All"
- Superchick – "One Girl Revolution"
- Meg Contonne, Cut One - "Zoom, Zoom, Zoom"
- Robbie Nevil - "Wotever Dude"
- DNCE - Fly High

== Release ==
Cloud 9 premiered on January 17, 2014, along with the series premiere of I Didn't Do It and a special preview of Win, Lose or Draw. The film originally premiered on January 17, 2014 on Disney Channel and Family Channel. It premiered on February 20, 2014 on Disney Channel (Israel), on February 28, 2014 on Disney Channel (UK and Ireland), on March 23, 2014 on Disney Channel (Southeast Asia), and in mid-2014 on Disney Channel (Australia and New Zealand). Other Disney Channel networks premiered it throughout March and April, with Russia airing it March 1, Italy on March 8, the Eastern European networks on March 15, Spain, Scandinavia and the Netherlands on April 11, France on April 22, and Brazil on May 11. It premiered on June 28 in Australia and on June 26 on Disney Channel (Europe, Middle East and Africa). The movie premiered in Germany in April on Disney Cinemagic.

== Reception ==
=== Critical response ===
David Hiltbrand of The Philadelphia Inquirer described Cloud 9 as a quintessential Disney Channel TV movie, saying it is designed to appeal to tweens with its aspirational, romantic storyline. They noted that while Cloud 9 features exciting slow-motion action scenes, it remains engaging due to its picturesque snowy setting and the inclusion of real athletic performances behind the scenes. Hiltbrand found that delisted its formulaic elements, the film is charming and enjoyable watch for its target audience. Emily Ashby of Common Sense Media gave Cloud 9 a score of four out of five stars and noted the depiction of positive messages and role models, saying that the film succeeds at representing the importance of believing in oneself and putting efforts to reach one's goals.

=== Ratings ===
Cloud 9 was viewed by 4.96 million viewers during its original premiere. Nielsen Media Research, which records streaming viewership on U.S. television screens, estimated approximately 5 million viewers tuned in for the premiere of the inspirational snowboarding movie Cloud 9. The film became the second most-watched telecast of the season across all networks in the kids 2-11 (2.6 million viewers) and kids 6-11 (2.1 million viewers) demographics, ranking just behind Disney Channel’s Good Luck Jessie: NYC Christmas from late November.

=== Home video sales ===
Cloud 9 has grossed $1,881,426 in domestic home video sales.
