= Girl vs. Monster =

2012 TV film

- Promotional poster
- Genre: Comedy horror; Teen sci-fi
- Screenplay by: Annie DeYoung; Ron McGee
- Story by: Annie DeYoung
- Directed by: Stuart Gillard
- Starring: Olivia Holt; Kerris Dorsey; Brendan Meyer; Katherine McNamara; Adam Chambers; Tracy Dawson; Brian Palermo; Luke Benward; Jennifer Aspen
- Theme music composer: Robert Duncan
- Countries of origin: Canada; United States
- Original language: English

Production
- Producers: Tracey Jeffrey; Sheri Singer
- Production location: Vancouver, British Columbia, Canada
- Cinematography: Thomas Burstyn
- Editor: James R. Symons
- Running time: 89 minutes
- Production companies: Bad Angels Productions; Just Singer Entertainment

Original release
- Network: Disney Channel
- Release: October 12, 2012

Girl vs. Monster is a 2012 American comedy horror Disney Channel Original Movie that premiered on October 12, 2012. The film stars Olivia Holt as Skylar, a teenage girl who discovers on the eve of Halloween that she is a fifth-generation monster hunter and that her parents are active monster hunters. The movie was directed by Stuart Gillard and produced by Tracey Jeffrey.

== Plot ==
Skylar Lewis, a fearless 15-year-old teenager with a powerful singing voice, prepares for the ultimate Halloween Bash with her best friends, Henry and Sadie. The plan is for Skylar to sing at the party, with rock band member Ryan Dean. Skylar is crushed when the next afternoon, her parents make her stay home and even activate an alarm system to keep her in. She attempts to sneak out of the house by cutting the power so the alarm system won't work. That unfortunately unleashes a monster named Deimata (that was contained in her parents' monster containment unit) who is determined to feed on the fear of Skylar and her family forever. As Skylar's world is turned upside down, she learns that her parents have been keeping a big secret – that she comes from a long line of monster hunters; she is the 5th generation. Now, it's up to Skylar and her friends to channel their inner strength and conquer more than just this monster. Every person has their own personal monster, which feeds on their fear.

Now that Deimata is loose, Skylar (whose ability to feel fear was blocked since infancy by Deimata) experiences all the fear she never had before and tries to deny what is happening. She, Sadie and Henry go, armed with Skylar's parents' monster-hunting tools, to the party at the McQuarry Mansion. But Henry becomes frozen in fear, after being scared by his monster. Cobb, her parents' assistant, comes and takes him back home to fix him. Meanwhile, Deimata lures Skylar's parents into a trap by pretending that Skylar is in trouble. After this, Myra, Skylar's rival, who is at home with a broken neck, is eating ice cream. Soon, the red smoke comes out and it transforms into Deimata. She then controls Myra and goes to the party where she publicly insults Skylar of being nervous to sing at Ryan's party and Sadie comforts Skylar after she runs out, embarrassed. A possessed Myra sings in Skylar's place and turns to Theodosia and Bob (Sadie and Henry's monsters). Myra falls downstairs after Deimata leaves Myra's body as Skylar and Sadie find her. Myra informs them about Deimata and how she can possess people- like she did with her. Skylar thanks her, and she and Sadie rush to save the people upstairs.

During a confrontation with his personal monster, a fixed and armed Henry learns that letting go of his fears will cause the monsters to disintegrate into nothing. He goes to the mansion to inform Skylar of this. So, she grabs the microphone and tells Ryan to grab his guitar and meet her outside. But, Deimata possesses Ryan to better discourage Skylar from facing her fears, but he manages to break free by facing his greatest fear: asking Skylar out. Skylar faces her fears and sings in front of everybody, while Ryan and his band performs as well. While Skylar sings, all the monsters vanish and Sadie also gathers the courage to stand up to Theodosia by spelling things she couldn't when she was a little girl. When all the monsters are all vanquished, Deimata comes and reveals she cannot be destroyed that way. She then reminds Skylar that she still has Skylar's parents in captivity, and Skylar rushes off to find them, with Sadie and Henry following behind with everybody especially Ryan and Myra watches them from a distance.

Skylar and her friends try to fight off Deimata, but she doesn't seem able to be stopped. Although Skylar has overcome her fear, she soon realizes Deimata is still feeding off of her parents' fears—about Skylar's safety. Once Skylar gets her parents to trust her, Deimata is weakened and the three friends defeat her and capture her. At the end of the movie, Henry and Sadie are shown having no fear by doing what they are scared about doing the most. Later that day, Skylar and Ryan sing at his party in his basement, where Skylar asks Myra to join them and they becomes friends.

In a post-credits scene, the glass of the monster containment unit holding Deimata begins to crack before the screen cuts to black with the sound of shattering glass and Deimata's laugh being heard, hinting that she has escaped once again.

== Cast ==
- Olivia Holt as Skylar Lewis, a strong, fearless teenage girl with a powerful singing voice. Learning that her parents are monster hunters and that Deimata is on the loose, she discovers her biggest fear for the first time: stage fright.
- Kerris Dorsey as Sadie, Skylar's nervous best friend who dreads public speaking.
- Brendan Meyer as Henry, Skylar's best friend who is not too brave and is routinely bullied by the school jocks.
- Katherine McNamara as Myra Santelli, Ryan's ex-girlfriend who resents Skylar until she saves her from Deimata.
- Adam Chambers as Cobb, a friend of Skylar and her family and a monster hunter-in-training. He helps Skylar, Henry and Sadie capture the monsters that were released.
- Tracy Dawson as Deimata, Skylar's personal monster who previously tormented her grandfather before his death.
- Brian Palermo as Steve Lewis, Skylar's father and a monster hunter.
- Luke Benward as Ryan Dean, a friend of Skylar who has a crush on her. He is the lead guitarist in his band called The Backbeats. His fear is asking Skylar out.
- Jennifer Aspen as Julie Lewis, Skylar's mother and a fourth-generation monster hunter.
- Anna Galvin as Theodosia, Sadie's personal monster who represents her fear of failing in school. She frightened Sadie during tests, quizzes, and reports. She even scared her so badly during the fifth grade spelling bee, which led to her misspelling "goat".
- Stefano Giulianetti as Bob The Scarecrow, Henry's personal monster who represents his dismay of being a coward.
- Kurt Ostlund as Lead Jock and Henry's bully.

Megan Charpentier's younger sister, Genea also stars as a trick-or-treater dressed as a fairy princess with Jocelyne Loewen playing the mother who takes her daughters but meets a monster in the form of the dog and is scared off as well as the trick-or-treating girls when the dog turns into a monster.

== Production ==
Disney sent Olivia Holt the script for Girl vs. Monster, after which she auditioned for and secured the role of Skylar Lewis. The movie was produced by Sheri Singer, a Disney Channel producer known for her work on 15 television movies for the network, including all four films in the Halloweentown series. It was written by Annie DeYoung, Ron McGee, and Geoff Rodkey. The film was shot from March 26 to April 30, 2012 in Canada. The film was directed by Stuart Gillard, who had a background in Disney Channel's genre of spooky DCOMs, having directed The Scream Team and both films in the Twitches franchise. Production of the movie was managed by Bad Angels Productions.

Scenes for Girl vs. Monster were shot in Vancouver, specifically in the same woods used for the New Moon scene where Edward Cullen leaves Bella Swan.

Ennio Morricone was originally asked to compose the soundtrack, but reportedly wasn't offered enough.

== Songs ==
- "Fearless" – Olivia Holt
- "Had Me @ Hello" – Luke Benward
- "Nothing's Gonna Stop Me" – Olivia Holt
- "Had Me @ Hello" – Olivia Holt
- "I Got My Scream On" – China Anne McClain
- "Nothing's Gonna Stop Me (Reprise)" – Katherine McNamara
- "Had Me @ Hello" – Olivia Holt, Luke Benward & Katherine McNamara

== Release ==
The trailer of Girl vs. Monster was released on August 31, 2012. The movie premiered on Disney Channel on October 12, 2012. The film was made available to stream on Disney+.

== Reception ==
=== Critical response ===
Lindsay Press of MovieWeb stated that Holt delivers a strong performance as Skylar, portraying a vulnerable teenage girl grappling with a surge of unfamiliar emotions while facing the antagonist, Deimata. They found her portrayal of Skylar's emotional journey to be authentic, highlighting the development of her character from fearfulness to bravery. They also complimented the depiction of Skylar embracing her fears and ultimately confronting them with courage. Jaime Jo Wright of Crosswalk.com said that Girl vs. Monster effectively combines teenage girls with their heartthrobs in a thrilling monster adventure. Wright found the plot to be both engaging and entertaining. They described the movie to be a blend of mild creepiness and engaging adventure, embodying classic Disney elements of teen angst and fantasy. Wright praised the film for its suitability as a Halloween feature for pre-teen and early teenage audiences.

Laura Fries of Variety said that the story of Skylar, who is about to turn 16 and inherit her family's monster-hunting business, adds a unique twist to the typical teen movie narrative. They praised the way the film integrates themes of fear feeding the monsters. Fries complimented choreographer Paul Becker for including some entertaining dance numbers, and Holt's performance of three songs was highlighted as a showcase of her talent. Emily Ashby of Common Sense Media gave Girl vs. Monster a score of four out of five stars and found the film to be a light-hearted Halloween movie suitable for children. Ashby praised the film for its humorous approach, noting that it prevents children from taking the monsters too seriously. They highlighted the positive examples of characters challenging their fears and gaining inner strength, as well as the heartwarming moments that celebrate friendship and family.

=== Ratings ===
Girl vs. Monster premiered on Friday, October 12, 2012, earning 4.9 million viewers with the number 1 scripted cable TV telecast of the night and second TV movie of 2012 in kids tweens and teens 6–14 The film had 271,000 viewers, the first one being Michael Kelly from Park Ridge, in the UK and Ireland when it premiered on October 26, 2012.

=== Accolades ===
| Year | Award | Category | Nominee(s) | Result | Ref. |
|---|---|---|---|---|---|
| 2013 | Directors Guild of America Awards | Outstanding Directing – Children's Programs | Girl vs. Monster | Nominated | |
| 2013 | Writers Guild of America Awards | Children's - Long Form or Special | Girl vs. Monster | Won | |
| 2013 | Golden Reel Awards | Best Sound Editing - Long Form Music in Television | Girl vs. Monster | Nominated | |

== See also ==
- List of films set around Halloween
