= Luke Benward =

American actor & singer (born 1995)

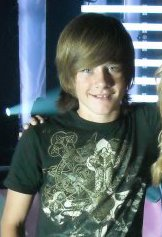
- Luke Benward in 2010
- Born: Luke Aaron Benward; May 12, 1995 (age 31); Franklin, Tennessee, U.S.
- Occupations: Actor; singer
- Years active: 2002–present
- Partner: Ariel Winter (2020–2025)
- Father: Aaron Benward
- Relatives: Jeoffrey Benward (grandfather)
- Musical career
- Instrument: Vocals
- Label: Shine Records

Luke Aaron Benward (born May 12, 1995) is an American actor and singer. He is most known for his Disney Channel roles as Charlie in Minutemen (2008), Ryan in Girl vs. Monster (2012), and Will in Cloud 9 (2014). Benward played the role of Dillon in the Pretty Little Liars spin-off Ravenswood (2013–14) and Bo in the Netflix film Dumplin' (2018). He recurred as Teddy's boyfriend, Beau, on the fourth and final season of the Disney Channel series Good Luck Charlie (2013).

== Early life ==
Benward was born in Franklin, Tennessee, the son of Kenda (née Wilkerson) and Aaron Benward. His father is in the country duo Blue County, his mother is a part-time actress, model, and acting coach, and his grandfather is Contemporary Christian music artist Jeoffrey Benward. Benward has two younger sisters.

== Career ==
Benward's acting career started when he landed a role in the film We Were Soldiers as David Moore in 2002. Benward's success grew in 2006 after playing Billy Forrester in the movie How to Eat Fried Worms, where he won a Young Artist Award for in the category of Best Young Ensemble in a Feature Film.

Benward also played 14-year-old Charlie Tuttle in the Disney Channel movie Minutemen, the 14-year-old Alan in Dear John, and the little boy who helps the abused girl in the music video "Concrete Angel" by Martina McBride. Benward's first release, a five-song EP titled Let Your Love Out, came out on January 5, 2009.

Benward has been in various commercials, including Nintendo, McDonald's, Willy Wonka, American Express, and Hamburger Helper. He also played the role of Nicky in Mostly Ghostly and played Stevie Dewberry in the film Because of Winn-Dixie. Benward also played in the Disney Channel Original Movie Girl vs. Monster as Ryan Dean, the love interest of Skylar Lewis (Olivia Holt).

Benward also had a recurring role as Matthew Pearson, the ex-boyfriend of Emily Hobbs (Ryan Newman) on See Dad Run. He was in the movie Cloud 9 from Disney Channel with Liv and Maddie star Dove Cameron and appeared as Beau, Teddy's love interest, on six episodes of Good Luck Charlie, reuniting Benward with his Minutemen costar Jason Dolley. He appeared as Thor in the third-season premiere of the Disney Channel series Girl Meets World.

== Personal life ==
Benward dated Olivia Holt after meeting her on the set for Disney Channel’s Girl vs. Monster. They split in 2017. From 2020 to August 2025, Benward was in a relationship with actress Ariel Winter.

== Filmography ==
=== Film ===
Year	Title	Role	Notes
2002	We Were Soldiers	David Moore	
2005	Because of Winn-Dixie	Steven "Stevie" Dewberry	
2006	How to Eat Fried Worms	Billy Forrester	
2008	Mostly Ghostly	Nicholas "Nicky" Roland	
2008	Dog Gone	Owen	
2010	Dear John	Alan Wheddon (age 14)	
2014	Field of Lost Shoes	John Wise	
2018	Life of the Party	Jack Strong	
2018	Dumplin'	Bo Larson	
2018	Measure of a Man	Pete Marino	
2019	Grand Isle	Buddy	
2021	Wildcat	Luke	
2021	Playing God	Micah	
2025	Don't Log Off	Adam	

=== Television ===
Year	Title	Role	Notes
2002	Family Affair	Jody Davis	Episode: "Pilot: Parts 1 & 2"
2008	Minutemen	Charles "Charlie" Tuttle	Television film
2012–13	See Dad Run	Matthew Pearson	3 episodes
2012	Girl vs. Monster	Ryan Dean	Television film
2013	Good Luck Charlie	Beau Landry	Recurring role (Season 4, six episodes)
2013–14	Ravenswood	Dillon Sanders	Recurring role (8 episodes)
2014	Cloud 9	Will Cloud	Television film
2014	The Goldbergs	Bruce	Episode: "The Age of Darkness"
2014	R.L. Stine's The Haunting Hour	Ted	Episode: "Near Mint Condition" (Season 4)
2015	CSI: Crime Scene Investigation	Axel Vargas	Episode: "Under My Skin"
2016	Girl Meets World	Thor	Episodes: "Girl Meets High School: Parts One and Two"
2016	Pitch		Episodes: "The Interim"
2017	Still the King	Lloy Danderson	Recurring role (Season 2)
2022	Criminal Minds: Evolution	Benjamin Reeves	Episodes: "Oedipus Wrecks"

== Discography ==
=== Extended play ===
Title	Details
Let Your Love Out	Released: January 5, 2009; Formats: Digital download; Label: iShine Records

=== Promotional singles ===
Title	Year	Album
"Cloud 9" (with Dove Cameron)	2014	Disney Channel Play It Loud

=== Other appearances ===
Title	Year	Album
"Had Me @ Hello"	2012	Make Your Mark: Ultimate Playlist

=== Music videos ===
List of music videos, showing and director
Title	Year	Director(s)	Notes
"Concrete Angel"	2002	—N/a	Martina McBride's music video; guest appearance
"That's Cool"	2004	—N/a	Blue County's music video; guest appearance
"Everyday Hero"	2009	Kenda Benward and Bart Conover	
"Make You Stay"	2016	—N/a	The Girl and the Dreamcatcher music video; guest appearance
"You Make It Easy"	2018	—N/a	Jason Aldean's music video;
