= Painted You Pretty =

2025 song by Hudson Westbrook

Single by Hudson Westbrook

from the album Texas Forever
- Released: March 9, 2026
- Genre: Country
- Length: 3:11
- Label: RiverHouse Artists; Warner Music Nashville
- Songwriters: Hudson Westbrook; Beau Bailey; Lukas Scott
- Producers: Lukas Scott; Ryan Youmans

Hudson Westbrook singles chronology
"House Again" (2025)	"Painted You Pretty" (2026)

"Painted You Pretty" is a song by American country music singer Hudson Westbrook. It was first released on July 25, 2025 as a promotional single from his debut studio album Texas Forever, which was released on the same day, before being sent to country radio on March 9, 2026 as the album's second single. It was written by Westbrook himself, Beau Bailey and Lukas Scott and produced by Scott and Ryan Youmans.

== Composition ==
The song is driven by acoustic guitar and also consists of bass and steel guitar. In the lyrics, Hudson Westbrook describes seeing the woman of his dreams at a bar. He confesses his admirations for her, complimenting her beauty, and becomes interested in learning more about her, asking about her ring and favorite season.

== Live performances ==
Hudson Westbrook performed the song on Today on January 22, 2026 and The Kelly Clarkson Show on April 10, 2026.

== Charts ==
Chart performance for "Painted You Pretty"
Chart (2025–2026)	Peak position
Canada Country (Billboard)	45
Texas Country Music Chart (TCMA)	1
US Billboard Hot 100	64
US Country Airplay (Billboard)	7
US Hot Country Songs (Billboard)	18

== Certifications ==
Region	Certification	Certified units/sales
Canada (Music Canada)	Gold	40,000^{‡}
^{‡} Sales+streaming figures based on certification alone.
