= Playing God (2021 film) =

- Theatrical release poster
- Directed by: Scott Brignac
- Written by: Scott Brignac
- Produced by: Aaron Benward; Russell Grove
- Starring: Luke Benward; Michael McKean; Alan Tudyk; Hannah Kasulka; Jude Demorest; Marc Menchaca
- Music by: Joshua Moore
- Distributed by: Vertical Entertainment
- Release date: August 6, 2021
- Running time: 96 minutes
- Country: United States
- Language: English

Playing God is a 2021 American film written and directed by Scott Brignac and starring Luke Benward, Michael McKean, Alan Tudyk, and Hannah Kasulka. It was released in theaters and on-demand on August 6, 2021.

== Premise ==
Playing God follows "Rachel and Micah, a brother and sister con-artist duo who find themselves scamming a grieving billionaire, Ben, by convincing him they can introduce him to God, face-to-face. They recruit their longtime mentor, Frank, to 'play' God as the three of them attempt the biggest con of their lives."

== Cast ==
- Luke Benward as Micah
- Michael McKean as Frank
- Alan Tudyk as Ben
- Hannah Kasulka as Rachel
- Jude Demorest as June
- Marc Menchaca as Vaughan
- Raoul Canoli as Jesus

== Production ==
On May 14, 2018, it was announced that Scott Brignac was writing and directing a new film entitled Playing God to be produced by Aaron Benward and Russell Grove. Alongside the film's initial announcement, it was confirmed that Luke Benward, Michael McKean, Alan Tudyk, Hannah Kasulka, Jude Demorest, and Marc Menchaca had joined the film's main cast. Principal photography for the film had reportedly begun by May 2018 in Houston, Texas.

== Critical reception ==
Some reviewers allege a disparity between Brignac's apparent intentions and the substance of the film's plot. For instance, Glenn Kenny on RogerEbert.com, writes, "The movie’s ending...suggests that what Brignac was after has not too much to do with what ended up on screen: a parable of forgiveness with genuine theological heft." In that vein, Michael Shindler in The American Conservative compares the film unfavorably to A Serious Man, Winter Light, and Nostalgia, describing it as an instance of "pseudo-religious filmmaking" akin to God's Not Dead, and writes, "In the world as it is, inexplicable tragedy exists: helpless fawns burn in wildfires, babies die excruciating deaths from horrific diseases, plagues wipe out millions, and so on. But in Brignac’s world evil is a cardboard plot device."
