= Nothin' but Cowboy Boots =

Single by Blue County

from the album Blue County
- Released: December 18, 2004
- Genre: Country
- Length: 3:34
- Label: Curb
- Songwriter(s): Aaron Benward; Lee Thomas Miller
- Producer(s): Dann Huff; Doug Johnson

Blue County singles chronology
| "That's Cool" (2004) | "Nothin' but Cowboy Boots" (2004) | "That Summer Song" (2005) |

"Nothin' but Cowboy Boots" is a song recorded by American country music duo Blue County. It was released in December 2004 as the third single from the album Blue County. The song reached #38 on the Billboard Hot Country Singles & Tracks chart. The song was written by Aaron Benward and Lee Thomas Miller.

== Chart performance ==
| Chart (2004–2005) | Peak position |
|---|---|
| US Hot Country Songs (Billboard) | 38 |
