= God. Family. Football. =

- Genre: Sports documentary
- Created by: Aaron Benward
- Starring: Denny Duron
- Country of origin: United States
- Original language: English
- No. of episodes: 6

Production
- Executive producers: Aaron Benward; Drew Buckley; Rob Gehring; Jared Goetz; Howard T. Owens; Ben Silverman; Russell Wilson
- Production location: Shreveport, Louisiana
- Cinematography: Alison Ivosevich
- Running time: 32–36 minutes
- Production companies: Ascendant Media Group; Propagate; Watershed Motion Pictures

Original release
- Network: Amazon Freevee; Fox Nation
- Release: September 1, 2023

God. Family. Football. is an American television documentary series about high school football coach Denny Duron. It premiered on Amazon Freevee on September 1, 2023. It relaunched on Fox Nation with a second season in 2024.

== Summary ==
The docuseries follows high school football coach Denny Duron, who, after 30 years of retirement, returns to lead the football program he originated at Evangel Christian Academy, a private high school in Shreveport, Louisiana. Once a powerhouse, the program is rebuilding after its worst season in school history. The series focuses on the school's 2022 football season, and will feature personal stories of the players and coaching staff, as well as the Shreveport community. The title of the series is based on Duron's motto, "God first, family second, and football third."

== Cast ==
- Denny Duron

== Production ==
On October 13, 2022, it was reported that Amazon Freevee had ordered the docuseries about high school football in Louisiana. The series was created and executive produced by Aaron Benward, executive produced by Ben Silverman, Howard T. Owens, Drew Buckley, and Jared Goetz, and the showrunner and executive producer is Rob Gehring. It is also executive produced by NFL quarterback Russell Wilson.

== Episodes ==
No.	Title	Original release date
1	"The Best is Yet to Come"	1 September 2023
2	"No Pain, No Glory"	1 September 2023
3	"The Cancun Cannon"	1 September 2023
4	"Backs Against the Wall"	1 September 2023
5	"Homecoming"	1 September 2023
6	"Playoff Bound"	1 September 2023

== Release ==
The trailer was released on August 7, 2023. All six episodes premiered on Amazon Freevee on September 1, 2023.
