= Hannah Kasulka =

American actress

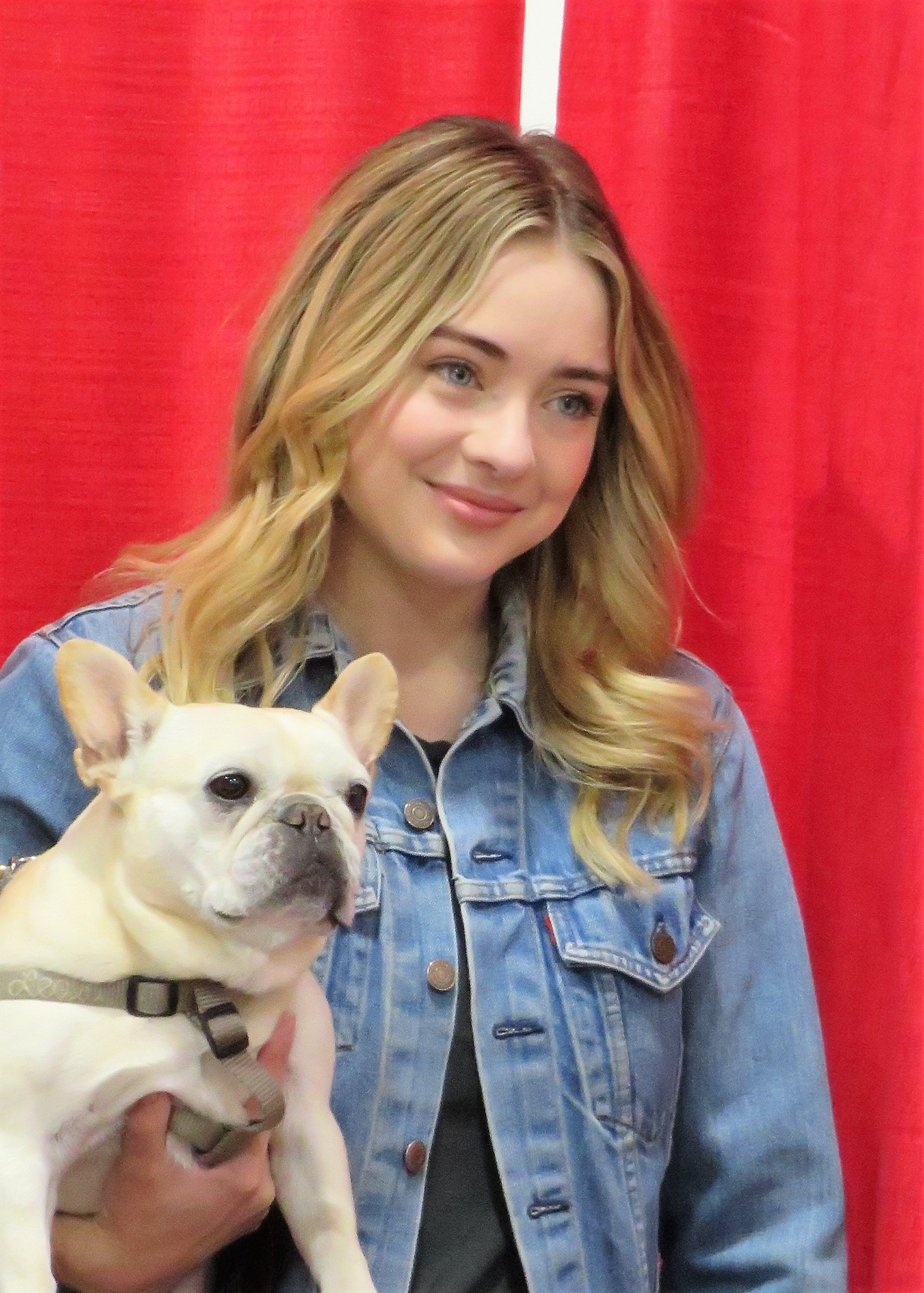
- Hannah Kasulka in 2017
- Born: Macon, Georgia, U.S.
- Education: Georgia Institute of Technology
- Occupation: Actress
- Years active: 2009–present

Hannah Kasulka is an American actress known for her role as Casey Rance in the 2016 Fox television series The Exorcist, and as Meegan Bishop in Filthy Preppy Teen$.

== Early life ==
Kasulka was born and raised in the town of Macon, Georgia, as an only child. She attended the Georgia Institute of Technology in Atlanta, and obtained BS degree in Management in 2009. During her years as a student in university, Kasulka had taken acting lessons, after graduation she moved to Los Angeles, California to pursue an acting career. She started work in a coffee shop, meeting people who persuaded her to join The Upright Citizens Brigade Theatre enrolling in acting and scene study classes, which turned out to be a good platform to launch her acting career.

== Career ==
Kasulka had never even seen the 1973 film The Exorcist before she landed a lead role in the 2016 Fox television series The Exorcist, as Casey Rance, an 18 year-old girl who has been possessed by an evil force.

In 2019, Kasulka acted in, wrote and directed the short film Bird of Shame, shot entirely in black and white with zero dialogue. Kasulka also played the leading role in the horror film Witches In The Woods first screened at the 2019 Arrow Video Frightfest.

In 2021, Kasulka stars in the film Playing God where she plays Rachel in a brother and sister con-artist duo who attempt to swindle a grief-stricken billionaire by deception, introducing him to whom he thinks is God.

== Personal life ==
Kasulka is a supporter of the Sheldrick Wildlife Trust which operates an orphan elephant rescue and rehabilitation program in Kenya.

== Filmography ==
=== Film ===
Year	Title	Role
2010	Fried Tofu (Video short)	Hannah
2011	Game Time: Tackling the Past (TV film)	Allie Jacobs
2012	Every Found Footage Horror Movie Trailer	short film
2012	What to Expect When You're Expecting	Pretty Girl
2013	Filthy (TV film)	Reagan Berg
2013	Prank	Eve Goodwin
2013	Shadow Walkers	Opponent
2013	Drunk Buddies	Short film
2014	The Green Room	short film
2016	Clara (Short film)	Clara
2016	The Cheerleader Murders (TV film)	Morgan Wheeler
2016	Donald Trump's The Art of the Deal: The Movie	Club BG / General BG
2019	Bird of Shame (Short)	The Girl (actress /writer/ director)
2019	Witches in the Woods	Jill
2021	Playing God	Rachel

=== Television ===
Year	Title	Role	Notes
2009	One Tree Hill	Peyton Actress 2	1 episode - Screenwriter's Blues
2012	Up All Night	Amy	1 episode - The Wedding
2012	Nashville	Tatiana	1 episode - I Can't Help It (If I'm Still in Love with You)
2013	True Blood	18 Year-old Faerie Girl	2 episodes
2013	True Blood: Jessica's Blog	Charlaine Bellefleur	1 episode - Faerie Friends
2013	Guys with Kids	Tanya	1 episode - Gary's Idea
2014	CSI: Crime Scene Investigation	Debbie Logan	1 episode - Love for Sale
2015	Perception	Lily Williams	1 episode - Romeo
2015	Filthy Preppy Teen$	Meegan Bishop	8 episodes
2015	How to Get Away with Murder	Megan Harris	1 episode - Skanks Get Shanked
2014-2015	Comedy Bang! Bang!	Production Assistant / Hat Girl	2 episodes
2014-2015	The Fosters	Kaitlyn Reihl / Kaitlyn	7 episodes
2016-2017	The Exorcist	Casey Rance	11 episodes
2017	Drive Share (TV series)	Hannah	1 episode - Marry Me?
2018	Love	Brooklyn	4 episodes
2019	Modern Family	Brandi	1 episode - Tree's a Crowd
2020	The Rookie	Officer Erin Cole	2 episodes
2023	All Rise	Addison Quinn	Season 3 episodes 19 & 20

== Awards and nominations ==
Year	Award	Category	Nominated work	Result	Ref.
2017	iHorror Awards	Best Actress - Horror Series	The Exorcist	Nominated	
