= Denny Duron =

American football player, coach, and pastor (born 1952)

Biographical details
- Born: August 24, 1952 (age 74); Angleton, Texas, U.S.

Playing career
- 1970–1973: Louisiana Tech
- 1974: Birmingham Americans
- 1975: Birmingham Vulcans
- Position: Quarterback

Coaching career (HC unless noted)
- 1977–1982: Evangel College, Shreveport, La.
- 1989-1991; 2020-present: Evangel Christian Academy

Accomplishments and honors

Awards
- NCAA Division II national champion (1973)

Dennis Randall Duron (born August 24, 1952) is a pastor and former American football player and active coach. He played quarterback for the Louisiana Tech Bulldogs football team from 1970 to 1973, helping them win the 1973 Division II National Championships.

Duron later served as the head football coach at Evangel Christian Academy in Shreveport, Louisiana, from 1977 to 1982, and again from 2020–present. He is currently the Head of School at Evangel Christian Academy in Shreveport, Louisiana. He is featured in the 2023 television documentary series God. Family. Football.
