= Tracy Dawson =

Canadian actress, comedian and writer

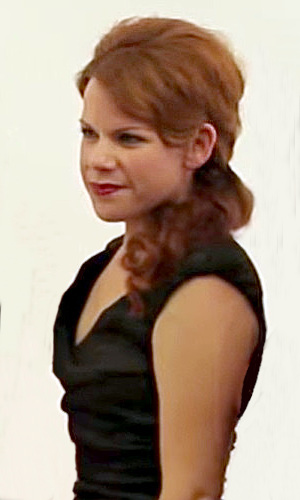
- Dawson in 2011
- Born: 9 April 1983 (age 43); Ottawa, Ontario
- Occupations: film, television and stage actress, playwright
- Known for: Call Me Fitz, The Gavin Crawford Show

Tracy Dawson is a Canadian actress, comedian and writer. She is best known for her role as Meghan Fitzpatrick in Call Me Fitz, for which she won the Gemini Award for Best Lead Actress in a Comedy Series or Program at the 2011 Gemini Awards. She won the same award at the 2nd Canadian Screen Awards. She has lived in Los Angeles since 2006 and gained American citizenship in 2015.

== Career ==
An alumna of The Second City's Toronto company, her other credits include The Gavin Crawford Show, Wild Card, Duct Tape Forever, SketchCom and an appearance as a guest anchor on This Hour Has 22 Minutes in 2006. In 2012, She also portrayed Deimata, Skylar's personal monster from the Disney Channel Original Movie, Girl vs. Monster.

Dawson wrote the stage play Them & Us, which premiered at Theatre Passe Muraille in 2009. She has also written for Call Me Fitz, SketchCom, Single White Spenny, and Your Family or Mine.

In 2022, her book Let Me Be Frank: A Book About Women Who Dressed Like Men To Do Shit They Weren't Supposed To Do was published by HarperCollins.

== Filmography ==
=== Film ===
Year	Title	Role	Notes
2000	Loser	Drug Saleswoman	
2001	On the Line	Goth Girl	
2002	Duct Tape Forever	Mandy Humphrey	
2002	Fancy Dancing	Funny Singer	
2003	Honey	Assistant Director	
2011	Chillerama	Molly	

=== Television ===
Year	Title	Role	Notes
1996	Talk to Me	Thelma	Television film
1998	Goosebumps	Mother	Episode: "Chillogy: Part 1: Squeal of Fortune"
1998, 1999	SketchCom	Various	2 episodes
1999	Twice in a Lifetime	Pauline Kraft	Episode: "O'er the Ramparts We Watched"
2000–2003	The Gavin Crawford Show	Heather Scranton	30 episodes
2001	The Endless Grind	Various	Episode #1.8
2002	Doc	Angel Williams	Episode: "Busy Man"
2003	America's Prince: The John F. Kennedy Jr. Story	Shrine Girl #2	Television film
2004–2005	Wild Card	Maizie / Clerk	4 episodes
2005	G-Spot	Cynthia	Episode: "Gigi Gets a Job"
2005	Recipe for a Perfect Christmas	Cody	Television film
2010–2013	Call Me Fitz	Meghan Fitzpatrick	46 episodes
2012	Girl vs. Monster	Deimata	Television film
