= Sober (Hudson Westbrook song) =

2025 song by Hudson Westbrook

Promotional single by Hudson Westbrook

from the album Texas Forever
- Released: April 25, 2025
- Genre: Country
- Length: 3:30
- Label: RiverHouse Artists
- Songwriters: Hudson Westbrook; Beau Bailey; Lukas Scott; Neil Medley
- Producers: Scott; Ryan Youmans

Music video
- "Sober" on YouTube

"Sober" is a song by American country music singer Hudson Westbrook, released on April 25, 2025, as a promotional single from his debut album, Texas Forever. It was written by Westbrook himself, Beau Bailey, Lukas Scott and Neil Medley and produced by Scott and Ryan Youmans. The song became an instant success on the video-sharing app TikTok, where it was used in over 30,000 videos within its first day of release.

== Composition ==
The song contains organic instrumentation and "bluesy" electric guitar. Lyrically, Hudson Westbrook describes his intense love for a woman, which he compares to being intoxicated without experiencing its negative effects such as hangovers. He comes to believe they are meant to be together and accept that he will always be attracted to her.

== Music video ==
The music video was directed by Emma Kate Golden and released alongside the song. It sees Hudson Westbrook browsing old records and books at a thrift store while thinking about his love interest.

== Certifications ==
Region	Certification	Certified units/sales
Canada (Music Canada)	Gold	40,000^{‡}
^{‡} Sales+streaming figures based on certification alone.
