= Filthy Preppy Teens =

American comedy television series

- Promotional poster
- Genre: Teen sitcom; Satire
- Created by: Paul Scheer; Jonathan Stern; Curtis Gwinn
- Directed by: Danny Jelinek
- Starring: Hannah Kasulka; Max Carver; Malese Jow; Dylan Gelula; Tajh Bellow
- Composer: Matt Novack
- Country of origin: United States
- Original language: English
- No. of seasons: 1
- No. of episodes: 8

Production
- Executive producers: Paul Scheer; Jonathan Stern; Curtis Gwinn; Keith Quinn
- Cinematography: Frank Barrera
- Editors: Jordan Harris; Chris Punsalan; Eric Stran
- Running time: 20–22 minutes
- Production companies: 2nd Man On The Moon; Abominable Pictures; Fox 21 Television Studios (series); Williams Street (pilot)

Original release
- Network: Fullscreen; Adult Swim (pilot)
- Release: April 26 – June 7, 2016

Related
- NTSF:SD:SUV:

Filthy Preppy Teens (stylized as Filthy Preppy Teen$) is an American satirical teen sitcom developed for Fullscreen by Paul Scheer, Curtis Gwinn and Jonathan Stern. The series, in which two wealthy teen siblings try to re-climb the social ladder after being presumed lost at sea, parodies teen dramas such as Pretty Little Liars and Gossip Girl. It debuted on April 26, 2016, as part of the first slate of programming on multi-channel network Fullscreen's eponymous subscription video-on-demand platform as a half-hour format program with an eight-episode order.

The original pilot, Filthy Sexy Teens, aired as a quarter-hour format television special on Adult Swim on October 11, 2013. On April 27, 2015, the project was picked up to series as part of Abominable Pictures' first-look development deal with Fox, with Keith Quinn and Jonathan Stern as executive producers alongside Paul Scheer and Curtis Gwinn.

== Cast ==
This includes the cast members of both the original pilot and the show series.

- A dark grey cell indicates the character was not featured.

Actor	Character	
Actor	Pilot (2013)	Series (2015)
Hannah Kasulka	Reagan Berg	Meegan Bishop
Marshall Allman	Nick	
Chelsea Harris	Jaime	
Amanda Leighton	Whitney	
Steven Yeun	Martin	
Chris Parnell	Sean Hastings	
Sam Trammell	Tom Saxson	
Casey Wilson	Meg Berg	
Johnny Pemberton	Mark Benton	
Max Carver		Chaad Bishop
Malese Jow		Beatrix
Tajh Bellow		Braff
Andrew James Allen		Mitch
Chaley Rose		Tarcher
Dylan Gelula		Parker
Troy Doherty		Patrick
Lilan Bowden		Darcy
Anthony Gioe		Corbin
Gabriel Freilich		Ezra
Justin James Hughes		Porter
Brooke Vallone		Evanessa

== Episodes ==
No.	Title	Directed by	Written by	Original release date
1	"The Return of the Prodigal Teens"	Danny Jelinek	Paul Scheer & Jonathan Stern & Curtis Gwinn	April 26, 2016
2	"Hangout"	Danny Jelinek	Rachel Axler	April 26, 2016
3	"The Running of the Poors"	Danny Jelinek	Tim Neenan & Nicole Shabtai	May 3, 2016
4	"Election"	Danny Jelinek	Tim Neenan	May 10, 2016
5	"St. Patrick's Day"	Danny Jelinek	Emily Strachan	May 17, 2016
6	"Daddy's Home"	Danny Jelinek	Nicole Shabtai	May 24, 2016
7	"The Island"	Danny Jelinek	Kelly Hudson	May 31, 2016
8	"Prommers"	Danny Jelinek	Rachel Axler	June 7, 2016
