= That's Cool =

Single by Blue County

from the album Blue County
- Released: May 15, 2004
- Genre: Country
- Length: 3:50
- Label: Curb
- Songwriter(s): Aaron Benward; Scott Reeves; Lee Thomas Miller
- Producer(s): Dann Huff; Doug Johnson

Blue County singles chronology
"Good Little Girls" (2003)	"That's Cool" (2004)	"Nothin' but Cowboy Boots" (2004)

"That's Cool" is a song recorded by American country music duo Blue County. It was released in May 2004 as the second single from the album Blue County. The song reached number 24 on the Billboard Hot Country Singles & Tracks chart. The song was written by the duo's members Aaron Benward and Scott Reeves along with Lee Thomas Miller.

== Critical reception ==
Deborah Evans Price of Billboard reviewed the song favorably, stating that it had a "great lyric with a pretty melody" and a "tender homage to the past and a celebration of what's most important in the present."

== Chart performance ==
Chart (2004)	Peak position
US Hot Country Songs (Billboard)	24
