= Jarrick Bernard-Converse =

American football player (born 2000)

New York Giants
- Position: Cornerback
- Roster status: Injured reserve

Personal information
- Born: April 29, 2000 (age 26); Baton Rouge, Louisiana, U.S.
- Listed height: 6 ft 1 in (1.85 m)
- Listed weight: 205 lb (93 kg)

Career information
- High school: Evangel Christian Academy (Shreveport, Louisiana)
- College: Oklahoma State (2018–2021); LSU (2022)
- NFL draft: 2023: 6th round, 204th overall pick

Career history
- New York Jets (2023–2024); Cleveland Browns (2025); New York Giants (2025–present)

Awards and highlights
- First-team All-Big 12 (2021)

Career NFL statistics as of Week 12, 2025
- Total tackles: 11
- Stats at Pro Football Reference

Jarrick Bernard-Converse (born April 29, 2000) is an American professional football cornerbackfor the New York Giants of the National Football League (NFL). He played college football for the Oklahoma State Cowboys and LSU Tigers. He was drafted by the New York Jets and has also played for the Cleveland Browns and New York Giants.

== Early life ==
Bernard-Converse was born on April 29, 2000, and grew up in Shreveport, Louisiana. He attended Evangel Christian Academy and played track and football, being a team captain in the latter. He was ranked by 247Sports as the 88th-best safety recruit and the 47th-best player from the state. He committed to play college football for the Oklahoma State Cowboys.

== College career ==
Bernard-Converse saw immediate playing time as a true freshman, totaling in 13 appearances (nine of which he started) 59 tackles, fifth-best on the team, two sacks, two pass breakups, one forced fumble and an interception. The following year, he posted 54 tackles, including two for a loss, five pass breakups, 1.5 sacks and an interception. In 2020, Benard-Converse started all 11 games and recorded 32 tackles, leading all of Oklahoma State's cornerbacks, while also tying for the team lead with seven pass breakups.

Bernard-Converse started all 14 games in 2021, being named first-team all-conference after leading the team with 11 pass breakups. He additionally recorded 51 tackles on the year. He transferred to LSU in 2022. With LSU, he started nine of 13 games, tallying 44 tackles, three pass breakups and two interceptions.

== Professional career ==
Pre-draft measurables
Height	Weight	Arm length	Hand span	Wingspan	40-yard dash	10-yard split	20-yard split	20-yard shuttle	Three-cone drill	Vertical jump	Broad jump	Bench press
6 ft 0 3/4 in (1.85 m)	197 lb (89 kg)	32 1/4 in (0.82 m)	9 3/4 in (0.25 m)	6 ft 7 1/8 in (2.01 m)	4.40 s	1.53 s	2.47 s	4.29 s	6.94 s	42.0 in (1.07 m)	10 ft 6 in (3.20 m)	16 reps
All values from Pro Day

=== New York Jets ===
On his 23rd birthday, Bernard-Converse was selected in the sixth round (204th overall) of the 2023 NFL draft by the New York Jets. He was placed on the reserve/physically unable to perform list to start the 2023 season. He was activated on October 24, 2023.

Jarrick made his NFL debut against the Buffalo Bills in Week 11, appearing on seven special teams snaps.

On August 26, 2025, Bernard-Converse was waived by the Jets as part of final roster cuts.

=== Cleveland Browns ===
On August 27, 2025, Bernard-Converse was claimed off waivers by the Cleveland Browns. He made five appearances for Cleveland, playing mainly on special teams. Bernard-Converse was waived on October 27.

=== New York Giants ===
On October 28, 2025, Bernard-Converse was claimed off waivers by the New York Giants. In four appearances for New York, he recorded four combined tackles. Bernard-Converse was waived by the Giants on December 13 and re-signed to the practice squad. He was promoted to the active roster on January 3, 2026.

On August 7, 2026, Bernard-Converse was waived with an injury designation and reverted to injured reserve the next day.
