= Texas Forever =

Studio album by Hudson Westbrook
- Released: July 25, 2025
- Studios: East Iris Studio A; East Iris Studio C; The Amber Sound
- Genre: Country
- Length: 54:53
- Labels: Warner Nashville; River House Artists
- Producers: Lukas Scott; Ryan Youmans

Hudson Westbrook chronology
Texas Forever (2025)	Made You Look (2026)

Singles from Texas Forever
- 1. "House Again" Released: February 24, 2025; 2. "Painted You Pretty" Released: March 9, 2026

Texas Forever is the debut studio album by American country music singer Hudson Westbrook. It was released on July 25, 2025, through a partnership between Warner Music Nashville and River House Artists.

== Content ==
Westbrook co-wrote all 17 tracks on Texas Forever and the album was produced by Lukas Scott, with additional production on several tracks by Ryan Youmans. The album's title and central theme serves as a tribute to Westbrook's upbringing in Texas: "I'm so proud of this record. I love Texas, it's shaped so much about who I am. We wrote 50-60 songs for this project and narrowed it down to 17 that I think really represent where I am in my life right now and what I love making as an artist: songs that sound like where I grew up, but read like something that just about anyone could relate to." The album features a collaboration with Mackenzie Carpenter ("Lie to Me").

"House Again" was released as the album's lead single and Westbrook's first to country radio on February 24, 2025. Initially released as a promotional single in October 2024 via River House, it amassed over 45 million streams on Spotify, leading to a record deal with Warner Music Nashville and it being jointly promoted to radio.

== Chart performance ==
Texas Forever debuted at number 10 on the Billboard Top Country Albums chart.

== Track listing ==
Texas Forever track listing
No.	Title	Writer(s)	Length
1.	"Darlin'"	Hudson Westbrook; Lukas Scott; Reid Haughton; Neil Medley; Beau Bailey	3:22
2.	"Texas Forever"	Westbrook; Medley; Andrew DeRoberts	3:15
3.	"Painted You Pretty"	Westbrook; Scott; Bailey	3:11
4.	"Funny Seeing You Here"	Westbrook; Medley; Dan Alley; Ryan Beaver	2:58
5.	"Fool"	Westbrook; Medley; Alley; Beaver	3:15
6.	"Momma Raised a Winner"	Westbrook; Scott; Haughton	3:01
7.	"House Again"	Westbrook; Medley; Alley	3:23
8.	"Lie to Me" (featuring MacKenzie Carpenter)	Westbrook; Scott; MacKenzie Carpenter	3:29
9.	"Burning Love"	Westbrook; Medley; Summer Overstreet	3:07
10.	"Damn Good Taste in Whiskey"	Westbrook; Randy Montana	2:55
11.	"Only Girl"	Westbrook; Scott; Haughton; Medley; Bailey	2:51
12.	"First Time"	Westbrook; Scott; Haughton	2:51
13.	"Weatherman"	Westbrook; Scott; Medley; Haughton; Bailey	3:19
14.	"Sober"	Westbrook; Scott; Medley; Bailey	3:31
15.	"Dressed Down"	Westbrook; Scott; Haughton	3:12
16.	"Mine Tomorrow"	Westbrook; Beaver; Alley	3:21
17.	"Hill I'll Die On"	Westbrook; Haughton; Bailey; Scott	3:44
Total length:			54:53

== Personnel ==
Credits are adapted from the album's liner notes.

=== Musicians ===
- Hudson Westbrook – lead vocals
- Lukas Scott – background vocals (tracks 1–4, 8–14, 16, 17), 12-string acoustic guitar (3, 4); acoustic guitar, Dobro, bass, electric guitar (8)
- Rob McNelley – electric guitar (1, 2, 4, 5, 8, 10, 11)
- Mark Hill – bass (1, 2, 4, 5, 9–11)
- Jimmy Wallace – keyboards (1, 2, 4, 10, 11)
- Delaney Ramsdell – background vocals (1, 2)
- Andy Ellison – acoustic guitar (1, 3, 9, 11, 17), steel guitar (1, 9, 11, 17)
- Jerry Roe – drums (1, 11)
- Chris McHugh – drums (2, 4, 5, 8, 10)
- Tim Galloway – acoustic guitar (2, 4, 5, 10), mandolin (2, 5, 10)
- Matt King – drums (3, 6, 7, 12–17)
- Gideon Klein – bass (3, 17), steel guitar (3), keyboards (9)
- Nathan Keeterle – electric guitar (3, 9, 17)
- Jonny Fung – keyboards (3, 9, 17)
- Kaylin Roberson – background vocals (5, 7, 15, 17)
- Austin Addams – electric guitar (6, 7, 12–16), keyboards (7, 12, 14–16), mandolin (13), acoustic guitar (15, 16), banjo (16)
- Ryan Youmans – bass (6, 7, 12–16)
- Devin Malone – acoustic guitar (6, 7, 12–14)
- Joe Spivey – fiddle (6, 13)
- Jenee Fleenor – fiddle (8, 11)
- MacKenzie Carpenter – background vocals (8)
- Eddy Dunlap – steel guitar (12, 14)

=== Technical and visuals ===
- Lukas Scott – production (all tracks), engineering (1–12, 14–16), vocal production (13)
- Ryan Youmans – production, mixing (6, 7, 12–16); engineering (12, 14–16)
- Hudson Westbrook – production (13)
- Andrew Boullianne – engineering (1, 11)
- Grant Morgan – engineering (2, 4, 5, 8, 10)
- Trent Woodman – engineering (3, 9, 17)
- F. Reid Shippen – mixing (1–5, 8–11, 17)
- Brandon Towles – mixing (1–5, 8–11, 17)
- Raclynn Janicke – mastering
- Peyton Dollar – photography
- Ian Noh – photography
- Mike Dupree – creative direction
- Madelyn Ormond – design

== Charts ==
=== Weekly charts ===
Weekly chart performance for Texas Forever
Chart (2025)	Peak position
US Billboard 200	59
US Top Country Albums (Billboard)	10

=== Year-end charts ===
Year-end chart performance for Texas Forever
Chart (2025)	Position
US Top Country Albums (Billboard)	59
