= Blue County (album) =

Studio album by Blue County
- Released: April 6, 2004
- Genre: Country
- Label: Curb
- Producer: Dann Huff; Doug Johnson

Singles from Blue County
- 1. "Good Little Girls" Released: September 29, 2003; 2. "That's Cool" Released: May 15, 2004; 3. "Nothin' but Cowboy Boots" Released: December 18, 2004

Professional ratings
Review scores
Source	Rating
Allmusic	link
Country Standard Time	(mixed) link

Blue County is the debut studio album by American country music duo Blue County, released in 2004 (see 2004 in country music) on Curb Records. The album's debut single, "Good Little Girls", peaked at #11 on the Billboard Hot Country Singles & Tracks (now Hot Country Songs) charts. Also released from this album were "That's Cool" (#24 on the country charts), "Nothin' but Cowboy Boots" (#38) and "That Summer Song" (#53). After these singles, the duo released two more singles for an unreleased second album, before exiting Curb in 2007.

== Track listing ==
No.	Title	Writer(s)	Length
1.	"Good Little Girls"	Troy Seals, Brett Jones	3:01
2.	"That Summer Song"	Stephanie Lewis, Brian E. Nash, Tanya Leah	3:47
3.	"That's Cool"	Aaron Benward, Scott Reeves, Lee Thomas Miller	3:36
4.	"Hollywood, California"	Tommy Lee James, Brett James	3:50
5.	"Sunday Driver"	Alan Levy, Billy Aerts	3:52
6.	"What's Not to Love"	T. L. James, Benward, Reeves	2:58
7.	"Sounds Like Home"	Jon Randall, Benward	3:55
8.	"Nothin' but Cowboy Boots"	Miller, Benward	3:34
9.	"Time Well Spent"	Kris Bergsnes, Jim McCormick, Bobby Pinson	3:52
10.	"Ride On"	Doug Johnson	4:21
11.	"Losing at Loving"	Don Schlitz, Brett James	2:58
12.	"Walk on Water"	Vicky McGehee, Trent Tomlinson, Pinson	3:56

== Personnel ==
Adapted from Blue County liner notes.

Blue County

- Aaron Benward - vocals
- Scott Reeves - vocals

Musicians

- Tim Akers – keyboards
- Bruce Bouton – steel guitar
- Mike Brignardello – bass guitar
- J. T. Corenflos – guitars
- Eric Darken – percussion
- Stuart Duncan – fiddle
- Paul Franklin – steel guitar
- Dann Huff – guitars
- Gordon Kennedy – guitars
- Jimmy Nichols – keyboards
- Lonnie Wilson – drums
- Glenn Worf – bass guitar
- Jonathan Yudkin – banjo, fiddle, mandolin, violin, viola, cello, bouzouki

Technical

- Dann Huff - producer
- Doug Johnson - producer
- Ed Seay - recording, mixing
- Hank Williams - mastering
- Jonathan Yudkin - string composer and arranger on "Time Well Spent"

== Chart performance ==
Chart (2004)	Peak position
U.S. Billboard Top Country Albums	32
U.S. Billboard Top Heatseekers	7
