= Aaron Jeoffrey =

Contemporary Christian music duo

Aaron ♦ Jeoffrey
- Genres: Contemporary Christian
- Occupation(s): Singers, songwriters
- Years active: 1993–2000
- Labels: Starsong
- Spinoffs: Blue County
- Past members: Jeoffrey Benward; Aaron Benward

Aaron Jeoffrey (also Aaron & Jeoffrey; usually stylized as Aaron♦Jeoffrey) was a contemporary Christian music duo, made up of father Jeoffrey Benward and his son Aaron, who recorded pop-style songs during the 1990s. They had four studio albums and one compilation album.

== History ==
Jeoffrey Benward, had already been involved in Christian music since the 1970s. In the early 1990s, Jeoffrey asked his teenage son what he wanted to do for a living, and Aaron replied that he wanted to follow his father's path in music.

Father and son decided to begin recording together, and after being rejected by several labels that had concerns over the unusual pairing, signed with Star Song. Their self-titled debut album was released in 1995. Aaron♦Jeoffrey, which featured guest vocals by dc Talk, produced several singles, including the CCM hit "I Go to the Rock", and "He Is", which lyrically traces the metaphorical names for Christ through all 66 books of the Bible.

The debut album was followed by 'After the Rain' in 1996 and 'The Climb' in 1997.

During their career, Aaron♦Jeoffrey had fourteen Top 5 radio singles, nine of which made it to No. 1. Their albums have sold more than 100,000 copies. They were twice nominated for a GMA Dove Award in the "Song of the Year" category for their classic, "He Is."

=== Founding goal ===
Aaron stated, "One goal is to show a positive parent/child relationship, and hopefully be a role model for fathers and their sons or parents and their children. "We have taken to heart the last prophetic word of the Old Testament, where it says in Malachi 4:6 that 'The fathers' hearts would be turned to their children and the children's hearts to their fathers, lest I smite them with a curse.' Every social problem that we face today can be traced back to a dysfunctional family life. We [want to address] these problems not only through our songs but by simply being who we are."

=== Disbanding ===
In 2000, both father and son decided to follow their individual careers. They still sing together on occasion, and both live in Franklin, Tennessee.

== Discography ==
Year	Album	Peak chart position	Record label	Record producer
1994	Aaron♦Jeoffrey	29	Star Song	Jeff Silvey, Billy Simon, Brian Tankersley
1996	After the Rain	14	Star Song	Brian Tankersley
1997	The Climb	28	Star Song/Chordant	Mark Hammond, Paul Mills
1999	Timeless . . . For Every Generation	—	Ministry Music	Jeoffrey Benward

=== Compilation ===
- 2006: Very Best of Aaron Jeoffrey (EMI)

=== Singles ===
- 1995: "One Million Reasons"
- 1995: "I Go to the Rock"
- 1995: "Heavy on My Heart"
- 1995: "He Is"
- 1995: "Promise Me"
- 1996: "We All Need"
- 1996: "Wait for the Promise"
- 1997: "After the Rain"
- 1997: "Heal Me"
- 1997: "Beyond"
