= Myles Cole =

American football player (born 2000)

Profile
- Position: Defensive end

Personal information
- Born: April 29, 2000 (age 26); Shreveport, Louisiana, U.S.
- Listed height: 6 ft 6 in (1.98 m)
- Listed weight: 278 lb (126 kg)

Career information
- High school: Evangel Christian Academy (Shreveport)
- College: Louisiana–Monroe (2018–2021); Texas Tech (2022–2023)
- NFL draft: 2024: 7th round, 236th overall pick

Career history
- Jacksonville Jaguars (2024); Cincinnati Bengals (2025)*; New Orleans Saints (2026)*
- * Offseason or practice squad member only

Career NFL statistics as of 2025
- Total tackles: 8
- Stats at Pro Football Reference

Myles Cole (born April 29, 2000) is an American professional football defensive end. He played college football for the Louisiana–Monroe Warhawks and Texas Tech Red Raiders.

== Early life and college ==
Cole attended Evangel Christian Academy in Shreveport, Louisiana. He committed to the University of Louisiana at Monroe to play college football.

Cole played at Louisiana-Monroe from 2018 to 2021. In 34 games, he had 41 tackles and 1.5 sacks. After the 2021 season, he transferred to Texas Tech University. In two years at Texas Tech, he played in 25 games and had 44 tackles and 3.5 sacks.

Cole participated in the 2024 Senior Bowl and 2024 NFL Scouting Combine.

== Professional career ==
Pre-draft measurables
Height	Weight	Arm length	Hand span	Wingspan	40-yard dash	10-yard split	20-yard split	20-yard shuttle	Three-cone drill	Vertical jump	Broad jump	Bench press
6 ft 6 in (1.98 m)	278 lb (126 kg)	36 7/8 in (0.94 m)	9 7/8 in (0.25 m)	7 ft 2 1/4 in (2.19 m)	4.67 s	1.65 s	2.73 s	4.72 s	7.73 s	35.0 in (0.89 m)	10 ft 0 in (3.05 m)	20 reps
All values from NFL Combine/Pro Day

=== Jacksonville Jaguars ===
Cole was selected by the Jacksonville Jaguars with the 236th overall selection in the 2024 NFL draft. He made eight appearances for Jacksonville during his rookie campaign, recording eight combined tackles.

On August 26, 2025, Cole was waived by the Jaguars as part of final roster cuts.

=== Cincinnati Bengals ===
On September 9, 2025, Cole was signed to the Cincinnati Bengals' practice squad. He was released by the Bengals on October 30.

=== New Orleans Saints ===
On January 14, 2026, Cole signed a reserve/futures contract with the New Orleans Saints. On August 30, Cole was waived by New Orleans as a part of final roster cuts.
