= Greatest Hits (Rodney Carrington album) =

Greatest hits album by Rodney Carrington
- Released: February 24, 2004
- Recorded: 1998–2004
- Genre: Country Comedy
- Label: Capitol
- Producer: Steve Allee; Rodney Carrington; Carson Chamberlain; Michael Clark; Tom Griswold; Gary Harrison; Bob Hoban

Rodney Carrington chronology
Nut Sack (2003)	Greatest Hits (2004)	King of the Mountains (2007)

Professional ratings
Review scores
Source	Rating
Allmusic	link

Greatest Hits is a two-disc compilation from American stand-up comedian and country music singer Rodney Carrington, with its initial release in 2004. The album consists of selections from his three previous Capitol albums (Morning Wood, Nut Sack and Live: C'mon Laugh You Bastards). The first disc contains stand-up sketches, and the second disc contains music. Two new music tracks, "Put Your Clothes Back On" and "Things We Didn't Know" are included on this compilation as well. "Things We Didn't Know" was Carrington's first non-comedy release.

== Track listing ==
=== Disc 1 – Stand-Up ===
All content on Disc 1 written by Rodney Carrington.

1. "Country Bar - Mechanical Sheep" – 1:20
2. "Going to Heaven Drunk" – 1:17
3. "Good Woman - 'Lucky'" – :53
4. "Wife at Garage Sales" – :50
5. "Growing Up Poor - Toughskin Jeans" – 1:26
6. "Deer Hunting - Snake Hunting" – 1:46
7. "Walmart" – 2:23
8. "Booby Trap" – 1:35
9. "Baptist Revival" – 1:49
10. "People Piss Ya Off" – 1:23
11. "Rodney Scared" – 1:22
12. "The Weenie Story" – 3:24
13. "Chucky Cheese" – 1:26
14. "Japanese Restaurants" – 3:15
15. "Vacation" – 2:44
16. "Hypochondriac" – 6:46
17. "Tips on Marriage" – 3:33
18. "Helicopter" – 2:13

=== Disc 2 – Music ===
All content on Disc 2 written by Rodney Carrington except where noted.

1. "All the Reasons" (Rodney Carrington, Barry Martin) – 2:52
2. "Don't Look Now" – 1:48
3. "That Awful Day" – 1:54
4. "Carlos, Man of Love" (Carrington, Bob Hoban) – 1:41
5. "It's Too Late" (Carrington, Mark Gross) – 3:43
6. "The Night the Bar Closed Down" (Carrington, Gross) – 2:46
7. "Letter To My Penis" (Jazz version) – 2:28
8. "Titties and Beer" – 1:16
9. "In Her Day" – 1:13
10. "Gay Factory Worker" – 1:00
11. "A Dozen Roses" – 3:27
12. "Carlos" – 4:59
13. "Morning Wood" – 1:56
14. "More of a Man" (Carrington, Hoban, Tim Northern) – 2:40
15. "Pickup Truck" (Carrington, Gross) – 1:11
16. "Carlos" – :55
17. "Grandpa" – :57
18. "Sing You Bastards/Burning Sensation" – 2:05
19. "Little Things" – 1:21
20. "Dancing With a Man" – 2:43
21. "Fred" – 2:02
22. "Letter To My Penis" (Country version) – 2:01
23. "Put Your Clothes Back On" (Carrington, Martin) – 1:59
24. "Things We Didn't Know" – 4:25

== Charts ==
=== Weekly charts ===
Chart (2004)	Peak position
US Billboard 200	112
US Top Comedy Albums (Billboard)	3
US Top Country Albums (Billboard)	11

=== Year-end charts ===
Chart (2004)	Position
US Top Country Albums (Billboard)	69

== Certifications ==
Region	Certification
United States (RIAA)	Platinum
