= Hudson Westbrook =

American country singer (born 2004)

- Westbrook at the Empire State Building October 2026

Background information
- Born: Hudson Brown Westbrook; May 21, 2004 (age 22); Stephenville, Texas, U.S.
- Occupations: Singer-songwriter; musician
- Instruments: Vocals; guitar
- Years active: 2020–present
- Labels: River House Artists; Warner Music Nashville
- Website: www.hudsonwestbrook.com

Hudson Brown Westbrook (born May 21, 2004) is an American country singer-songwriter based in Lubbock, Texas. He is known for his country music accomplishments at such a young age, having gone viral on social media.

== Early life ==
Although currently living in Lubbock, he was born and raised on a cattle farm in Stephenville, Texas. He attended college at Texas Tech University, where he worked at a feed store and pursued a major that would prepare him for a career as a landman. He began singing as a freshman in high school, just for fun, to his mom and friends. However, he never thought he was good enough to make a career out of it.

== Career ==
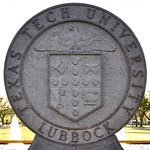
Texas Tech University Seal

His music career took off after his debut single "Take It Slow" went viral on TikTok, garnering millions of views, compelling him to drop out of Texas Tech to pursue music full-time. When it blew up, he decided it was time to start chasing his real dream, immediately buying a bus to begin touring and writing an album. He broke the news of dropping out to his mom on stage during one of his performances. His parents were skeptical at first, but quickly hopped on board after realizing he has a real talent that can take him far. Since then, he has released notable tracks such as, "Two Way Drive", the follow-up to "Take It Slow", and "House Again", a ballad inspired by his parents' divorce, which became his first charting single on the Billboard Hot 100, reaching number 47. His debut album, Texas Forever, was released on July 25, 2025, featuring 17 songs with a country-rock sound. The album includes the tracks "Funny Seeing You Here," "Momma Raised a Winner," and "Lie to Me" featuring Mackenzie Carpenter, and debuted at number 59 on the US Billboard 200. The original idea was to remain loyal to Texas, but now he is touring elsewhere and has performed at many places including the Grand Ole Opry.

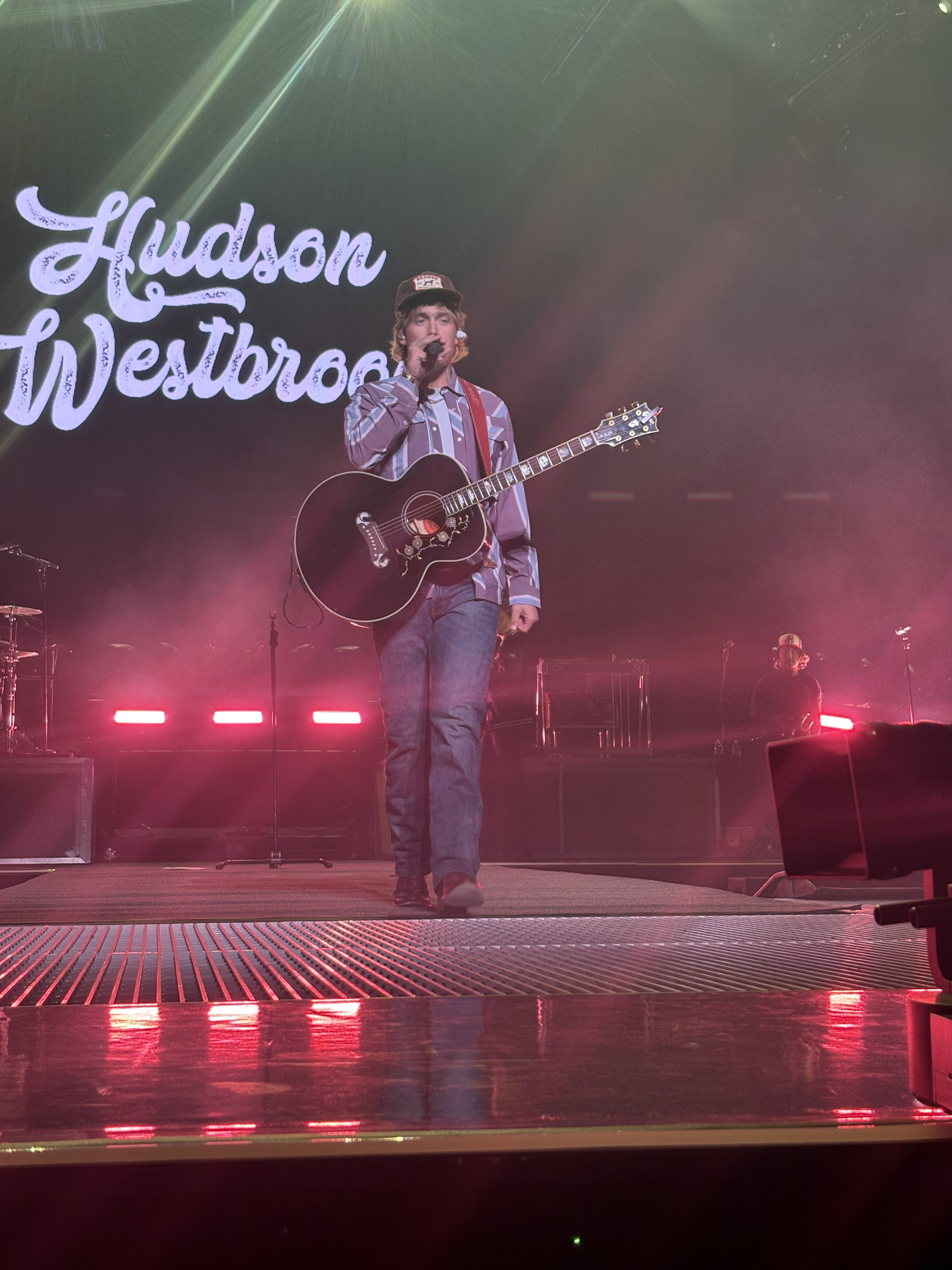
Westbrook performing in 2026

Westbrook's second studio, Made You Look, was released on November 7, 2026.

== Discography ==
=== Studio albums ===
List of studio albums, with selected details and chart positions
Title	Album details	Peak chart positions	
Title	Album details	US	US Country
Texas Forever	Release date: July 25, 2025; Label: Warner Music Nashville/River House Artists	59	10
Made You Look	Release date: November 7, 2026; Label: Warner Music Nashville/River House Artists	—	—

=== Extended plays ===
List of EPs, with selected details
Title	EP details
Hudson Westbrook	Release date: January 13, 2025; Label: River House Artists
Exclusive	Release Date: January 23, 2026; Label: River House Artists

=== Singles ===
List of singles, with selected chart positions
Title	Year	Peak chart positions					Certifications	Album
Title	Year	US	US Country	US Country Airplay	CAN	CAN Country	Certifications	Album
"House Again"	2025	33	10	6	91	36	RIAA: 2× Platinum; MC: 2× Platinum	Texas Forever
"Painted You Pretty"	2026	64	18	7	—	45	MC: Gold	Texas Forever

=== Promotional singles ===
List of singles, with selected chart positions
Title	Year	Peak chart positions	Album
Title	Year	US Country	Album
"Take It Slow"	2024	—	Non-album single
"Mine Tomorrow"	2025	—	Texas Forever
"Dressed Down"	2025	—	Texas Forever
"Bad Reputation"	2025	—	Non-album single
"Sober"	2025	—	Texas Forever
"Cheap Thrills" (with Gavin Adcock)	2026	43	Non-album single

=== Other charted and certified songs ===
List of other charted songs, with selected chart positions
Title	Year	Peak chart positions	Certifications	Album
Title	Year	US Country	Certifications	Album
"5 to 9"	2024	—	RIAA: Gold; MC: Gold	Hudson Westbrook
"Sober"	2025	—	MC: Gold	Hudson Westbrook
"If He Wanted To"	2025	43		Exclusive
"Hits Me"	2026	44		Made You Look

== Awards and nominations ==
Year	Association	Category	Nominated work	Result	Ref.
2026	Academy of Country Music Awards	New Male Artist of the Year	Himself	Nominated	
