= Evangel Christian Academy =

Private, Christian school in Shreveport, Louisiana, United States

Location
- 7425 Broadacres Road; Shreveport, Louisiana 71129; United States; 32.435831°N 93.872128°W

Information
- Type: Private Christian
- Motto: The Best is Yet to Come
- Established: 1980
- School district: Caddo Parish
- Principal: Mrs. Stacie Rathbun
- Head of school: Pastor Denny Duron
- Staff: 15
- Faculty: 60
- Grades: K-12
- Enrollment: 650
- Colors: Red, white, and royal blue
- Athletics: Baseball, Basketball, Football, Tennis, Softball, Wrestling, Volleyball, Soccer, Golf,
- Athletics conference: LHSAA District 1-5A
- Mascot: Eagle
- Nickname: Eagles
- Rival: Airline Vikings; Byrd Yellow Jackets; West Monroe Rebels
- Affiliation: Non-denominational
- Website: http://www.evangelacademy.com

Evangel Christian Academy is a private, Christian school in Shreveport, Louisiana with two campuses spanning grades K-12. It is owned & operated privately in association with Shreveport Community Church (formerly First Assembly of God Church) which is located on the property of the grade school sister campus.

== History ==
Rodney and Frances Duron, parents of the current chancellor, Denny Duron, founded the school in 1980 as a small kindergarten to eighth grade school. The high school was added as a second campus in 1989. Evangel has grown from 21 graduating seniors in 1990 to over 100 seniors in 2001. The school currently has over 675 students.

As of May 2013, according to the SACS website, Evangel is one of twenty-five schools to have earned SACS accreditation in Caddo Parish, and one of eight private schools to have done the same. Evangel Christian Academy is a state approved (K(5)-12) school through the Louisiana State Department of Education.

== Athletics ==
Evangel Christian athletics competes in the LHSAA.

- Baseball
- Basketball
- Cheer
- Football
- Soccer
- Softball
- Swimming
- Tennis
- Track and field
- Wrestling
- Volleyball

Evangel fields basketball, golf, tennis, track and field, volleyball, and wrestling teams at the middle/high school level. The baseball, basketball, football, and softball teams are played at most grade levels K–6th. The Shreveport Country Club is the training ground and tournament facility for the Evangel golf and tennis teams and the Evangel swim teams.

=== Championships ===
Baseball championships

- (6) State Championships: 1995, 2006, 2009, 2011, 2013, 2014

Football championships

- (1) National Championship: 1999
- (14) State Championships: 1993, 1994, 1996, 1997, 1998, 1999, 2001, 2002, 2004, 2005, 2006, 2009, 2010, 2016

Softball championships

- (3) State Championships

Tennis championships

- (3) State Team Championships

=== Football ===
Winning one national championship and fourteen state championships, Evangel's football team was given a prominent place in a book cataloging the top twelve dynasties of high school football

== Arts ==
The drama department puts on at least one major musical per year along with a straight play. ECA drama regularly participates in local, state and national drama competitions.

ECA's band and choir have also grown in recent years. Beyond the traditional arts, Evangel offers two spirit groups, twirlers and cheer teams for their elementary school and cheer for their high school, both competitive in their various divisions.

== Campus ==
The ECA high school campus lies on approximately 100 acres (400,000 m^{2}) in West Shreveport. The high school campus is home to the "main" high school classrooms (divided into "A" and "B" wings with ten rooms on either side serving various purposes) including a library with over thirty-five Dell Dimension 3000 desktop computers (20 more of which that can be found in the computer lab), a main and student office, and a high school cafeteria with food service provided by the Sodexho food service company. These were original at the opening of the high school campus and were built by previous private schools. Further back in the campus are the "T" (temporary) buildings which were added in 1993 by founder Frances Duron to accommodate the growing number of middle and high school students enrolling in the school. The campus also includes one tennis court, one softball, baseball, and football field, and a large basketball gym (built in 1997). The campus is surrounded by woods on two sides and by homes on the other two sides. During the summers the campus is used for summer sports camps.

The elementary campus and Shreveport Community Church occupy approximately 33 acres (130,000 m^{2}) just minutes from the high school campus and located next to I-20. The elementary has recently moved into a new space inside of the renovated church including a new auditorium tailored specifically for elementary school students, a two story indoor climbing playground, several new outdoor play spaces, a fully equipped computer lab, a cafe for parents, and new daycare facilities.

== Notable alumni ==
- Micah Baskerville, NFL linebacker currently for the Chicago Bears, former college football player for the LSU Tigers
- Brock Berlin, former NFL quarterback for the Miami Dolphins, Dallas Cowboys, St. Louis Rams and Detroit Lions
- Jarrick Bernard-Converse, NFL cornerback for the New York Jets
- John David Booty, former NFL quarterback for the Minnesota Vikings, Tennessee Titans and Houston Texans
- Josh Booty, former MLB third baseman for the Florida Marlins, former NFL quarterback for the Seattle Seahawks, Cleveland Browns and Oakland Raiders
- Elijah Chatman, NFL defensive end for the New York Giants
- Myles Cole, NFL outside linebacker for the Jacksonville Jaguars
- Keyunta Dawson, former NFL defensive end for the Indianapolis Colts, Detroit Lions, Tennessee Titans and New Orleans Saints, played collegiately for the Texas Tech Red Raiders
- Dez Duron, former singer and Top 8 contestant on the third season of The Voice, also played quarterback for Yale; the son of the current Evangel chancellor, Denny Duron
- Jacob Hester, former NFL fullback for the San Diego Chargers and Denver Broncos
- Tug Hulett, former MLB second baseman for the Seattle Mariners, Kansas City Royals and Boston Red Sox
- Chase Pittman, former NFL defensive end for the Cleveland Browns, played collegiately for the Texas Longhorns and LSU Tigers
- Jermauria Rasco, former NFL linebacker for the Green Bay Packers, Tampa Bay Buccaneers and Pittsburgh Steelers
- Brittney Rogers, Miss Louisiana USA 2003 and former contestant of Fear Factor, Miss USA 2003 and The Amazing Race (8: Family Edition)
- Blake Shapen, college football quarterback currently for the Mississippi State Bulldogs, previously played for the Baylor Bears
- Richard Smith, former professional football wide receiver
- Trent Taylor, NFL wide receiver and punt returner currently for the San Francisco 49ers, previously played for the Cincinnati Bengals and the Chicago Bears, former college football player for the Louisiana Tech Bulldogs
- Eric Thomas, gridiron football wide receiver currently for the Iowa Barnstormers of the Indoor Football League, formerly in the CFL and the NFL, for the Indianapolis Colts and Buffalo Bills
- Jerry Tillery, NFL defensive end currently for the Minnesota Vikings, previously for the Los Angeles Chargers and the Las Vegas Raiders, former college football player for the Notre Dame Fighting Irish
- Jonathan Wade, former NFL cornerback
- Ar'Darius Washington, NFL safety for the Baltimore Ravens, former college football player for the TCU Horned Frogs
- Sophia Young, former WNBA power forward for the San Antonio Stars
