= Jaime Jo Wright =

American novelist

Jaime Jo Wright is an American author of gothic historical mystery novels.

Wright was born and grew up in Wisconsin and was homeschooled.

Her debut novel, The House on Foster Hill (2017), won both the Christy Award and the Daphne du Maurier Award.

She is a contributing writer to Crosswalk.

== Novels ==
- The House on Foster Hill (2017)
- The Reckoning at Gossamer Pond (2018)
- The Curse of Misty Wayfair (2019)
- Echoes Among the Stones (2019)
- The Haunting at Bonaventure Circus (2020)
- On the Cliffs of Foxglove Manor (2021)
- The Souls of Lost Lake (2022)
- The Premonition at Withers Farm (2022)
- The Vanishing at Castle Moreau (2023)
- The Lost Boys of Barlowe Theater (2023)
- Night Falls on Predicament Avenue (2024)
- Specters in the Glass House (2024)
- Tempest at Annabel's Lighthouse (2025)
