= Jeoffrey Benward =

American singer

- Born: January 10, 1952 (age 74); Fort Wayne, Indiana, U.S.
- Genres: Contemporary Christian music
- Occupations: Singer; songwriter
- Years active: 1970s–present
- Labels: ForeFront
- Formerly of: Aaron Jeoffrey

Jeoffrey Benward (born January 10, 1952) is an American Contemporary Christian music singer and songwriter. He has been involved in the Christian music business since the 1970s, but achieved attention when he formed a duo with his son, Aaron, called Aaron Jeoffrey in 1995. His grandson is actor and singer Luke Benward.

== Life and career ==
Benward was born in Fort Wayne, Indiana. His father, Keith Benward, was also a singer. In the 1970s, Jeoffrey actively toured and recorded, garnering a reputation as one of the industry's most accomplished singer-songwriters. During his early solo career, he released four albums for Forefront Records. He also co-wrote Phillips, Craig and Dean's No. 1 hit "The Concert of the Age."

In the early 1990s, Jeoffrey was surprised to find out his son Aaron wanted to follow his steps. They decided to form a duo debuting in 1995. They ended up releasing three successful albums together, being also nominated for several Dove Awards. In the late 1990s each of them decided to follow their individual careers. He released a self-titled album in 2000. Father and son still occasionally perform together.

Benward was inducted into the Christian Music Hall of Fame.

He and his former wife, Candice, have three children: Aaron, Sareece and Colin.

== Solo discography ==
- Jeoff (1972)
- Jeoff Benward (1985)
- The Redeemer (1988)
- Set It Into Motion (1990)
- Strength For The Journey The Best of Jeoffrey Benward (1996)
- Jeoffrey Benward (2000)
