= Rodney Carrington =

American comedian, musician and actor

- Born: Rodney Scott Carrington; October 19, 1968 (age 57); Longview, Texas, U.S.

Comedy career
- Years active: 1988-present
- Medium: Stand-up, television, radio
- Genres: Country, comedy
- Website: rodneycarrington.com

Rodney Scott Carrington (born October 19, 1968) is an American stand-up comedian, actor, country music artist and songwriter. He has released six major-label studio albums and a greatest hits package, on Mercury Records and Capitol Records. His comedy act typically combines stand-up comedy and original songs. Most of his songs are performed in a neotraditional country style, with Carrington handling lead vocals and guitar. Carrington has also starred in the ABC sitcom Rodney and in the 2008 film Beer for My Horses.

== Early life ==
Rodney Carrington was born in Longview, Texas, in 1968, and lived there until 1990. He worked as a comedian in local venues, gaining exposure through radio programs such as The Bob and Tom Show.

== Career ==
Carrington's first album, Hangin' with Rodney, was released in 1998 via Mercury Records Nashville. This album, consisting of both stand-up comedy and original songs, contained the non-charting single "Letter to My Penis" and peaked at No. 73 on Top Country Albums.

He moved to Capitol Nashville for his next album, 2000's Morning Wood. It was his first Top 20 album on the US Country charts, first Gold-certified recording, and it brought him to the singles charts for the first time with "More of a Man", which reached No. 71 on Hot Country Singles & Tracks (now Hot Country Songs). After it came the live album Live: C'mon Laugh You Bastards, which did not chart. Carrington's third release for Capitol was 2003's Nut Sack. It mostly consisted of studio-recorded comedy songs and only featured five stand-up sketches. It included the single "Don't Look Now" which reached No. 60. The album also featured a new version of "Letter to My Penis", which was recorded in a jazz-swing style.

A Greatest Hits package followed in 2004. This album comprised selections from his Capitol recordings on two discs: stand-up routines on one disc, and songs on the other. It also included two previously unreleased songs: "Put Your Clothes Back On" and his first non-comedy song, "Things We Didn't Know." This compilation album reached No. 3 on the Billboard Top Comedy Albums chart and No. 11 on the Billboard Top Country albums chart, becoming Carrington's first Platinum-certified recording.

Also in 2004, Carrington made his acting debut in Rodney, a sitcom based largely on his own life which aired on ABC for two seasons. He released King of the Mountains in 2007. In addition to reaching No. 2 on the US Comedy Albums chart and No. 15 on the US Country chart, King of the Mountains reached No. 68 on the US Billboard 200 pop albums chart, the highest-ever peak position for any of his recordings. King of the Mountains contains his second serious song, "Angel Friend", a tribute to his best friend Barry Martin, who died suddenly in 2003.

In 2008 he appeared in the film Beer for My Horses, which also starred Toby Keith.

Carrington released his sixth studio album El Niño Loco in 2009. Unlike his previous releases, El Niño Loco does not feature any stand-up sketches. It also contains his third non-comedy song "Funny Man". It was also his first release without a Parental Advisory sticker.

Later in 2009, Carrington released his first Christmas album, Make It Christmas. The album was his final release for Capitol Records. The first single from the album, a non-comedy tribute to soldiers stationed abroad called "Camouflage and Christmas Lights", became his first Top 40 country hit in December 2009.

Carrington has released two more comedy albums on the independent label Laughter's Good Records: Laughter's Good (2014) and Here Comes the Truth (2017). In between these two, he also released a compilation album of re-recordings of comedy songs, titled Rodney Carrington: The Hits (2015).

Carrington continues to tour as of 2026.

== Personal life ==
Carrington lives in Oklahoma, where his 2004–2006 sitcom was set.

== Discography ==
=== Studio albums ===
Title	Album details	Peak chart positions					Certifications and sales
Title	Album details	US Country	US	US Comedy	US Heat	US Indie	Certifications and sales
Hangin' with Rodney	Release date: June 2, 1998; Label: Mercury Nashville; Formats: CD, cassette	73	—	—	—	—	
Morning Wood	Release date: August 15, 2000; Label: Capitol Nashville; Formats: CD, cassette	18	153	—	6	—	US: Gold
Nut Sack	Release date: February 11, 2003; Label: Capitol Nashville; Formats: CD	14	82	—	—	—	
King of the Mountains	Release date: April 3, 2007; Label: Capitol Nashville; Formats: CD, music download	15	68	2	—	—	
El Niño Loco	Release date: June 16, 2009; Label: Capitol Nashville; Formats: CD, music download	19	76	2	—	—	
Laughter's Good	Release date: October 28, 2014; Label: Laughter's Good Records; Formats: CD, music download	23	91	1	—	23	US: 25,800
Here Comes The Truth	Release date: September 13, 2017; Label: Laughter's Good Records; Formats: CD, music download	—	—	3	—	—	
"—" denotes releases that did not chart

=== Compilation albums ===
Title	Album details	Peak chart positions			Certifications (sales threshold)
Title	Album details	US Country	US	US Comedy	Certifications (sales threshold)
Greatest Hits	Release date: February 24, 2004; Label: Capitol Nashville; Formats: CD, music download	11	112	3	US: Platinum
The Hits	Release date: November 4, 2015; Label: Laughter's Good Records; Formats: CD, music download	—	—	7	

=== Holiday albums ===
Title	Album details	Peak positions
Title	Album details	US Country
Make It Christmas	Release date: August 11, 2009; Label: Capitol Nashville; Formats: CD, music download	56

=== Live albums ===
Title	Album details
Live: C'mon Laugh You Bastards	Release date: October 19, 1999; Label: Rodney Carrington Records, Platinum Entertainment, Capitol Nashville; Formats: CD

=== Singles ===
Year	Single	Peak positions	Album
Year	Single	US Country	Album
1998	"Letter to My Penis"	—	Hangin' with Rodney
1999	"Dancin' with a Man"	—	Hangin' with Rodney
2000	"More of a Man"	71	Morning Wood
2003	"Don't Look Now"	60	Nut Sack
2007	"Show Them to Me"	—	King of the Mountains
2009	"If I'm the Only One"	—	El Niño Loco
2009	"Camouflage and Christmas Lights"	31	Make It Christmas
"—" denotes releases that did not chart

=== Music videos ===
Year	Video	Director
1998	"Dancin' with a Man"	Steven T. Miller/R. Brad Murano
1998	"Fred"	Steven T. Miller/R. Brad Murano
2000	"More of a Man"	
2009	"If I'm the Only One"	Nick Searcy
