= House Again =

2024 single by Hudson Westbrook

Single by Hudson Westbrook

from the album Texas Forever
- Released: February 24, 2025
- Recorded: 2024
- Studio: The Amber Sound (Nashville, Tennessee)
- Genre: Country
- Length: 3:23 (album version); 3:33 (radio edit)
- Label: Warner Music Nashville; River House Artists
- Songwriters: Hudson Westbrook; Dan Alley; Neil Medley
- Producers: Lukas Scott; Ryan Youmans

Hudson Westbrook singles chronology
"House Again" (2025)	"Painted You Pretty" (2026)

Music video
- "House Again" on YouTube

"House Again" is a song by American country music singer Hudson Westbrook. Initially released as a promotional single in October 2024, it was issued to country radio on February 24, 2025, as Westbrook's debut single and the first from his debut studio album, Texas Forever. It was written by Westbrook, Dan Alley and Neil Medley, and produced by Lukas Scott and Ryan Youmans.

== Background ==
Hudson Westbrook wrote music with Dan Alley and Neil Medley for the first time on June 4, 2024, at the River House office in Nashville, Tennessee, where all three were signed. Alley and Medley had never heard of Westbrook prior to working together. Westbrook had several ideas for a song which he discussed with Alley and Medley in a phone call the night before. They chose one about "a girl turning a house into a home". Medley and Alley had both written songs based on the concept and looked for a different angle they could explore, but the songwriters eventually built a story around the opposite idea (i.e. "a home that turned into a house again"), as Westbrook proposed. As Westbrook does routinely, they wrote it in chronological order. Westbrook took inspiration from his experience of seeing his parents divorce when he was seven years old. Throughout the process, acoustic guitars were strummed in the background. Medley and Alley let Westbrook sing in whatever melody was in his head at the moment. They recorded a very basic demo.

Westbrook experimented with the recording periodically in the following weeks. He slowed it down by about 10 beats per minute and stretched the word "now" in his singing, creating a melodic effect that mirrors the protagonist's lingering memories of his former lover. In September, Westbrook recorded the song at the Amber Sound, a studio co-owned by producer Ryan Youmans in the Hermitage neighborhood of Nashville. They developed it in a sound similar to "Blue Ain't Your Color" by Keith Urban, using bluesy triplets in tandem with a Hammond B-3 organ and gritty electric guitar. Youmans revised a chord near the end of the chorus from major to minor, heightening the self-pity expressed in the lyrics. The next day, Westbrook returned to River House, where he recorded the final version with co-producer Lukas Scott. They had singer Kaylin Roberson sing the harmonies to allude to the woman whom the song's character is thinking of.

Westbrook initially thought the song was too personal to appeal to people, but River House Vice President and General Manager Zebb Luster suggested he might be overthinking it. The song was released to streaming services on October 18 and amassed over 45 million streams on Spotify, leading to a record deal with Warner Music Nashville, which in a partnership with River House sent it to country radio via PlayMPE on February 24, 2025.

An alternate version of the song featuring Miranda Lambert was released on May 16, 2025, alongside Hudson's cover of Lambert's "The House That Built Me".

== Composition ==
The instrumental is built around electric guitar and organ, with a layer of scattered harmonies sung by a female voice. Lyrically, it finds the narrator in an empty house, as he thinks back to fond memories associated with the house when he lived in it with the woman that he has now broken up with. It starts with the recollection that the kitchen "used to be a dancehall", before proceeding through other parts of the house such as the bedroom, window, front door, porch swing and doorbell, all of which trigger memories of his ex. The narrator hears her voice echo in his mind and is haunted by his mistakes in the relationship. He pictures that she would be surprised if she ever came back to the house, as the atmosphere has completely changed.

== Commercial performance ==
"House Again" debuted at number 57 on the Billboard Country Airplay chart for the week ending March 22, 2025. The song peaked at number six for the week ending February 14, 2026. It also reached number one on the Mediabase country chart (becoming Westbrook's first number one). This is the third time where a song topped the Mediabase country chart while peaking outside the top five on the Country Airplay chart. The first was John Michael Montgomery's "I Miss You a Little" in 1997, and the second was Shania Twain's "From This Moment On" in 1998.

== Charts ==
=== Weekly charts ===
Weekly chart performance for "House Again"
Chart (2024–2026)	Peak position
Canada (Canadian Hot 100)	91
Canada Country (Billboard)	36
US Billboard Hot 100	33
US Country Airplay (Billboard)	6
US Hot Country Songs (Billboard)	10

=== Year-end charts ===
Year-end chart performance for "House Again"
Chart (2025)	Position
US Billboard Hot 100	95
US Country Airplay (Billboard)	57
US Hot Country Songs (Billboard)	17

== Certifications ==
Certifications for "House Again"
Region	Certification	Certified units/sales
Canada (Music Canada)	2× Platinum	160,000^{‡}
United States (RIAA)	2× Platinum	2,000,000^{‡}
^{‡} Sales+streaming figures based on certification alone.

== Release history ==
Region	Date	Format	Version	Label
United States	October 18, 2024	Digital download	Original	River House Artists
United States	February 24, 2025	Country radio	Original	Warner Music Nashville/River House Artists
United States	May 16, 2025	Digital download	Remix with Miranda Lambert	Warner Music Nashville/River House Artists
