= Good Little Girls (song) =

Single by Blue County

from the album Blue County
- Released: September 29, 2003
- Genre: Country
- Length: 3:01
- Label: Curb
- Songwriters: Troy Seals; Brett Jones
- Producers: Dann Huff; Doug Johnson

Blue County singles chronology
"Good Little Girls" (2003)	"That's Cool" (2004)

"Good Little Girls" is the debut song recorded by American country music duo Blue County. It was released in September 2003 as the first single from their debut album Blue County. The song was written by Troy Seals and Brett Jones.

== Chart performance ==
"Good Little Girls" debuted at number 51 on the U.S. Billboard Hot Country Songs chart for the week of October 18, 2003.

Chart (2003–2004)	Peak position
US Hot Country Songs (Billboard)	11
US Billboard Hot 100	63

=== Year-end charts ===
Chart (2004)	Position
US Country Songs (Billboard)	48
