= Blue County (duo) =

American country music duo

- Origin: Nashville, Tennessee, U.S.
- Genres: Country
- Years active: 2003–2007
- Labels: Curb
- Spinoff of: Aaron Jeoffrey
- Members: Aaron Benward; Scott Reeves

Blue County was an American country music duo composed of actor-singers Aaron Benward and Scott Reeves. They released their self-titled debut album in 2004 on Curb Records. This album produced four singles on the Billboard country singles charts, including the No. 11 "Good Little Girls". Two more singles — "Firecrackers and Ferris Wheels" and "I Get To" – were released in 2006, although neither was included on an album.

== History ==
Blue County was founded in 2003 by Aaron Benward (formerly of Aaron Jeoffrey) and actor-singer Scott Reeves, who had been friends for several years before the duo's foundation. Signed to Curb Records that year, the duo released their debut single "Good Little Girls". This single peaked at No. 11 on the Billboard country charts in early 2004, and was the first of four singles from their self-titled debut album, which Dann Huff produced. Also in 2004, the duo performed at the Country Music Association Music Festival.

Following "Good Little Girls" was the single "That's Cool", which peaked at No. 24 on the country charts. "Nothing but Cowboy Boots" and "That Summer Song" followed in 2005, peaking at No. 38 and No. 53 respectively. The duo released their fifth single, "Firecrackers and Ferris Wheels", in 2006, although it did not chart. Their final release for Curb was the No. 51-peaking "I Get To", which like "Firecrackers and Ferris Wheels" was never included on an album. After recording two songs for the soundtrack of the Evan Almighty comedic fantasy film, Blue County exited the Curb label in 2007.

== Discography ==
=== Studio albums ===
Title	Album details	Peak chart positions	
Title	Album details	US Country	US Heat
Blue County	Release date: April 6, 2004; Label: Curb Records; Formats: CD, music download	32	7

=== Singles ===
Year	Single	Peak chart positions		Album
Year	Single	US Country	US	Album
2003	"Good Little Girls"	11	63	Blue County
2004	"That's Cool"	24	—	Blue County
2004	"Nothin' but Cowboy Boots"	38	—	Blue County
2005	"That Summer Song"	53	—	Blue County
2006	"Firecrackers and Ferris Wheels"	—	—	—N/a
2006	"I Get To"	51	—	—N/a
"—" denotes releases that did not chart

=== Music videos ===
Year	Video	Director
2004	"Good Little Girls"	
2004	"That's Cool"	Kristin Barlowe
2006	"Firecrackers and Ferris Wheels"	Kristin Barlowe
