= Aaron Benward =

American singer-songwriter

- Birth name: Aaron Jeoffrey Benward
- Born: September 13, 1973 (age 51)
- Genres: Country, Christian music
- Occupation: Singer-songwriter,
- Years active: 2000–present
- Formerly of: Blue County, Aaron Jeoffrey

Aaron Jeoffrey Benward (born September 13, 1973) is an American Christian and country singer-songwriter.

== Life and career ==
Benward is the son of Candice and Jeoffrey Benward and has two siblings, Sareece and Colin. In high school, he left his mark as an All-State football, basketball and soccer player and was named the U.S. Army Scholar/Athlete of the Year. After graduating, he decided to pursue a college degree before getting involved in music on a professional level. He attended college on a soccer scholarship studying music business at Belmont University in Nashville, Tennessee.

In 1991, he surprised his father Jeoffrey when he told his dad that he wanted to follow his steps in the music business. They went on to form a unique son/father duo called Aaron Jeoffrey that achieved great success in the CCM scene. They garnered 10 #1 Billboard CCM singles and sold over 1,000,000 copies on all three of their EMI released albums combined.

Benward met his wife, Kenda, in San Jose, California, and married in 1994. In the late 1990s, Benward decided to pursue a solo career. While recording his first solo album, Benward, his wife and children, were involved in a near fatal car accident. After recovering from his injuries, Benward was able to release his debut album titled Imagine, that had Billboard #1 single called "Captured" in 2000.

Benward founded the country music duo Blue County with his friend Scott Reeves. Blue County recorded one album for Curb Records, which included the top 10 single "Good Little Girls" and the Top 20 hit "That's Cool", which Aaron co-wrote. Blue County was also nominated three times for CMA/ACM Duo of the Year. They participated as a featured artist in Conde Nast's/Chevrolet's Fashion Rocks campaign.

In 2023, Benward began producing a new Amazon Freevee docu-series, God. Family. Football.

== Other work ==
| Year | Label | Album | Artist | Song | Lyrics | | Music | |
| Year | Label | Album | Artist | Song | Credited | With | Credited | With |
|---|---|---|---|---|---|---|---|---|
| 2016 | SM Entertainment | Press It | Taemin | "Soldier" | No | Taemin | Yes | Matthew Tishler, Felicia Barton |

== See also ==
- Aaron Jeoffrey
- Luke Benward
