= Heiress Harris =

American child entertainer and social media personality

- Born: Heiress Diana Harris; March 26, 2016 (age 10); Atlanta, Georgia, U.S.
- Occupations: Child entertainer; singer; actress; entrepreneur
- Years active: 2018–present
- Parents: T.I. (father); Tameka Cottle (mother)
- Relatives: Zonnique Pullins (half-sister); Kid Saiyan (brother)

Heiress Diana Harris (born March 26, 2016) is an American child actress, singer, entrepreneur, and social media personality.

== Early life and family ==
In December 2015, Tameka Cottle announced that she was expecting her third child with T.I. Heiress Diana Harris was born on March 26, 2016 at Northside Hospital Atlanta in Atlanta, Georgia. She is the youngest of the Harris family's children. Her middle name, beginning with "D" was chosen by her mother as a tribute to honour Cottle's late brother Darren. Harris has two older siblings: her brother Clifford "King" Joseph Harris III, and Major Philant Harris.

== Career ==
=== Music ===
Harris began her music career at an early age and started vocal training when she was four years old. During her training sessions with vocal coach Annie Tracy, videos of Heiress singing gained public attention after she showed an ability to tell the difference between vibrato and straight-tone singing. Home recordings and viral clips of Heiress performing covers among them the Jackson 5's "Who's Lovin' You" and Xscape's "Who Can I Run To" generated wide circulation on social media.

In 2023, Harris served as the leading vocalist for the Essence Children’s Choir during the 2023 Essence Holiday Special. Which aired on November 24 and featured performances from several artists, including Kim Burrell and Jacquees. During show, Harris performed the holiday song "What Does Christmas Mean to You" alongside the choir. That same year during the 20th-anniversary concert for T.I. second studio album Trap Muzik, Harris was brought onstage during a performance of "Live Your Life". The concert was held at Atlanta Symphony Hall. During the performance, Heiress performed the chorus originally sang by Rihanna.

In 2024 she collaborated with child rapper VanVan on two singles, "Be You" and "Christmas Wake Up". She has also appeared in her father's music video for the song "What It's Come To," alongside her siblings. At the 2024 BET Awards ceremony, held on June 30 in Los Angeles, Harris performed her single "Be You" live on stage alongside VanVan.

On May 19, 2026, Harris received her third nomination for the BET Awards Young Stars Award for International Young Artist.

=== Acting ===
Heiress made her acting debut in the BET+ holiday film The Day Before Christmas (2024). She also appeared in an episode of BET's The Ms. Pat Show.

In 2025, she was cast in the NBC drama series Grosse Pointe Garden Society, portraying a character named Addie, the daughter of characters played by Jocko Sims and Aja Naomi King.

== Other ventures ==
=== Business ventures ===
Harris was linked to The Royal Collection by Heiress Harris, a range of nail polish products made especially for kids through a partnership with Piggy Paint in 2018. The products was endorsed by Tameka Cottle, and it was said to be nontoxic and suitable for kids.

== Discography ==
=== Singles ===
Singles as lead artist or featured artist
Year	Title	Artist(s)	Album
2023	"What Does Christmas Mean to You"	Heiress Harris	Non-album single
2024	"Be You"	Van Van (with Heiress Harris)	Non-album single
2024	"Christmas Wake Up"	Van Van (with Heiress Harris)	Non-album single
2024	"Be You (Remix)"	(with Heiress Harris and That Girl Lay Lay)	Non-album single
2025	"Dear Santa"	Heiress Harris	Non-album single
2026	"In the Wind"	Heiress Harris	Non-album single
2026	"That's My Bestie"	VanVan (feat. Heiress Harris)	Non-album single

== Filmography ==
=== Film ===
Year	Title	Role	Network / Distributor	Notes
2024	The Day Before Christmas	Ava	BET+	Film debut

=== Television ===
Year(s)	Title	Role	Network
2018–2021	T.I. & Tiny: Friends & Family Hustle	Herself	VH1
2025	The Ms. Pat Show	Shirley	BET+
2025	Grosse Pointe Garden Society	Addie	NBC / Peacock

== Live performances ==
=== Music festivals ===
Event	Date	City	Country	Venue	Performed song(s)
Trap Muzik 20th-anniversary concert	2023	Atlanta	United States	Atlanta Symphony Hall	Live Your Life

=== Award shows ===
Event	Date	City	Country	Performed song(s)
BET Awards 2024	March 2, 2025	Los Angeles	United States	"Be You" live on stage alongside VanVan

== Awards and nominations ==
Awards and nominations for Heiress Harris
Year	Award	Category	Result	Ref.
2024	BET Awards	Young Stars Award	Nominated	
2025	BET Awards	Young Stars Award	Nominated	
2026	BET Awards	Young Stars Award	Pending	
