= Kill the King (album) =

Studio album by T.I.
- Released: June 26, 2026
- Recorded: 2021–2026
- Length: 51:11
- Labels: Grand Hustle; Empire
- Producers: B100; Bans; Big Oomp; Crazy Mike; DeCastro; Dem Jointz; DJ Montay; DJ Toomp; Dr. Dre; The-Dream; FlexOnDaTrack; Go Grizzly; Fanatic; Juicy J; KeepItPhilthy; Major Seven; Jared McGriff; Mr. Hanky; Organized Noize; SquatBeatz; T.I.; Turbo; Unknwn; Villa Nova; Pharrell Williams; Young Fyre

T.I. chronology
The L.I.B.R.A. (2020)	Kill the King (2026)

Singles from Kill the King
- 1. "LLOGCLAY" Released: May 10, 2024; 2. "Let 'Em Know" Released: January 18, 2026; 3. "Trauma Bond" Released: March 20, 2026; 4. "Mr. Him" Released: May 7, 2026

Kill the King (stylized in all caps) is the twelfth and final studio album by American rapper T.I. It was released on June 26, 2026, through Grand Hustle Records and Empire Distribution.

== Background ==
On May 20, 2021, T.I. released a lyric video for his song, "What It's Come To". At the end of the visuals, it is revealed that T.I.'s working on his "final album", unveiling Kill the King as the album's title. In a message, T.I. said that the follow-up to his 2020 effort The L.I.B.R.A. is "coming soon". T.I. had been hinting at retirement as far back as 2017, when he appeared on The Breakfast Club radio show, and spoke about his plans to leave the music industry:

"I'm ready to get the hell outta here, though. I got, like, two, I got, this next album and two, I got three more albums in my head, conceptualized. Once I get them out, I'm done. [ Jeezy album? ] We're still doing it. ... [The next albums?] The next one is more like trap music. It's Trap Muzik 2017. And the one after that, it's gonna be more like a, uh, love as it pertains to a dope boy. And the one after that, that's my final album. It's called Kill the King. The last album is Kill the King. Simply because ever since my first album, I've put the title of 'King of the South' on me and to make yourself the king is to make you a target. And in chess, the object is to kill the king. So Kill the King is the title of my last album. Will they kill him or will he ride into the sunset happily ever after?"

The following year, in 2018 T.I. went on to release his tenth studio album, Dime Trap. In 2020, he issued The L.I.B.R.A., meaning Kill the King would be right on track to be his third, and final, project since 2017. The song "What It's Come To", which was released as a single in promotion for the album, addresses allegations against him and his wife Tiny, who appears in the video for the song alongside T.I.

In September 2021, T.I. was interviewed on the Big Facts Podcast, where he addressed allegations against him and maintained that Kill the King is still due to be his last album: "I don't care enough," he admits. "I just don't care about the same shit other muthafuckers out there care about...At this point. It did at one time. When I went to prison and came home, I learned what the fuck was important."

In February 2023, T.I. further elaborated on the title of the album: "I feel like the King of the South moniker is very egotistical, self-gratuitous and it's a persona that kinda enters the room before I do physically. Big Boi cautioned me of [the title] back when I was coming onto the scene," T.I. recalled to TMZ. "Big Boi said, 'It sounds cool. I like it, but understand when you are king you put a big bullseye on your back. You can't look for no favors. Life is a game of chess, and the name of the game is called Kill the King. That's what you are setting yourself up for.' [At the age] I didn't really think much of it. Let 'Em Know is the first single of the album which was released on January 18, 2026".

== Track listing ==
Kill the King track listing
No.	Title	Writer(s)	Producer(s)	Length
1.	"A King's Thought" (featuring Heiress Harris)	Terius Gesteelde-Diamant	T.I.; The-Dream; EveryBodyKnowStroud^{[v]}; Tameka "Tiny" Harris^{[v]}	0:40
2.	"See Wha'am Sayin"	Clifford Harris; Aldrin Davis; D'Juan Hart	DJ Toomp	2:56
3.	"Let 'Em Know"	Harris; Pharrell Williams	Williams	2:55
4.	"Where I'm From" (featuring Anderson .Paak)	Harris; Dwayne Abernathy Jr.; Brandon Anderson; Jon Freeman; Cristina Gallo; Sly Jordan; Brandon Perry; Candice Pillay; Varick Smith; Andre Young	Dem Jointz; Dr. Dre	3:45
5.	"Rant"	Harris; Filiberto Araiza; Brandon Lamela; Eddie Robinson	KeepItPhilthy; Villa Nova	3:36
6.	"Mr. Him"	Harris; Williams	Williams	2:25
7.	"How It Went" (featuring The-Dream)	Harris; Davis; Gesteelde-Diamant	DJ Toomp	3:14
8.	"Dope Boys Academy" (featuring T-Pain, Jeezy, and 2 Chainz)	Harris; Tauheed Epps; Jay Jenkins; Faheem Najm	Big Oomp; DJ Montay; Jared McGriff	2:56
9.	"Pistol on the Dance Floor"	Harris; Corey Dennard; Keith Sweat	Mr. Hanky	2:36
10.	"And Won't" (featuring Summer Walker)	Harris; Brandon Greene; Julian Johnson; Tevin Mcguire	B100; Go Grizzly; SquatBeatz	3:14
11.	"Gorgeous" (featuring Usher)	Harris; Curtis Eugene; Usher Raymond IV; Jason White; Nicholaus Williams; Tramaine Winfrey	Young Fyre; Ben "Bengineer" Chang^{[v]}	3:06
12.	"We On"	Harris; Chandler Great	Turbo	2:57
13.	"Llogclay" (featuring YoungBoy Never Broke Again)	Harris; Kentrell Gaulden	Bans; DeCastro; FlexOnDaTrack	3:39
14.	"Ego" (featuring the OMG Girlz)	Harris; Phil Chang; Omar Walker	Major Seven; Unkwn; EveryBodyKnowStroud^{[v]}	1:25
15.	"Trauma Bond" (featuring Marching Crimson Pipers)	Harris; Christopher Barriere; Corey Dennard; Marcus Edwards; Kenneth Moore; Milton Powell; Sylvester Stewart	Mr. Hanky	2:40
16.	"Represent a Time" (featuring Sweata and Young Dro)	Harris; Patrick Brown; Levens Jean; Ray Murray	Organized Noize	3:25
17.	"Big Dog" (featuring Buddy Red and EJ Jones)	Harris; Andreao Heard	Fanatic; Kawan Prather^{[a]}; EveryBodyKnowStroud^{[v]}	2:32
18.	"Continental"	Harris; Jordan Houston III	Crazy Mike; Juicy J	3:02
Total length:				51:11

=== Note ===
- ^{^[a]} indicates an assistant producer
- ^{^[v]} indicates a vocal producer

== Personnel ==
Credits are adapted from Tidal.

=== Musicians ===
- T.I. – vocals
- Heiress Harris – vocals (track 1)
- Young Dro – vocals (2, 3)
- Ali Jamieson – keyboards, programming, vocals (3, 6)
- Brendan Reilly – keyboards, programming, vocals (3, 6)
- Hal Ritson – keyboards, programming, vocals (3, 6)
- Miriam Stockley – keyboards, programming, vocals (3, 6)
- Richard Adlam – keyboards, programming, vocals (3, 6)
- Jerry "Jay Flat" Williams – flute, saxophone (4)
- Curt Chambers – guitar (4)
- Chris Johnson – trombone (4)
- Chris Lowery – trumpet (4)
- Stalone – vocals (4)
- EveryBodyKnowStroud – keyboards (7)
- J. Rivera – vocals (10)
- Jamel Hawkins Jr. – vocals (10)
- Jewel Hawkins – vocals (10)
- Bahja Rodriguez – vocals (14)
- Breaunna Womack – vocals (14)
- Zonnique Pullins – vocals (14)
- Terrace "Scar" Smith – background vocals (16)
- Chanz Parkman – keyboards (16)
- Lavell Crump – vocals (16)
- Billie Lennox – bass, programming (17)
- Buddy Red – guitar (17)
- Sherrod Barnes – guitar (17)
- Kawan Prather – programming (17)

=== Technical ===
- Irv Johnson – engineering (1–14, 16–18), mixing (3, 15)
- Nikki Hughes – engineering (1)
- Ricardo Sanchez – engineering (2, 4), recording (7, 16, 17)
- Jayo – mixing, recording (1)
- Armani Alejandro George – engineering (7)
- Nicholas van Kampen – engineering (16), mixing (12)
- Elliott Carter – mixing (1, 7, 12, 13), recording (2, 4, 5, 8–11, 15–17)
- Leslie Brathwaite – mixing (2, 3, 5, 6, 8–11, 14–18)
- Mike Larson – mixing (3, 6)
- Pharrell Williams – mixing (3, 6)
- Dr. Dre – mixing (4)
- Finis "KY" White – mixing (8)
- Dave Kutch – mastering
- Brian "Big Bass" Gardner – mastering (4)
- Benjamin Thomas – recording (3, 6)
- Quentin "Q" Gilkey – recording (4)
- Cee Copeland – recording (8)
- Faheem Najm – recording (8)
- Nolan Presley – recording (8)
- Brendon Exler – recording (10, 12)
- Chris Pestello – recording (10)
- David Bishop – recording (10)
- Ben "Bengineer" Chang – recording (11)
- Teddrick Palmer – recording (13)
- EveryBodyKnowStroud – recording (14, 17)
- Renegade El Rey – recording (16)
- Randy Warken – recording (18)

== Charts ==
Chart performance for Kill the King
Chart (2026)	Peak position
UK Album Downloads (Official Charts)	44
US Billboard 200	30
US Independent Albums (Billboard)	4
US Top R&B/Hip-Hop Albums (Billboard)	10
