= Wild 'n Out =

American sketch comedy and improv game show television series

- Also known as: Nick Cannon Presents: Wild 'n Out
- Genre: Comedy; Game show; Improv
- Created by: Nick Cannon
- Starring: Nick Cannon
- Country of origin: United States
- Original language: English
- No. of seasons: 22
- No. of episodes: 414

Production
- Executive producers: Candida Boyette-Clemons; Michael Goldman; Nick Cannon; Paul Ricci
- Running time: 30 minutes
- Production companies: Mr. Renassiance Entertainment (Seasons 1–4); The Collective (Seasons 1–4); Ncredible Entertainment (Season 5–present); MTV Entertainment Studios (Season 16–present)

Original release
- Network: MTV (Seasons 1–4, 8–13); MTV2 (Seasons 5–7); VH1 (Seasons 13–present)
- Release: July 28, 2005 – September 6, 2007
- Release: July 9, 2013 – present

Wild 'n Out, also known as Nick Cannon Presents: Wild 'n Out, is an American sketch comedy and battle rap improv game show television series created and hosted by musician and comedian Nick Cannon currently airing on VH1. It debuted on July 28, 2005, on MTV.

== Premise ==
Similar in premise to shows such as Whose Line Is It Anyway?, the series puts two teams of comedians against each other in a series of Wild 'n Out games which are all basically "improvisational" comedy games. The Teams are the "Red Squad", which was the team name until Season 5 where they became the "Platinum Squad" and were permanently captained by Cannon; and the "Black Squad", led by a celebrity guest until Season 7 where the situation was reversed with Cannon becoming the Black Squad team captain and the celebrity guest leading the Platinum Squad.

For Season 8, the colors were revamped once again with the Gold Squad replacing the Black Squad. The Gold Squad was led by Cannon while the celebrity guest remained captain of the Platinum Squad. For Seasons 9–14, Cannon led his original Red Squad team color while the Black Squad team color returned also.

For Season 15, the teams were revamped as Nick Cannon leads the Old School team, comprising older cast members and a legendary special guest, and cast member DC Young Fly and the celebrity guest lead the New School Team, comprising some newer cast members.

For Season 16, the teams changed once again. In a format similar to Old School vs New School, Nick Cannon leads Team Revolution and the celebrity guest, appearing as a hologram, leads Team Evolution.

For Seasons 17–19, the teams were reverted to the "Old School" vs. "New School" format. Nick Cannon and a legendary special guest leads the "Old School" team, and the celebrity guest lead the "New School" team. This would also be the format for Season 21.

For Season 20, it reverted to the original "Red Team vs Black Team" format, where Nick Cannon leads the Red Team and the Black Team is led by the celebrity guest.

After three such games, the two teams square off against each other in the final round of the game called 'WildStyle', in which they must deliver a punchline directed at their opponent's team member(s) within a freestyle rap. The comedians "beef" with each other; however, some are impersonal jokes. Although similar to Whose Line, the "points don't matter", the teams score one point per round victory during the normal rounds, plus one point per favorably judged punchline during 'Wild Style', which makes it similar in format to the improv show ComedySportz.

Each episode also includes a musical performance, occasionally by the guest captain for the Black/Platinum Squad (Nick Cannon performed with Migos in Season 6 in the episode featuring Chanel Iman). At times, the musical guest comes out just before 'Wild Style' as the judge for the beefs. Starting with Season 2, the teams now compete for a "Wild 'N Out" Championship belt (Million Dollar Chain in Seasons 16 and 17). If the celebrity guest team wins, the team captain gets to take home the belt but if Cannon's team wins, he gets to keep the belt.

== Production ==
In November 2012, it was announced that the series would be returning in 2013 after a six-year hiatus. The revival features celebrities, along with the show's current cast. The fifth season premiered on MTV2 to 1.1 million total viewers, making it the highest-rated telecast in the network's history. The show would continue on MTV2 for three seasons.

On June 9, 2016, Wild 'N Out was renewed for an eighth season, which would mark the series' return to MTV. The season premiered on August 4, 2016.

In April 2019, the series was renewed through Season 16. On June 19, 2019, it was announced that Wild 'N Out would expand to VH1, with a special Summer season premiering on July 7, 2019.

== Cast ==
| Cast member | Seasons | | | | | | | | | | | | | | | | | | | | |
| Cast member | 1 | 2 | 3 | 4 | 5 | 6 | 7 | 8 | 9 | 10 | 11 | 12 | 13 | 14 | 15 | 16 | 17 | 18 | 19 | 20 | 21 |
|---|---|---|---|---|---|---|---|---|---|---|---|---|---|---|---|---|---|---|---|---|---|
| Nick Cannon | Starring | Starring | Starring | Starring | Starring | Starring | Starring | Starring | Starring | Starring | Starring | Starring | Starring | Starring | Starring | Starring | Starring | Starring | Starring | Starring | Starring |
| DJ D-Wrek | Starring | Starring | Starring | Starring | Starring | Starring | Starring | Starring | Starring | Starring | Starring | Starring | Starring | Starring | Starring | Starring | Starring | Starring | Starring | Starring | Starring |
| DeRay Davis | Starring | Starring | Starring | Starring | Starring | Starring | Starring | Starring | Starring | Starring | | | | | Starring | Starring | Starring | Starring | | Starring | |
| Spanky Hayes | Starring | Starring | Starring | Starring | Starring | Starring | | | | | | | | | Starring | | | | | | |
| Mikey Day | Starring | Starring | Starring | Starring | Starring | Starring | | | | | Guest | | | | | | | | | | |
| Rasika Mathur | Starring | Starring | Starring | Starring | Starring | | | | | Guest | | | | | Starring | | | | | | |
| Rob Hoffman | Starring | Starring | Starring | Starring | | | | | | | | | | | Starring | | | | | | |
| Affion Crockett | Starring | Starring | Starring | Starring | | | | | | | Guest | | | | Starring | | | | | | |
| Leonard Robinson | Starring | Starring | Starring | Starring | | | | | | | | | | | | | | | | | |
| Nyima Funk | Starring | Starring | Starring | | | | | | | | | | | | Starring | | | | | | |
| Katt Williams | Starring | Starring | Starring | Starring | | | | | | | | | | | | | | | | | |
| Joshua Funk | Starring | | Starring | | | | | | | | | | | | | | | | | | |
| Alanna Ubach | Starring | | | | | | | | | | | | | | | | | | | | |
| Darrel Heath | Starring | | | | | | | | | | | | | | | | | | | | |
| Gene Hong | Starring | | | | | | | | | | | | | | | | | | | | |
| Corey Holcomb | | Starring | Starring | Starring | Starring | Starring | Starring | Starring | | | | | | | | | | | | | |
| Cameron Goodman | | Starring | Starring | | | | | | | | | | | | | | | | | | |
| Scruncho | | Starring | | | | | | | | | | | | | Starring | | | | | | |
| Christine Lakin | | Starring | | | | | | | | | | | | | | | | | | | |
| Dominique | | Starring | | | | | | | | | | | | | | | | | | | |
| Nic Nac | | Starring | | | | | | | | | | | | | | | | | | | |
| Shenika Williams | | Starring | | | | | | | | | | | | | | | | | | | |
| Shawty Shawty | | | Starring | Starring | | Starring | Starring | | | | | | Starring | | Starring | | | Guest | Guest | | |
| Marques Ray | | | Starring | Starring | | | | | | | | | | | | | | | | | |
| Randall Park | | | Starring | Starring | | | | | | | | | | | | | | | | | |
| Taran Killam | | | Starring | Starring | | | | | | | | | | | | | | | | | |
| Benji Brown | | | | Starring | | | | | | | | | | | | | | | | | |
| Biz Markie | | | | Starring | | | | | | | | | | | | | | | | | |
| Brandon T. Jackson | | | | Starring | | | | | | | | | | | | | | | | | |
| Cipha Sounds | | | | Starring | | | | | | | | | | | | | | | | | |
| Deon Cole | | | | Starring | | | | | | | | | | | | | | | | | |
| Guy Torry | | | | Starring | | | | | | | | | | | | | | | | | |
| Jackie Long | | | | Starring | | | | | | | | | | | | | | | | | |
| Jeff Ross | | | | Starring | | | | | | | | | | | | | | | | | |
| John Brown | | | | Starring | | | | | | | | | | | | | | | | | |
| Kevin Hart | | | | Starring | | | | | | | | | | | | | | | | | |
| Lil G | | | | Starring | | | | | | | | | | | | | | | | | |
| Loni Love | | | | Starring | | | | | | | | | | | | | | | | | |
| Luenell | | | | Starring | | | | | | | | | | | | | | | | | |
| Porscha Coleman | | | | Starring | | | | | | | | | | | | | | | | | |
| Rodman | | | | Starring | | | | | | | | | | | | | | | | | |
| Shamrock | | | | Starring | | | | | | | | | | | | | | | | | |
| TK Kirkland | | | | Starring | | | | | | | | | | | | | | | | | |
| Conceited | | | | | Starring | Starring | Starring | Starring | Starring | Starring | Starring | Starring | Starring | Starring | Starring | Starring | Starring | Starring | Starring | Starring | Starring |
| Chico Bean | | | | | Starring | Starring | Starring | Starring | Starring | Starring | Starring | Starring | Starring | Starring | Starring | Starring | Starring | Starring | Starring | Starring | Starring |
| Emmanuel Hudson | | | | | Starring | Starring | Starring | Starring | Starring | Starring | Starring | Starring | Starring | Starring | Starring | Starring | Starring | Starring | Starring | Starring | Starring |
| Karlous Miller | | | | | Starring | Starring | Starring | Starring | Starring | Starring | Starring | Starring | Starring | Starring | Starring | Starring | Starring | Starring | Starring | Starring | Starring |
| Jacob Williams | | | | | Starring | Starring | Starring | Starring | Starring | Starring | Starring | Starring | | | Starring | Starring | Starring | | | Starring | |
| Timothy DeLaGhetto | | | | | Starring | Starring | Starring | Starring | Starring | Starring | Starring | Starring | | | Starring | Starring | Starring | | | Starring | |
| Jack Thriller | | | | | Starring | Starring | Starring | Starring | | | | | | | | Starring | Starring | Starring | | Starring | |
| DoBoy | | | | | Starring | Starring | Starring | Starring | | | | | | | Starring | | | | | | |
| Lauren Flans | | | | | Starring | Starring | Starring | | | | | | | | Starring | | | | | | |
| James Davis | | | | | Starring | Starring | Starring | | | | | Guest | | | Starring | | Guest | | | Starring | |
| Pete Davidson | | | | | Starring | Starring | | | | | | | | | | | | | | | |
| Chaunté Wayans | | | | | Starring | Starring | | | | | | | | | | | | | | | |
| Hitman Holla | | | | | | Starring | Starring | Starring | Starring | Starring | Starring | Starring | Starring | Starring | Starring | Starring | Guest | Starring | Starring | Starring | Starring |
| Rip Micheals | | | | | | Starring | Starring | Starring | Starring | Starring | Starring | Starring | Starring | Starring | Starring | Starring | Starring | Starring | Starring | Starring | Starring |
| Jon Gabrus | | | | | | Starring | Starring | Starring | | | | | | | Starring | | | | | | |
| Blair Christian | | | | | | Starring | Starring | Starring | | | | | | | | | | | | | |
| Kojo | | | | | | Starring | Starring | | | | | | | | | | | | | | |
| King Bach | | | | | | Starring | Starring | | | | | | | | | | | | | | |
| Shakir Standley | | | | | | Starring | Starring | | | | | | | | | | | | | | |
| Akaash Singh | | | | | | Starring | Starring | | | | | | | | | | | | | | |
| Esther Ku | | | | | | Starring | | | | | | | | | | | | | | | |
| Natasha Rothwell | | | | | | Starring | | | | | | | | | | | | | | | |
| DC Young Fly | | | | | | | Starring | Starring | Starring | Starring | Starring | Starring | Starring | Starring | Starring | Starring | Starring | Starring | Starring | Starring | Starring |
| Darren Brand | | | | | | | Starring | Starring | Starring | Starring | Starring | Starring | | | Starring | | | | | Starring | |
| Matt Rife | | | | | | | Starring | Starring | Starring | | | | | | Starring | | | | | Starring | |
| B-Daht | | | | | | | Starring | Starring | Starring | | | | | | Starring | | | | | | |
| Aarona Lopez | | | | | | | Starring | | | | | | | | | | | | | | |
| Hunter Steibel | | | | | | | Starring | | | | | | | | | | | | | | |
| Rosa Acosta | | | | | | | Starring | | | | | | | | | | | | | | |
| Charlie Clips | | | | | | | | Starring | Starring | Starring | Starring | Starring | Starring | Starring | Starring | Starring | | Starring | Starring | Starring | Starring |
| Justina Valentine | | | | | | | | Starring | Starring | Starring | Starring | Starring | Starring | Starring | Starring | Starring | Starring | Starring | Starring | Starring | Starring |
| Michael Blackson | | | | | | | | Starring | | Starring | | Starring | | | | Starring | | | | Guest | |
| Tonio Skits | | | | | | | | Starring | Starring | Starring | Starring | | | | | | | | | | Guest |
| Billy Sorrells | | | | | | | | Starring | | | | | | Starring | | | | | | | |
| Burpie | | | | | | | | Starring | | | | | | | Starring | | | | | | |
| Becky "Pickles" Robinson | | | | | | | | Starring | | | | | | | | | | | | | |
| Cynthia LuCiette | | | | | | | | Starring | | | | | | | | | | | | | |
| Elgin "Davisito" David | | | | | | | | Starring | | | | | | | | | | | | | |
| Nate Jackson | | | | | | | | Starring | | | | | | | | | | | | | |
| Ross Bryant | | | | | | | | Starring | | | | | | | | | | | | | |
| Teddy Ray | | | | | | | | Starring | | | | | | | | | | | | | |
| Corey Charron | | | | | | | | | Starring | Starring | Starring | Starring | Starring | Starring | Starring | | Starring | Starring | | Starring | |
| Jess Hilarious | | | | | | | | | Starring | Starring | | | | | Starring | Starring | Starring | Starring | Starring | Starring | |
| B. Simone | | | | | | | | | Starring | | Starring | Starring | Starring | Starring | Starring | Starring | | Starring | Starring | Starring | Starring |
| Bonnie Godiva | | | | | | | | | Starring | | | | | | | | | | | | |
| Cristian Oliveras | | | | | | | | | Starring | | | | | | | | | | | | |
| Dewayne Perkins | | | | | | | | | Starring | | | | | | | | | | | | |
| Leonard Ouzts | | | | | | | | | Starring | | | | | | | | | | | | |
| Lil Freckles | | | | | | | | | Starring | | | | | | | | | | | | |
| Reggie COUZ | | | | | | | | | Starring | | | | | | | | | | | | |
| Summerella | | | | | | | | | Starring | | | | | | | | | | | | |
| Julia Young | | | | | | | | | | Starring | Starring | Starring | | | | | | | | | |
| Royce Bell | | | | | | | | | | Starring | Starring | Starring | Starring | | Starring | | | | | Starring | |
| E-Money | | | | | | | | | | Starring | | | | | | | | | | | |
| Bobb'e J. Thompson | | | | | | | | | | | Starring | Starring | Starring | Starring | Starring | Starring | Starring | Starring | Starring | Starring | Starring |
| Yvng Swag | | | | | | | | | | | Starring | Starring | Starring | Starring | Starring | Starring | Starring | | Starring | Starring | |
| Vena "Pretty Vee" E. | | | | | | | | | | | Starring | Starring | Starring | Starring | Starring | Starring | | Starring | Starring | Starring | Starring |
| Jason Lee | | | | | | | | | | | Starring | Starring | Starring | Starring | | | | | | Starring | |
| Dan Rue | | | | | | | | | | | Starring | Starring | Starring | | | | | | | | |
| Funny Mike | | | | | | | | | | | Starring | Starring | | | | | | | | | |
| Renny | | | | | | | | | | | Starring | Starring | | | | | | | | | |
| Zoie | | | | | | | | | | | Starring | Starring | | | | | | | | | |
| ARNSTAR | | | | | | | | | | | Starring | | | | | | | | | | |
| NickNack PattiWhack | | | | | | | | | | | Starring | | | | | | | | | | |
| Pio | | | | | | | | | | | Starring | | | | | | | | | | |
| Radio Big Mack | | | | | | | | | | | | Starring | Starring | Starring | Starring | Starring | Starring | Starring | Starring | Starring | Starring |
| Cortez Macklin | | | | | | | | | | | | Starring | Starring | Starring | Starring | Starring | Starring | Starring | Starring | Starring | |
| Big JJ | | | | | | | | | | | | Starring | Starring | Starring | Starring | Starring | Starring | Starring | | Starring | |
| Tyler Chronicles | | | | | | | | | | | | Starring | Starring | Starring | Starring | Starring | | | Starring | Starring | Starring |
| Mope Williams | | | | | | | | | | | | Starring | Starring | Starring | Starring | | | | | Starring | |
| Teresa Topnotch | | | | | | | | | | | | Starring | Starring | Starring | Starring | | | | | | |
| Watts Homie Quan | | | | | | | | | | | | Starring | Starring | Starring | Starring | | | | | | |
| Clayton English | | | | | | | | | | | | Starring | Starring | | | | | | | | |
| Jay Will as Kandie | | | | | | | | | | | | Starring | | | | Starring | Starring | Starring | Starring | | |
| Hi My Name's Tee | | | | | | | | | | | | Starring | | | | | | | | | |
| Venk Potula | | | | | | | | | | | | Starring | | | | | | | | | |
| Retro Spectro | | | | | | | | | | | | Starring | | | | | | | | | |
| ItsLovelyMimi | | | | | | | | | | | | | Starring | Starring | Starring | Starring | Starring | Starring | Starring | Starring | Starring |
| King Cannon | | | | | | | | | | | | | Starring | Starring | Starring | Starring | | | | | Starring |
| Christian Perfas | | | | | | | | | | | | | Starring | | | | | | | | |
| MyVerse | | | | | | | | | | | | | Starring | | | | | | | | |
| RiceGum | | | | | | | | | | | | | Starring | | | | | | | | |
| Maddy Smith | | | | | | | | | | | | | | Starring | Starring | Starring | Starring | Starring | Starring | Starring | Starring |
| Santwon McCray | | | | | | | | | | | | | | Starring | Starring | Starring | Starring | Starring | Starring | Starring | Starring |
| Amber Diamond | | | | | | | | | | | | | | Starring | Starring | Starring | Starring | | | | |
| Jay Cole | | | | | | | | | | | | | | Starring | Starring | Starring | | | | | |
| Shuler King | | | | | | | | | | | | | | Starring | Starring | Starring | | | | | |
| Carter Deems | | | | | | | | | | | | | | Starring | Starring | | | | | | |
| MC Jin | | | | | | | | | | | | | | Starring | Starring | | | | | | |
| King Los | | | | | | | | | | | | | | Starring | | | | | | | |
| Infared Fred | | | | | | | | | | | | | | Starring | | | | | | | |
| Aida Goitom | | | | | | | | | | | | | | Starring | | | | | | | |
| David Shine | | | | | | | | | | | | | | Starring | | | | | | | |
| Teddy Mora | | | | | | | | | | | | | | | Starring | Starring | Starring | Starring | Starring | Starring | |
| Jessie Woo | | | | | | | | | | | | | | | | Starring | Starring | Starring | Starring | Starring | Starring |
| Brent Pella | | | | | | | | | | | | | | | | Starring | Starring | Starring | | Starring | |
| Godfrey | | | | | | | | | | | | | | | | Starring | Starring | Starring | | | |
| Courtney Bee | | | | | | | | | | | | | | | | | | Starring | Starring | Starring | Starring |
| FatsDaBarber | | | | | | | | | | | | | | | | | | Starring | Starring | Starring | Starring |
| Kosha Dillz | | | | | | | | | | | | | | | | | | Starring | Starring | Starring | Starring |
| Or Mash | | | | | | | | | | | | | | | | | | Starring | Starring | Starring | Starring |
| Phillip Hudson | | | | | | | | | | | | | | | | | | Starring | Starring | Starring | Starring |
| Thatboyfunny | | | | | | | | | | | | | | | | | | Starring | Starring | Starring | Starring |
| C. King | | | | | | | | | | | | | | | | | | | Starring | Starring | Starring |
| J. Snow | | | | | | | | | | | | | | | | | | | Starring | | |
| Mike Ruga | | | | | | | | | | | | | | | | | | | Starring | Starring | |
| Morgan Jay | | | | | | | | | | | | | | | | | | | Starring | Starring | Starring |
| Mr. Clank Clank | | | | | | | | | | | | | | | | | | | Starring | Starring | |
| Sydney Castillo | | | | | | | | | | | | | | | | | | | Starring | | Starring |
| Asad Benbow | | | | | | | | | | | | | | | | | | | | | Starring |
| Christian Crosby | | | | | | | | | | | | | | | | | | | | | Starring |
| Eagle Witt | | | | | | | | | | | | | | | | | | | | | Starring |
| FamousAngel | | | | | | | | | | | | | | | | | | | | | Starring |
| Frak | | | | | | | | | | | | | | | | | | | | | Starring |
| Joey Dardano | | | | | | | | | | | | | | | | | | | | | Starring |
| Joey Ramaine | | | | | | | | | | | | | | | | | | | | | Starring |
| Look-A-Like | | | | | | | | | | | | | | | | | | | | | Starring |
| Lukas Arnold | | | | | | | | | | | | | | | | | | | | | Starring |
| Mojo Brookzz | | | | | | | | | | | | | | | | | | | | | Starring |
| Rynia Kando | | | | | | | | | | | | | | | | | | | | | Starring |
| Sydney Duncan | | | | | | | | | | | | | | | | | | | | | Starring |
| Vinny Guadagnino | | | | | | | | | | | | | | | | | | | | | Starring |

== Seasons ==
| Season | Episodes | Originally released | | |
| Season | Episodes | First released | Last released | Network |
|---|---|---|---|---|
| 1 | 10 | July 28, 2005 | September 29, 2005 | MTV |
| 2 | 10 | February 2, 2006 | April 6, 2006 | MTV |
| 3 | 8 | August 10, 2006 | October 5, 2006 | MTV |
| 4 | 20 | May 12, 2007 | September 6, 2007 | MTV |
| 5 | 12 | July 9, 2013 | September 24, 2013 | MTV2 |
| 6 | 16 | July 2, 2014 | February 4, 2015 | MTV2 |
| 7 | 16 | June 10, 2015 | January 6, 2016 | MTV2 |
| 8 | 21 | August 4, 2016 | April 20, 2017 | MTV |
| 9 | 16 | June 29, 2017 | November 9, 2017 | MTV |
| 10 | 16 | November 30, 2017 | March 22, 2018 | MTV |
| 11 | 21 | March 15, 2018 | September 29, 2019 | MTV |
| 12 | 26 | August 17, 2018 | April 23, 2019 | MTV |
| 13 | 26 | February 1, 2019 | September 15, 2019 | MTV/VH1 |
| 14 | 27 | August 17, 2019 | April 14, 2020 | MTV/VH1 |
| 15 | 26 | April 21, 2020 | May 4, 2021 | VH1 |
| 16 | 28 | August 10, 2021 | December 21, 2021 | VH1 |
| 17 | 29 | February 22, 2022 | May 3, 2022 | VH1 |
| 18 | 30 | June 21, 2022 | August 2, 2022 | VH1 |
| 19 | 26 | April 6, 2023 | June 29, 2023 | VH1 |
| 20 | 25 | July 23, 2023 | September 28, 2023 | VH1 |
| 21 | 30 | July 29, 2024 | November 3, 2025 | VH1 |
| 22 | TBA | 2026 | 2026 | VH1 |

Season 1 (2005)

- Orlando Jones/Cassidy/Biz Markie
- Christina Milian/Common
- Ying Yang Twins
- Kanye West/Tracee Ellis Ross
- Eva Marcille/T.I.
- Kenan Thompson/The Pussycat Dolls
- Fonzworth Bentley/Trillville
- Omarion/Lil Wayne
- Kevin Hart/David Banner
- Method Man/Lil Scrappy

Season 2 (2006)

The second season contains ten episodes which were broadcast from February 2 to April 6, 2006, on MTV.

- Lil Jon/Three 6 Mafia
- Tyra Banks/Sean Paul
- Cedric the Entertainer/Dem Franchise Boyz/Da Brat/Jermaine Dupri
- Marques Houston/Rhymefest/Kanye West/Bobby Brown
- Rev Run/Young Jeezy/Akon
- Kelly Rowland/Ne-Yo
- Mike Jones
- Charlie Murphy/Busta Rhymes
- Wayne Brady/Paul Wall
- Mike Epps/Joy Bryant/Pitbull

Season 3 (2006)

The third season contains eight episodes which were broadcast from August 10 to October 5, 2006, on MTV.

- Big Boi/Lil Jon/Purple Ribbon All Stars
- Fat Joe/Clipse/Pharrell Williams
- Andy Milonakis/Field Mob
- Warren Sapp/Method Man
- Jamie Kennedy/Chamillionaire
- E-40
- Ray J/Yung Joc
- Talib Kweli/Lupe Fiasco

Season 4 (2007)

The fourth season contains 20 episodes which were broadcast from May 12 to September 6, 2007, on MTV.

- Snoop Dogg
- Ne-Yo
- Lloyd
- Steve-O/Big Daddy Kane
- Fabolous
- Brooke Hogan/Three 6 Mafia
- Redman
- Swizz Beatz
- Tara Reid/Izzy Battle
- Young Buck
- Pauly Shore/The Fixxers
- Jim Jones
- Serena Williams/Crime Mob
- Common
- Terry Crews/Pretty Ricky
- Paula DeAnda/Baby Boy da Prince
- Big Boy/Mike Jones
- Sommore/DJ Unk
- Bruce Bruce/Paul Wall
- Katt Williams/Huey
- Lil Wyte

Season 5 (2013)

The fifth season contains 12 episodes which were broadcast from July 9 to September 24, 2013, on MTV2. This is the first season of the show to air since the fourth season in 2007.

- Kevin Hart/DJ Khaled
- Mac Miller
- 2 Chainz/Lil Duval
- Vinny Guadagnino/Mike Epps/Talib Kweli
- French Montana/Guy Code Cast
- A$AP Rocky
- Amar'e Stoudemire/Macklemore & Ryan Lewis
- Lil Duval/Charlamagne Tha God/Joey Bada$$
- Chanel West Coast/Pusha T
- Joe Budden/Big Boi
- MGK
- Kevin Hart/Kirko Bangz

Season 6 (2014–15)

The sixth season contains 16 episodes which were broadcast from July 2, 2014, to February 4, 2015, on MTV2.

- Rick Ross/MMG
- Nelly
- Skylar Diggins/Vic Mensa
- Bow Wow/Que
- Chrissy Teigen/PWD/Michael Strahan/Kaidence Waddle
- Austin Mahone
- RiFF RaFF
- Asher Roth/Drita D'Avanzo/Troy Ave
- Tech N9ne/MURS
- Amber Rose/Wiz Khalifa
- Brandon T. Jackson/Jim Jones/Wonder Broz/Sage the Gemini
- Maino/Yo Gotti/Rich Homie Quan
- Chanel Iman/Migos
- Peter Gunz/Angel Haze
- Sage the Gemini
- Adrien Broner/Yo Gotti/Rich Homie Quan

Season 7 (2015–16)

The seventh season contains 16 episodes which were broadcast from June 10, 2015, to January 6, 2016, on MTV2. There are also stand up specials after the episodes in this season are finished.

- Fabolous/Kevin Hart
- Rae Sremmurd
- T-Pain
- Pete Wentz/Fetty Wap
- Zendaya/Ne-Yo
- Nick Young/A-Town/Snacks/French Montana
- Ty Dolla $ign/IceJJFish
- Mack Wilds/DJ Drama/O.T. Genasis
- Dej Loaf
- A$AP Ferg/Hailey Clauson/Marty Baller
- Jordin Sparks/Snoop Dogg/Arsonal da Rebel
- Shaquille O'Neal/Migos
- Ray J/Lil Duval
- Remy Ma/The Breakfast Club/K Camp
- Tommy Lister/Conceited/Hitman Holla
- Fat Joe/Desus Nice/The Kid Mero

Season 8 (2016–17)

The eighth season contains 21 episodes which were broadcast from August 4, 2016, to April 20, 2017, on MTV, marking the first time in almost a decade that the show aired new episodes on its original network.

- Tyga/Scott Disick
- Iggy Azalea/Travis Mills
- Waka Flocka/Tate Kobang
- Travis Scott
- Bella Thorne/Jadakiss
- T.I./Young Dro
- Lil Dicky/Rachel Hilbert
- Keke Palmer/Erykah Badu/Mack Wilds/Curren$y
- Timbaland/Les Twins/Jay Leno/Lyfe Jennings/Kehlani
- Stevie J/Joseline Hernandez/Yo Gotti
- 2 Chainz
- K. Michelle/Antonio Cromartie/Flo Rida
- Trevor Jackson/DRAM
- Chris Paul/iLoveMemphis
- Samantha Hoopes/Russel Peters/Don Benjamin/Jeremih
- Trina
- Lil Bibby/Ta'Rhonda Jones/Dreezy
- Migos
- Faizon Love/2 Milly
- Deontay Wilder/Tory Lanez
- Omarion/Safaree

Season 9 (2017)

The ninth season contains 16 episodes which were broadcast from June 29 to October 5, 2017, on MTV.

- Chance the Rapper/Saba
- Vic Mensa/Method Man
- Dave East/Nev Schulman
- Lil Yachty
- Blac Chyna/ItsAMovie
- The Cast of the New Edition Story/Nick Grant
- Tami Roman/Lecrae
- Remy Ma/Papoose/Conceited/Hitman Holla
- Killer Mike/Run the Jewels
- Young M.A.
- Rick Ross/Slab/YesJulz
- Jake Miller/Shameik Moore
- Lil Rel Howery/Mia Kang/Ayo & Teo
- LeSean McCoy/SNS/Kid The Wiz/Todrick Hall
- DJ Self/Demaris Lewis/Kodie Shane
- Wendy Williams/Blac Youngsta/Cipha Sounds

Season 10 (2017–18)

The tenth season contains 16 episodes which were broadcast from November 30, 2017, to March 1, 2018, on MTV.

- Desiigner/Kranium
- Wu-Tang Clan
- Sereyah/Fatboy SSE
- Santa Claus/Slick Woods/Jacquees
- Pete Davidson/PnB Rock
- MGK/Sommer Ray
- Ayo & Teo
- Keyshia Cole/Smokepurpp
- Fabolous/Elijah Kelley
- The Combs Brothers
- Tee Grizzley
- Wyclef Jean/Sara Sampio
- KYLE/Sky
- Gary Owen/CyHi the Prynce/21 Savage
- A Boogie wit da Hoodie/Don Q/CyHi the Prynce
- A$AP Mob
- International Women's Day Special

Season 11 (2018–19)

The 11th season consists of 21 episodes and premiered on March 15, 2018, on MTV, two weeks after the end of Season 10, and concluded September 29, 2019, on VH1.

- All That Cast/Shameik Moore
- PRETTYMUCH/Nafessa Williams
- Laurie Hernandez/Yvng Swag
- Rick Ross/Slab
- Tyga
- T.I./Hustle Gang
- Keke Palmer/Vic Mensa
- Baby Ariel/BJ the Chicago Kid
- Dolph Ziggler/Rich the Kid
- Prince Royce/Shameik Moore
- Blac Youngsta/Cordell Broadus
- Amara LeNegra/Bobby Lytes/Derez De'Shon
- Winnie Harlow/Rapsody/Shameik Moore
- Rachel Lindsay/Vic Mensa/Kent Jones
- DreamDoll/Caroline Lowe/Roy Woods
- Matt Barnes/Mariah Lynn/Kap G
- Justine Skye/Vic Mensa
- Affion Crockett/Karlie Redd/Vic Mensa
- Mikey Day/Jack & Jack
- Trick Daddy/Famous Dex
- Wild 'N Out: Veterans vs Rookies/Maino

Season 12 (2018–19)

The twelfth season consists of 26 episodes and premiered on August 17, 2018, on MTV.

- Chance the Rapper/Reesey Nem
- Ludacris/Denzel Curry
- Azealia Banks/Lil Yachty/JaVale McGee
- Rae Sremmurd
- Chloe x Halle
- Trevor Jackson/Deon Cole
- Love & Hip Hop: Atlanta
- Jonathan Cheban/Lais Ribeiro/Ayo & Teo
- Matt Triplet/Yung Joc/Curt Chambers
- Dwight Howard/Brett Grey/Trinidad Cordona
- Tiffany Hayes/Angel McCoughtry/Jay Rock
- BlocBoy JB
- Sasha Banks/Yung Joc/MadeinTYO
- Jacquees
- So So Def Anniversary Special
- Goodie Mob Reunion
- Young M.A./Erica Mena/O.G. Parker/Justin Hires
- O.T. Genasis/Nate Robinson
- Andre Drummond/Kandi Burruss/Lil Baby
- Shaun T/Tyron Woodley/YBN Crew/O.G. Parker
- Desiigner/Love & Hip Hop: Atlanta
- Tiny Harris/Zonnique/Bun B
- Big Tigger/Rico Nasty
- Lil Durk/Bernice Burgos
- Trae tha Truth/Josephine Skriver
- 85 South Show/James Davis/Eric Bellinger/F.L.Y.

Season 13 (2019)

The thirteenth season was filmed in Atlanta from October 29 to November 11, 2018. It premiered on February 1, 2019, on MTV, and continued on VH1 from July 7 to September 15, 2019.

- Lil Duval
- Soulja Boy
- Sky/Doja Cat
- Tory Lanez
- Marlon Wayans/Anderson .Paak/DaniLeigh
- Wiz Khalifa
- Ski Mask The Bird God/LightSkin Keisha/B.Smyth
- Toya Wright/Tiny Harris/Monica Brown/Shy Glizzy
- Vinny Guadagnino/Ronnie Ortiz-Magro/Karol G
- Carmella/R-Truth/Sofi Tukker
- Swizz Beatz/Kash Doll
- Perez Hilton/Lay Lay/JID
- Shiggy/Lil Mosey
- T-Pain/MoneyBagg Yo
- Love & Hip Hop: Hollywood/Kash Doll
- NeNe Leakes/Brentt Leakes/Diggy Simmons/Smino
- Marshmello/Sherrie Silver/O.G. Parker/Yella Beezy
- G Herbo/Eva Marcille
- Akon/Buddy/Sarunas J. Jackson
- Jimmy O. Yang/Michael Rainey Jr./Pardison Fontaine
- Ne-Yo/Kodie Shane
- Cynthia Bailey/YFN Lucci
- Lupe Fiasco
- A$AP Ferg
- Denzel Curry
- TK Kravitz

Season 14 (2019–20)

The fourteenth season was filmed in Atlanta from May 14 to 25, 2019. The season premiered on August 17, 2019, with two episodes and a special that aired on MTV. The rest of the season began airing on VH1 starting on January 7, 2020, and ended on April 14, 2020.

- Dinah Jane
- 2 Chainz
- Mario
- Ginuwine
- Tre'Davious White/Blac Chyna/Asian Da Brat
- Kenya Moore
- Lil Tjay/Polo G/Lala Kent/Corinne Foxx
- Roblé Ali/DDG
- The New Day/Saweetie
- Tarik Cohen/Ted Ginn Jr./Lil Dope Boy
- Kirk Franklin
- Davido
- Black Ink Crew: Chicago/DJ Luke Nasty
- Koffee
- ScHoolboy Q/Smacc
- Charmaine/Ceaser/Flipp Dinero
- Blueface
- PnB Rock
- Casanova/Ms. Juicy/King Los
- Naomi/Jimmy & Jey Uso/Rich The Kid/83 Babies
- Taylor Bennett/Tana Mongeau
- Danielle Herrington/Justina Valentine
- Travis Mills/PnB Rock/Calboy
- YFN Lucci
- King Harris/Young Nudy
- Floribama Shore/Spoken Reasons/Hoodrich Pablo Juan
- The W.M.A.'s: The Wildest Moments Awards

Season 15 (2020–21)

The fifteenth season was filmed in Atlanta from December 9 to 18, 2019, and premiered on April 21, 2020, on VH1, just a week after the end of Season 14. The season continued airing on April 6, 2021, and concluded on May 4, 2021, on VH1.

- Chance the Rapper/Lil Durk/T.I.
- Doja Cat/Big Daddy Kane
- EarthGang/Bone Thugs-n-Harmony
- DaBaby/Too $hort
- Jack Harlow/Tank
- Lil Keed/Karlae/La La Anthony
- Kranium/Sean Paul/Tahiry Jose
- Miles Brown/Marsai Martin/Saint Jhn/EPMD
- Lil Baby/Ying Yang Twins
- DDG/Tommy Davidson
- Cordae/Biz Markie
- Reginae Carter/Sisqó
- Kiana Ledé/Doug E. Fresh
- Montell Jordan/Montel Williams
- Travis Thompson/Cyn Santana/Jonathan Bennett
- Pivot Gang/Naughty By Nature
- Cartel Crew/Cassidy
- FatBoy SSE/Lost Boyz/K Chrys
- Trinidad James/Black Ink Crew: Compton
- Cuban Doll/Juvenile
- AmbjaayHeadkrack/Da Brat
- Rapsody/MC Lyte
- 24kGoldn/Fabo
- OMB Peezy/Big Tigger
- Tyla Yaweh/Yung Joc
- Cory Gunz/Peter Gunz/Queen Naija/Donnell Rawlings

Season 16 (2021)

The sixteenth season was filmed in San Bernardino, California from June 8 to 17, 2021. It premiered on August 10, 2021, and concluded on December 7, 2021, on VH1.

- Fat Joe
- Latto
- BRS Kash
- Morray
- Coi Leray
- Masego
- Gary Owen/DW Flame
- DDG
- NLE Choppa
- Jucee Froot
- 24KGoldn
- Fousheé
- Freddie Gibbs
- Loni Love/VVVanessa
- Rick Ross/ItsAMovie
- Kirk Frost/Rasheeda/Money Mo
- CJ
- Erica Banks
- 42 Dugg
- Malaysia/Nick Cannon
- Too $hort
- Big Freedia
- Hotboii
- Mooski
- Karlie Redd/DDG/TraeTwoThree
- Zaytoven/FO15
- Trina
- Murda Count Harlem

Season 17 (2022)

The seventeenth season was filmed in Jersey City, New Jersey from October 14 to 25, 2021. The season premiered on February 22, 2022, and concluded on May 3, 2022, on VH1.

- Fat Joe
- G-Eazy/Kossisko
- D Smoke
- Jimmie Allen
- LisaRaye/D.C. Young Fly
- Dave East
- Wyclef Jean/Wonda Prince
- Miles Brown/Tommy Davidson/Darius McCrary/Mariah the Scientist
- Baby Tate
- James Davis/DreamDoll
- Tommy Davidson/Yung Bleu
- J.I the Prince of N.Y.
- Donnell Rawlings/Belly
- Capella Grey
- Spice/Hitman Holla
- EST Gee/Naughty By Nature
- Saucy Santana
- Toosii
- Symba
- Eric Bellinger
- Fivio Foreign
- LightSkinKeisha
- Dearica Hamby/Kelsey Plum/Justina Valentine
- Tommy Davidson/Sleepy Hallow
- Sierra Gates/Yung Pooda
- Larry June
- Maxo Kream
- Jackie Christie/Brandi Maxiell/DW Flame/TraeTwoThree
- Kid 'n Play*

Season 18 (2022)

The eighteenth season was filmed in Covington, Georgia from March 29 to April 9, 2022. It premiered on June 21, 2022, and concluded on August 2, 2022, on VH1.

- Bobby Shmurda/YOYO
- Marsai Martin/Emmanuel & Phillip Hudson
- Coco Jones
- 112
- Juelz Santana
- Adam Waheed/Symba
- Hannah Stocking/Special Ed
- Chrisette Michelle/Novi Brown
- Fireboy DML/Nems
- Josh Richards/P-Lo
- Bun B
- Jabari Banks/Jordan L. Jones/OMB Peezy/Nems
- Lakeyah/Andrew Caldwell
- Jordan Chiles/Loui
- Flex Alexander/Soul for Real
- Sherry Cola/Jay Sean/C. King
- Anthony Hamilton
- Álvaro Diaz
- DJ Quik/Rubi Rose
- Ray Vaughn
- Godfrey
- Zack Lugo/DW Flame/C. King
- La'Ron Hines/Toosii/Shawty
- Tyron Woodley/Nems
- Smiley
- Bradley Constant/Trillville
- FatsDaBarber/Thatboyfunny
- Monaleo/Nems/EJ King
- Jon B./TraeTwoThree
- Lil Keed/Big Tigger

Season 19 (2023)

The nineteenth season was filmed concurrently with the twentieth season in Fayetteville, Georgia from August 30 to September 23, 2022. It premiered on April 6, 2023, and concluded on June 29, 2023, on VH1.

- Chance the Rapper
- GloRilla
- Tamar Braxton/Bryce Vine/Keith L. Williams
- Tevin Campbell/Quincy Brown
- Nelly/Jermaine Dupri/Angela Simmons
- Adam Waheed/Girl Codee
- Kai Cenat/Vedo
- Armani White/Ms. Pat
- Hitmaka/Tink/Roxanne Shante
- Monet X Change/Tony T. Roberts
- Tye Tribbett/Amir & Amari O'Neil
- Rickey Smiley/Melii/Javon Walton/Jaden Walton
- DJ Quik/Jahi Winston
- Antonio Brown/Cuttino "Cat" Mobley
- Chet Hanks/Young Dro
- Bianca Belair/The Street Profits/Pheelz
- Daymond John/Pleasure P
- Baby Tate
- Jessica White/Andrew Caldwell/DVSN
- Michael Rapaport/Drew Ryn/Lay Bankz
- Sean Kingston/Robert Williams III
- EarthGang/Arnez J.
- Sidney Starr/Bobb'e J. Thompson
- Pi'erre Bourne
- Travie McCoy
- TraeTwoThree

Season 20 (2023)

The twentieth season was filmed concurrently with the nineteenth season in Fayetteville, Georgia from August 30 to September 23, 2022. This season premiered on July 6, 2023, and concluded on September 28, 2023, on VH1.

- Katt Williams/Mark Curry/Michael Blackson/Justina Valentine
- Kevin Hart/Berner
- Kid n' Play/Full Force
- Chance the Rapper/Taylor Bennett
- King Combs
- Jason Lee/DC Young Fly
- DaniLeigh/Shuba
- Jay Pharoah/Next
- Lil Meech/Travis Porter
- Kirk Franklin
- J. Valentine/Tank
- Ying Yang Twins/James Kennedy
- Ari Fletcher/Rodney Perry/Too $hort
- Xzibit/Too $hort/Michael Blackson
- Jess Hilarious/DW Flame
- DeRay Davis/Jayda Cheaves
- Hannibal Buress
- Bruce Bruce/K Camp
- Affion Crockett/Destanni Henderson/Rich Homie Quan
- Joey Bada$$
- Sevyn Streeter
- Sammie/Bobby V.
- KaMillion
- Lil Duval
- Joe Albanese/Jilly Anais/Michael Blackson

Season 21 (2024–25)

The twenty-first season was filmed in Fayetteville, Georgia from May 23 to June 4, 2023. It premiered on July 29, 2024, on VH1 and concluded the first half on September 23, 2024. The second half of the season premiered on September 1, 2025, and concluded on November 3, 2025, on VH1.

- N.O.R.E.
- Tami Roman/Jazz Anderson/SleazyWorld Go
- Gillie Da King/Wallo/Flau'jae
- Shenseea/Markell Washington
- Tasha K/Hitman Holla
- NLE Choppa
- SWV/Khaotic
- Mariah the Scientist
- Trick Daddy
- Saucy Santana
- Jim Jones/Geena Fontanella
- Dru Hill
- Bobby Shmurda
- Sukihana
- Fabolous/Génesis Dávila
- Finesse Mitchell/BigXthaPlug/Conceited
- Icewear Vezzo/Da'Vinchi
- Tonio Skits/Justina Valentine
- Apryl Jones/Breez Kennedy
- Luh Tyler
- Next/JD McCrary
- Kaliii
- Lecrae
- Carla Hall/Klondike Blonde
- Lil Tjay
- ScarLip/OG Parker
- Big Boss Vette
- KennyHoopla
- Lola Brooke
- 702/Laila Pruitt

== 2020 antisemitism controversy ==
On July 14, 2020, Nick Cannon was fired by ViacomCBS after making racist and antisemitic remarks during an episode of his podcast Cannon's Class with Professor Griff. Cannon endorsed conspiracies about Jewish control of finance, claimed that Jews had stolen the identity of "black people as the 'true Hebrews'" and cited Louis Farrakhan, who is labeled as an anti-semite by the Southern Poverty Law Center and Anti-Defamation League.

Cannon called white people "savages" who were "closer to animals", claiming the "only way that they can act is evil", citing the pseudoscientific melanin theory. A statement from ViacomCBS noted that the company's relationship with Cannon was terminated due to his promotion of "hateful speech and ... anti-Semitic conspiracy theories". Two days later, Cannon released an apology for his remarks regarding anti-Semitism: "I want to assure my Jewish friends, new and old, that this is only the beginning of my education." He demanded complete ownership of Wild 'n Out and an apology from ViacomCBS for his termination.

Upon being made aware of his comments on the podcast, Fox consulted Cannon and accepted his public apology, allowing him to remain host of The Masked Singer. He donated his first paycheck to the Simon Wiesenthal Center. On February 5, 2021, ViacomCBS announced that Wild 'N Out would resume production with Cannon as host, stating that Cannon had "taken responsibility for his comments" and "worked to educate himself" through conversations with Jewish leaders. New episodes began airing on April 6 that same year.
