= Tracey Baker-Simmons =

American film producer

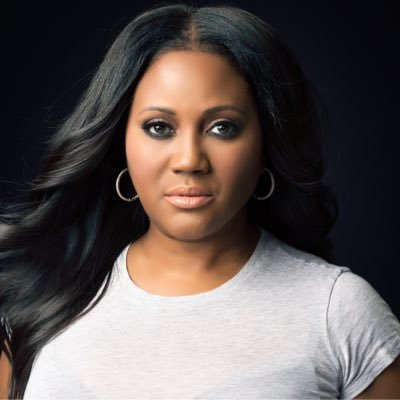
- Born: July 1, 1967 (age 59); Chattanooga, Tennessee
- Occupation: Television producer
- Spouse: Karriem Simmons (m. 2005)
- Children: Jacob Brumfield

Tracey Baker-Simmons (born July 1, 1967, in Chattanooga) is an American television producer and a pioneer of reality television, with more than 25 years of experience in the entertainment industry.

Baker-Simmons began her career in music marketing and promotions at Warner Bros. Records before joining the production company Organized Noize, where she worked on music videos for artists including Brandy, Nas, Monica, Naughty by Nature, Queen Latifah, and Montell Jordan.

She later expanded into commercial production, working on national campaigns for brands including McDonald's and Sprite, before transitioning to film and television production. Her early film work included the independent feature The Book of Love, starring Salli Richardson, Robyn Givens, and Treach.

Baker-Simmons is President and Co-Owner of Simmons-Shelley Entertainment (formerly B2 Entertainment Studios). Her television and film credits include The Houstons: On Our Own, Bobbi Kristina, T.I. & Tiny: Friends & Family Hustle, Love Match Atlanta, The Conversations Project, Hip Hop Treasures, and Nelly & Ashanti: We Belong Together. She has produced projects for networks and platforms including Bravo, Lifetime, TV One, Hallmark, A&E, Hulu, OWN, VH1, and Peacock.

In recent years, Baker-Simmons has focused on content development and has worked as a showrunner and executive producer. She served as executive producer and director of Hip Hop Treasures, featuring LL Cool J and Ice-T. The Conversations Project received a Telly Award and an Anthem Award and was nominated for a GLAAD Media Award. She is also an executive producer of the upcoming documentary series Women in Hip Hop for Showtime.

Baker-Simmons is a co-founder of B2 Behind the Scenes, a nonprofit organization dedicated to exposing young minority men and women to career opportunities in television and film production. She graduated from the University of Memphis with a degree in Marketing and Finance and is an industry-expert instructor at the Goizueta Business School at Emory University, where she bridges the gap between creative entertainment media and practical business management.

== Career ==
Baker-Simmons began her career in the Music and Promotions department at Warner Brothers Music before transitioning into television and commercial production at LeRoux, where she produced music videos and regional commercials for artists and brands. In 1992, she joined Westside Stories, producing projects for directors Keith Ward and Julie Dash. From 1992 to 1997, she produced hundreds of music videos and television commercials for Brandy, Immature, Montell Jordan, Arrested Development, Nas, and other artists. Her commercial work during this period included campaigns for Coca-Cola, Sprite, McDonald's, and MCI.

In 1998, Baker-Simmons co-founded Strange Fruit Films, a multifaceted production company, where she served as executive producer and oversaw music video production, including projects for director Jeff Byrd. She later produced the independent feature film The Book of Love, directed by Byrd. After leaving Strange Fruit Films, she worked as a freelance television producer for clients including distributor Pearson Television, ABC, and CBS.

In 2003, Baker-Simmons co-founded B2 Entertainment with Wanda Shelley. She developed the concept for Being Bobby Brown, starring Bobby Brown and Whitney Houston, which premiered on the Bravo network in 2005. She served as producer and executive producer on the series. During this period, she also produced Tyler Perry's Tyler Perry's House of Payne and a TBS summer promotional campaign featuring Chrisette Michele.

In 2009, B2 Entertainment Studios was renamed Simmons-Shelley Entertainment. That year, Baker-Simmons served as executive producer of Platinum House with Keith Sweat, featuring Dru Hill, and as supervising producer of Welcome to Dreamland, featuring producers Drumma Boy and Jazze Pha. The programs initially aired as specials on Peachtree TV, a Turner Broadcasting System station, and later on BET Networks.

In January 2010, Simmons-Shelley Entertainment, in partnership with Rain Forest Films, The Coca-Cola Company, and MTV, debuted the docuseries Sprite Step-Off on MTV2. Hosted by Chris "Ludacris" Bridges, the series followed six step teams from fraternities and sororities across the United States as they competed in the Sprite Step Off. Baker-Simmons also served as executive producer of Keith Sweat's Platinum House.

In 2012, Baker-Simmons served as executive producer and showrunner of Season 1 of Lifetime's The Houstons: On Our Own, which premiered October 24, 2012, and featured members of Whitney Houston's family. She also served as executive producer of The Houstons Remember Whitney. During this period, she served as Head of Development for Jarrett Creative.

In 2014, Baker-Simmons worked as a field producer on Bleaching Black Culture. In 2015, she served as co-executive producer of Boss Nails. In 2017, she served as executive producer of Bobbi Kristina. In 2018, she served as co-executive producer of VH1 Beauty Bar.

In 2019, Baker-Simmons served as co-executive producer of Hustle & Soul and T.I. & Tiny: Friends & Family Hustle, continuing on the latter through 2020. From 2020 to 2021, she served as co-executive producer of OWN Spotlight: They Call Me Dad. In 2021, she served as executive producer of Sugar Plum Twist. In 2022, she served as co-executive producer of Love Match Atlanta.

In 2023, Baker-Simmons served as executive producer of Hip Hop Treasures and The Conversations Project. In 2025, she served as co-executive producer of Nelly & Ashanti: We Belong Together. In 2026, she became executive producer of the Netflix drama series Hoops, based on Kennedy Ryan's basketball romance trilogy.

== Personal Life ==
Baker-Simmons is married with one son.

== Awards and nominations ==
Year	Award	Result	Category	Series
2010	NATAS Southeast Regional Emmy Award	Nominated	Best Program Feature/Segment and Program Special	Keith Sweat's Platinum House
2010	NATAS Southeast Regional Emmy Award	Nominated	Best Program Feature/Segment and Program Special	Sprite Step-Off
2024	Anthem Awards	Won	Diversity, Equity & Inclusion (Film, Video, Television or Show)	The Conversations Project
2024	Telly Awards	Won	Series: DEI (Diversity, Equity & Inclusion); Series: Non-Scripted	The Conversations Project
2024	GLAAD Media Awards	Nominated	Outstanding Variety or Talk Show Episode	The Conversations Project (for "The Hardest Fight Is the Fight Against Status Quo")

== Filmography ==
=== Producer ===
Year	Title	Role	Notes
2002	Book of Love	Producer	Credited as Tracey Baker
2005	Being Bobby Brown	Creative Executive Producer	11 episodes
2009	Welcome to Dreamland	Executive Producer and Supervising Producer	6 episodes
2010	Sprite Step Off	Executive Producer	6 episodes
2010	Keith Sweat's Platinum House	Executive Producer	1 episode
2012	The Houstons: On Our Own	Executive Producer	14 episodes
2012	The Houstons Remember Whitney	Executive Producer	TV movie
2014	Bleaching Black Culture	Field Producer	Documentary
2015	Boss Nails	Co-Executive Producer	8 episodes
2017	Bobbi Kristina	Executive Producer	TV movie
2018	VH1 Beauty Bar	Co-Executive Producer	6 episodes
2019	Hustle & Soul	Co-Executive Producer	9 episodes
2019–2020	T.I. & Tiny: Friends & Family Hustle	Co-Executive Producer	6 episodes
2020–2021	OWN Spotlight: They Call Me Dad	Co-Executive Producer	2 episodes
2021	Sugar Plum Twist	Executive Producer	TV movie
2022	Love Match Atlanta	Co-Executive Producer	5 episodes
2023	The Conversations Project	Executive Producer	6 episodes
2023	Hip Hop Treasures	Executive Producer	8 episodes
2025	Nelly & Ashanti: We Belong Together	Co-Executive Producer	8 episodes

== Sources ==
- Rim, April. 2010. “Making a TV Concept Sing.” Emory University, September 15, 2010.
- http://www.newlifeortho.com/1085.html
- Brown, Rochelle. 2009. “Simmons-Shelley Entertainment and R&B Legend Keith Sweat Present Platinum House for Peachtree TV.” PRLog, February 16, 2009.
- MTV. 2010. “Sprite Step Off.” MTV, February 2, 2010.
- Baker-Simmons, Tracey. 2022. “What an Executive Producer Does in a Workday.” The Washington Post, May 31, 2022.
- Butler, Bethonie, and Emily Yahr. 2021. “What Does Reality TV Owe Black Women?” The Washington Post, October 14, 2021.
- Elsworth, Catherine. 2026. “It Doesn’t Matter Who Won the Oscars, David Ellison Has Hollywood in the Bag.” The Observer, March 15, 2026.
- Mayo, Lauren. 2024. “A Peek Inside Her Agenda: Tracey Baker Simmons.” Her Agenda, April 1, 2024.
- Urban One. 2017. “TV One’s Highly Anticipated Original Movie ‘Bobbi Kristina’ Slated to Premiere Sunday, October 8.” Urban One, August 30, 2017.
- Danielle Young. 2017. “Exclusive: Behind the Scenes of the Bobbi Kristina Movie.” Essence, October 6, 2017.
- Hulu. n.d. “The Conversations Project.” Hulu Press.
- A&E Network. 2023. “A&E Network Announces New Series ‘Hip Hop Treasures’ Premiering August 12 at 10p ET/PT Featuring LL COOL J and Ice T.” A&E, June 21, 2023.
- https://awsprxdam.crownmediadev.com.s3-us-west-1.amazonaws.com/highRes/4253591.pdf
- Petski, Denise. 2026. “‘Hoops’ Drama Series Based on Kennedy Ryan’s Books in Works at Netflix.” Deadline, September 23, 2026.
