= Wanda Shelley =

American producer (born 1969)

- Born: April 12, 1969 (age 57); Atlanta, Georgia
- Occupation: Television producer
- Children: Chandler Shelley

Wanda Shelley (born April 12, 1969 in Atlanta, GA) is an American producer, best known as one of the pioneers of urban reality television, is a 10-year production veteran and Vice-President/ Co Owner of Simmons-Shelley Entertainment formerly B2 Entertainment Studios.

== Biography ==
Wanda attended Howard University before transferring to Georgia State University, where she graduated with a degree in Marketing and Business Administration. She began her marketing and sales career at GTE in Irving, Texas, which introduced her to the concepts of advertising. She is the co-founder of B2 Behind the Scenes, a non-profit organization that educates young men and women about careers available to them behind the camera. She resides in Atlanta, Georgia, with her daughter.

== Career ==
After college Shelley began her marketing and sales career at AstraZeneca as a Pharmaceutical Specialist. In 2001, she was offered a position at PDI.

Shelley entered into production as an executive producer/investor in the 2002 independent feature film The Book of Love, also directed by Jeff Byrd and starring Sallie Richardson, Robin Givins, Treach of Naughty by Nature, and Richard T. Jones of Judging Amy.

Shelley and producer Tracey Baker-Simmons established B2 Entertainment Studios LLC, an Atlanta-based production. Most notably, B2 Entertainment Studios, are known for the pop culture reality classic, Being Bobby Brown starring R&B crooner and co-founder and member of pop boyband turned R&B Group New Edition, Bobby Brown and R&B/Pop legend Whitney Houston which aired in 2005 on the Bravo network.

She served as a Producer for Tyler Perry's House of Payne Summer Promotional Campaign featuring Chrisette Michele. In 2009, B2 Entertainment Studios was renamed Simmons-Shelley Entertainment. Shelley is the Executive Producer with R&B legend Keith Sweat, of reality series Platinum House featuring Dru Hill of Supervising producer of Welcome to Dreamland starring multi-platinum producers Drumma Boy and Jazze Pha which first aired as specials on Peachtree TV, a Turner Broadcasting System station and slated for Summer '09 debut both on the BET networks.

Simmons-Shelley Entertainment in partnership with Rain Forest Films, The Coca-Cola Company and MTV debut their docu-series for MTV2 Sprite Step-Off in January 2010 Hosted by Rapper and Actor Chris Ludacris Bridges, the series follows six step teams from fraternities and sororities across the country as they in the Sprite Step Off.

== Filmography ==
- The Book of Love (2002) (Executive Producer)
- Being Bobby Brown (2005) (Executive Producer)
- Being Buju Banton (Executive Producer)
- Tyler Perry's House of Payne Summer Promo Campaign (2008) (Producer)
- Platinum House (2009) (Executive Producer)
- Welcome to Dreamland (2009) (Supervising Producer)
- MTV2 Sprite Step-Off (2010) (Executive Producer)
