= Clifford Harris =

Clifford Harris may refer to:

- Clifford Harris (cricketer), New Zealand cricketer
- T.I. (Clifford Joseph Harris Jr., born 1980), American rapper and actor
- Kid Saiyan (Clifford Joseph Harris III, born 2004), his son, American rapper
- Cliff Harris (born 1948), American football player
