= Kill the King =

Kill the King may refer to:

- Kill the King (album), by T.I.
- "Kill the King", a song by Megadeth, 2000
- "Kill the King", a song by Rainbow from Long Live Rock 'n' Roll, 1978
- "Kill the King", an episode from Series 1 of The Avengers
- Shangri-La Suite, a 2016 crime drama film also known as Kill the King
