= Justina Valentine =

American rapper (born 1987)

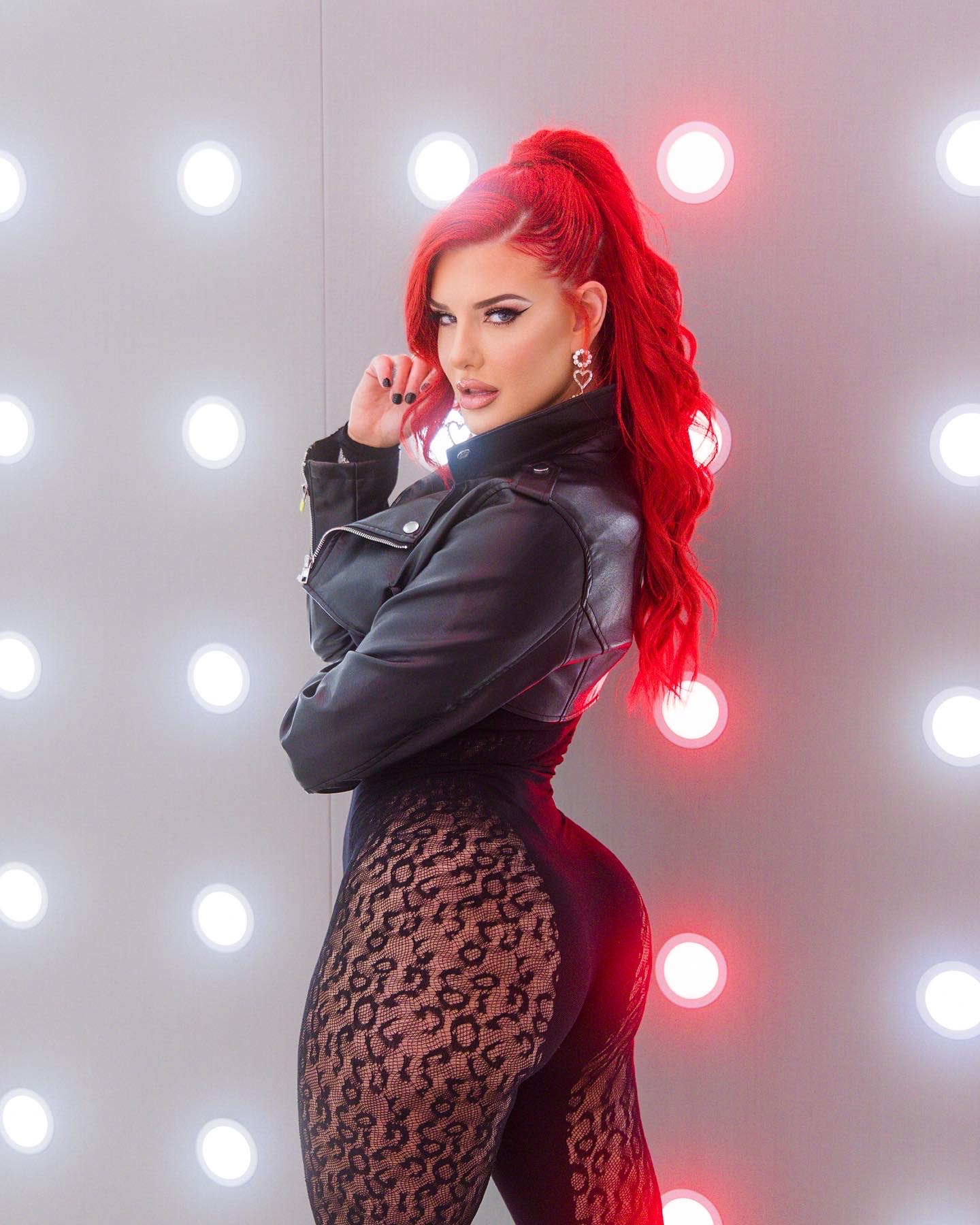
- Valentine in 2023

Background information
- Born: February 14, 1987 (age 39); Passaic County, New Jersey, U.S.
- Genres: Hip hop; R&B; soul
- Occupations: Rapper; singer; television show host
- Years active: 2012–present
- Labels: Ncredible Entertainment; Empire (current)

Justina Valentine (born February 14, 1987) is an American television host, rapper and singer from Passaic County, New Jersey, best known for her singles "Candy Land" featuring rapper Fetty Wap, "All The Way" and "Unbelievable". She is also known as a cast member on the improv comedy show Wild 'n Out (2016–present).

== Early life ==
Justina Valentine was born on February 14, 1987, in Passaic County, New Jersey. She is of Italian descent. She grew up in a family of musicians and worked in theatre and studied dancing as a child. Valentine always had a love for hip hop and R&B. In 2006, she started recording her own music.

== Career ==
Valentine released her first mixtape Route 80 in 2012, which included the singles "Bubble Gum" and "Hip-hop Joan Jett". She released the EP Valentine in 2013, debuting at number 38 on the iTunes R&B charts. On July 8, 2014, the singer released her second mixtape, Red Velvet. In 2016, she released her studio album, Scarlet Letter.

In 2017, Valentine released a third mixtape, Feminem, described as a homage to the rapper Eminem. She released the album Favorite Vibe in 2019, which debuted in the top 30 hip hop charts and gained over a million streams in its first two weeks. Favorite Vibe was shortly followed by the album Infrared in 2020, which debuted in the top 5 on the iTunes charts. Infrared is described as "an infusion of classic hip hop and R&B, with a pop sensibility."

In 2016, Valentine was added to the cast of season 8 of Wild 'n Out on MTV (later VH1) and has been a member of the cast for every successive season since. As of season 17, she is the longest running female cast member to appear on the show.

Valentine competed on season 1 of the reality series special for MTV's The Challenge titled Champs vs. Stars, which premiered on November 21, 2017. Valentine made it to the finale, finishing as a runner-up alongside fellow "Stars" UFC fighter Michelle Waterson and The Bachelorette Season 10 winner Josh Murray. In 2019, Valentine hosted the two-part reunion of The Challenge: War of the Worlds 2.

In November 2018, Valentine was selected to co-host a relaunched version of the MTV dating game show Singled Out alongside rapper and fellow Wild 'n Out cast member Conceited that aired exclusively on the network's YouTube channel.

In August 2019, Valentine and fellow Wild 'n Out cast member Chico Bean stated that Sebastian Maniscalco was Valentine's "second freaking cousin".

In 2021, Valentine began appearing weekly alongside Nick Cannon on his syndicated daytime talk show, Nick Cannon, during "The Rap Up" and other segments.

In February 2022, she became the third host of the iHeartRadio and MTV podcast series MTV's Women of Wild 'n Out, alongside co-hosts B. Simone and Pretty Vee.

Valentine has also gained prominence as a social media personality on TikTok where she actively posts content. As of September 2022, her account has amassed over 10 million followers and over 200 million likes.

== Musical style and influences ==
Valentine's eclectic music style infuses hip hop with elements of other genres.

== Discography ==
Albums

- Scarlet Letter (2016)
- Favorite Vibe (2019)
- Infrared (2020)

EPs

- Valentine (2013)

Mixtapes

- Route 80 (2012)
- Red Velvet (2014)
- Feminem (2017)

== Filmography ==
Television
Year	Title	Role	Notes
2016–present	Wild 'n Out	Cast Member	Season 8–present
2017–2018	The Challenge: Champs vs. Stars	Competitor	Runner-Up
2017–2018	TRL	Guest	
2017–2018	TRL	Guest Co-Host	2 episodes
2018	Jersey Shore: Family Vacation	Reunion Special Host	
2018	Ridiculousness	Guest	Episode: "Justina Valentine"
2018	Singled Out	Co-Host	
2019	How Far Is Tattoo Far?	Co-Host	Season 2
2019	Nick Cannon Presents: Fresh Artists	Guest	TeenNick; Episode: "Justina Valentine"
2019	Double Shot at Love	Reunion Special Host	
2019	The Challenge: War of the Worlds 2	Reunion Special Host	
2019–2024	Basic to Bougie	Co-Host	MTV
2019	Hip Hop Squares	Panelist	Episode: "Queen Naija vs. Clarence White"
2019–2020	Lip Locked	Host	MTV Digital Original Series
2019–2020	Justina Makes Over Your Man	Host	MTV Digital Original Series
2020	The Justina Valentine Show	Host	MTV Digital Original Series
2020–2021	Revenge Prank	Guest	3 episodes
2021	1st Look Presents: Celebrity Sleepover	Guest	NBC
2021–2022	Nick Cannon	Recurring Guest	Fox
2022	Jersey Shore: Family Vacation	Guest; Reunion Special Host	3 episodes
2022	Dark is the Night	Gina	Scare Network Original Series
2022	Fuhgeddabout Christmas	Various Characters	VH1 Original Movie; also Executive Producer and Director

== Tours ==
- Vans Warped Tour (2012)
- Relief Tour (2013)
- Vans Warped Tour (2014)
- Mike Stud Tour (2014)
- Liquid Sunshine Experience Tour (2015)
- Hate Us Cause They Ain't Us Tour (2016)
- As Seen on the Internet Tour (2016)
- Scarlet Letter Tour (2016)
- Weirdo Tour (2017)
- Favorite Vibe Tour (2019)
- Wild ‘N Out Live (Cast Member) (Multiple Tours; 2018–2022)
