= Van Van =

American child rapper and social media personality

VanVan
- Born: Savannah McConneaughey; 2019 (age 6–7); Salisbury, North Carolina, U.S.
- Genres: Hip-hop; Children's music
- Occupations: Rapper; actress; voice actress
- Years active: 2022–present
- Labels: Sunni Gyrl, Inc.; VanVan Music; Vydia
- Website: theofficialvanvan.com

Savannah McConneaughey, known mononymously as VanVan is an American child rapper and social media personality.

She rose to prominence through viral videos posted on TikTok and Instagram, where she performed playful and educational rap songs about everyday life, school, and childhood activities.

== Early life and background ==
Savannah McConneaughey was born in Salisbury, North Carolina, to Reggie McConneaughey, a high school history teacher, and Tikenjna (Kenya). McConneaughey began rapping at the age of two, when her father, Reggie, used music to teach her numbers, colors and the alphabet. As she grew older, Savannah developed her freestyle skills, eventually choosing her own beats and rapping about whatever she was feeling.

== Career ==
VanVan's public profile developed through videos shared by her parents on social media, including clips of her singing, dancing and mimicking television shows. An early breakthrough came in April 2023, when she attracted online attention after singing "Nothing Else Matters" at her grandfather's church. A few days later, her father posted a video of her rapping original lyrics with the caption, "[W]e are going to the studio with this 1".

In the summer of 2023, VanVan performed at the Essence Festival in New Orleans. In December 2023, she appeared at the Kennedy Center Honors in Washington, D.C., performing alongside MC Lyte, Yo-Yo, Monie Love, and DJ D-Nice in a tribute to honoree Queen Latifah, which included a rendition of "Ladies First." That same year, VanVan was featured on a track with Snoop Dogg's children's educational project Doggyland, a 3D-animated YouTube. She has performed alongside Missy Elliott and The Clark Sisters, and has been featured in Essence magazine.

In early 2024, MC Lyte signed VanVan to her Sunni Gyrl, Inc. label and released the single "Pull Out The Keys," for which Lyte served as director. Around the same time, VanVan secured a regional advertisement with the fast food chain Bojangles in connection with Super Bowl coverage. In January 2024, VanVan performed alongside the Charlotte Symphony Youth Orchestra, with orchestral arrangements of her existing singles. She also appeared on the Tamron Hall Show during this period. VanVan independently released her debut self-titled album, VanVan, in July 2024. In June 2024, she performed at the BET Awards.

In September 2025, VanVan released a remix of her song "Do The Right Thing" featuring Bun B of the rap duo UGK, produced by Souljagotbeatz and Jwitdahitz. The same month, she made her acting debut on the ABC primetime series Abbott Elementary, playing a student alongside Sheryl Lee Ralph. She also appeared on The Jennifer Hudson Show. A children's picture book co-authored with MC Lyte, Rhyme Time Adventures: VanVan and MC Lyte's Magical Melodies, was announced for release in the same period.

== Discography ==
=== Studio albums ===
Title	Year	Label	Notes
Van Van	2024	VanVan Music	Independently released; July 2024

=== Singles ===
Title	Year	Featured artist(s)	Album
"Playing Outside Every Day"	2023	—N/a	Van Van
"Pull Out The Keys"	2024	—N/a	Van Van
"Be You"	2024	Heiress Harris	Van Van
"Too Bold"	2024	MC Lyte, Da Brat & Rapsody	Van Van
"Do The Right Thing" (Remix)	2025	Bun B	Non-album single

=== Guest appearances ===
Title	Year	Artist	Notes
"Clean Up Song" (Remix)	2024	Snoop Dogg / Doggyland	Featured on Doggyland live-action sing-along episode

== Filmography ==
=== Television ===
Title	Year	Role
Doggyland	2024–present	Vancy the Dalmatian (voice)
The Tamron Hall Show	2024	Herself
Abbott Elementary	2025	Student
The Jennifer Hudson Show	2025	Herself

=== Live performances and events ===
Event	Year	Notes
Essence Festival	2023	Performed in New Orleans
Kennedy Center Honors	2023	Performed "Ladies First" tribute to Queen Latifah alongside MC Lyte, Yo-Yo, Monie Love, and DJ D-Nice
Charlotte Symphony Youth Orchestra	2024	Performed with orchestral arrangements of her singles; Salisbury, North Carolina
BET Awards	2024	Performed at the ceremony
Cheerwine Festival	2024–2025	Live performance appearance

== Awards and nominations ==
Awards and nominations for Heiress Harris
Year	Award	Category	Result	Ref.
2024	BET Awards	Young Stars Award	Nominated	
2024	Queen City Music Awards	Youth Artist of the Year	Won	
2025	Queen City Music Awards	Youth Artist of the Year	Nominated	
2026	BET Awards	Young Stars Award	Pending	
