= Let 'Em Know =

Single by T.I.

from the album Kill the King
- Released: January 18, 2026
- Genre: Southern hip hop; trap
- Length: 2:59
- Label: Grand Hustle; Empire
- Songwriters: Clifford Harris; Pharrell Williams
- Producer: Williams

T.I. singles chronology
"Havin' My Way" (2025)	"Let 'Em Know" (2026)	"War (Snippet)" (2026)

Music video
- "Let 'Em Know" on YouTube

"Let 'Em Know" is a song by American rapper T.I., released on January 18, 2026 as the lead single from his twelfth studio album, Kill the King. It was produced by Pharrell Williams. A "bouncy", braggadocious song, it is built around driving chords and a heavy bass.

== Background ==
On January 17, 2026, T.I. announced his comeback on social media with a preview of the song and its music video.

== Critical reception ==
Gabriel Bras Nevares of HotNewHipHop gave a positive review, writing "It's a hard-hitting and unsurprisingly bouncy cut, which sounds a lot like some of the Atlanta rapper's best material over the decades. Maybe it won't convince you that he's still as good as ever, but you can't deny that he carries himself on the beat with a lot of charismatic energy head-bobbing flows."

== Commercial performance ==
"Let 'Em Know" debuted at number 83 on the Billboard Hot 100 for the week ending January 30, 2026. It has since peaked at number 33, making it T.I.'s highest charting single since 2014's "No Mediocre".

== Charts ==
Chart performance for "Let 'Em Know"
Chart (2026)	Peak position
New Zealand Hot Singles (RMNZ)	24
US Billboard Hot 100	33
US Hot R&B/Hip-Hop Songs (Billboard)	8
US Hot Rap Songs (Billboard)	4
US Rhythmic Airplay (Billboard)	1

== Certifications ==
Certifications for "Let 'Em Know"
Region	Certification	Certified units/sales
United States (RIAA)	Platinum	1,000,000^{‡}
^{‡} Sales+streaming figures based on certification alone.
