= List of T.I. & Tiny: The Family Hustle episodes =

T.I. & Tiny: The Family Hustle is an American reality television series that airs on VH1 and premiered on December 5, 2011. On May 29, 2017, the final and 100th episode of T.I. & Tiny: The Family Hustle aired.

== Series overview ==
Season	Episodes	Originally aired	
Season	Episodes	First aired	Last aired
1	14	December 5, 2011	March 12, 2012
2	17	September 3, 2012	December 17, 2012
3	18	April 8, 2013	October 14, 2013
4	22	March 31, 2014	November 25, 2014
5	21	June 1, 2015	September 19, 2016
6	8	April 17, 2017	May 29, 2017

== Episodes ==
=== Season 1 (2011–12) ===
No. overall	No. in season	Title	Original release date	US viewers (millions)
1	1	"God, Family, Hustle"	December 5, 2011	2.82
2	2	"Booty Tag"	December 5, 2011	3.08
3	3	"America's Sweetheart"	December 12, 2011	2.27
4	4	"Stacks on Deck"	December 19, 2011	2.62
5	5	"I Will Put My Foot in Your Back Pocket"	January 1, 2012	1.33
6	6	"Bad and Sneaky"	January 2, 2012	2.59
7	7	"King of the House"	January 9, 2012	3.23
8	8	"Tip Clause"	January 16, 2012	3.00
9	9	"Baby Fever"	February 6, 2012	2.50
10	10	"Green Faces"	February 13, 2012	1.06
11	11	"Baby Girl"	February 20, 2012	2.32
12	12	"Sixty Forty"	February 27, 2012	2.12
13	13	"Can You Work"	March 5, 2012	2.02
14	14	"All for One"	March 12, 2012	2.03

=== Season 2 (2012) ===
No. overall	No. in season	Title	Original release date	US viewers (millions)
15	1	"Family Camping"	September 3, 2012	4.14
16	2	"Birthday Bash"	September 3, 2012	3.99
17	3	"Harris Proof"	September 10, 2012	2.05
18	4	"Bitter Sweet 16"	September 17, 2012	1.76
19	5	"Windy City Hustle"	September 24, 2012	1.88
20	6	"Who's The Boss?"	October 1, 2012	1.45
21	7	"Harris Family Fitness Challenge"	October 8, 2012	1.35
22	8	"Bucket List"	October 15, 2012	1.78
23	9	"Family Pet"	October 22, 2012	1.42
24	10	"Plastic Surgery"	October 29, 2012	2.18
25	11	"Lemonade Stand"	November 5, 2012	1.77
26	12	"Bust A Move"	November 12, 2012	2.03
27	13	"Major's Precious"	November 19, 2012	1.83
28	14	"Etiquette Coach"	November 26, 2012	1.92
29	15	"City Cowboy"	December 3, 2012	1.86
30	16	"It Takes Two To Hustle"	December 10, 2012	1.63
31	17	"A Very Harris Christmas"	December 17, 2012	1.71

=== Season 3 (2013) ===
No. overall	No. in season	Title	Original release date	US viewers (millions)
32	1	"Snow Hustle"	April 8, 2013	1.35
33	2	"A Major Move"	April 15, 2013	1.42
34	3	"King Chaos"	April 22, 2013	2.64
35	4	"The Love Letter"	April 29, 2013	2.58
36	5	"Hair Therapy"	May 6, 2013	2.58
37	6	"Play Date"	May 13, 2013	2.58
38	7	"Hello"	May 20, 2013	2.53
39	8	"Becoming a Man"	August 5, 2013	3.50
40	9	"Magnum, T.I."	August 12, 2013	3.70
41	10	"Family Legacy"	August 19, 2013	2.37
42	11	"Boot Camp"	August 26, 2013	1.95
43	12	"White for a Day"	September 2, 2013	1.83
44	13	"Who's the Better Driver?"	September 9, 2013	1.60
45	14	"Ringmasters"	September 16, 2013	1.74
46	15	"The Workout Video"	September 23, 2013	1.52
47	16	"Education First"	September 30, 2013	1.61
48	17	"Back on Tour"	October 7, 2013	1.76
49	18	"Family Fun Time"	October 14, 2013	1.83

=== Season 4 (2014) ===
No. overall	No. in season	Title	Original release date	US viewers (millions)
50	1	"Inquiring Intel"	March 31, 2014	2.24
51	2	"Call 911"	April 7, 2014	1.74
52	3	"Gravi-TI"	April 14, 2014	1.64
53	4	"The Contract"	April 21, 2014	1.90
54	5	"Kindred Spirits"	April 28, 2014	1.87
55	6	"The Rainmaker"	May 5, 2014	2.79
56	7	"The Assistant"	May 12, 2014	2.48
57	8	"Make A Wish"	May 19, 2014	2.46
58	9	"Field Trip"	June 11, 2014	0.81
59	10	"Major's First Dance"	June 11, 2014	N/A
60	11	"Harris Family Lemonade"	August 25, 2014	2.46
61	12	"Get EDGE-ucated"	September 1, 2014	2.43
62	13	"Hypnotist"	September 8, 2014	2.25
63	14	"Athletic-Off"	September 15, 2014	2.13
64	15	"Country Day"	September 22, 2014	1.82
65	16	"Home Alone"	September 29, 2014	N/A
66	17	"Prank Wars"	October 6, 2014	N/A
67	18	"Chef TI"	October 6, 2014	N/A
68	19	"Domani the Comedian"	October 13, 2014	N/A
69	20	"Major Learns to Swim"	October 20, 2014	N/A
70	21	"Harris Family Carnival"	November 25, 2014	N/A
71	22	"Harris Thanksgiving"	November 25, 2014	N/A

=== Season 5 (2015–16) ===
No. overall	No. in season	Title	Original release date	US viewers (millions)
72	1	"Costa Rica"	June 1, 2015	1.78
73	2	"Moving Out"	June 8, 2015	1.50
74	3	"Mr. Fixer-upper"	June 15, 2015	1.63
75	4	"Are You Smarter?"	June 22, 2015	1.63
76	5	"Pesky House Guest"	June 29, 2015	1.53
77	6	"Superhero"	July 6, 2015	1.63
78	7	"A Major Manager"	July 13, 2015	1.41
79	8	"Stakeout"	July 13, 2015	1.43
80	9	"A Precious Date"	July 20, 2015	1.49
81	10	"Restaurant"	July 27, 2015	1.42
82	11	"Harris Haunted House"	August 3, 2015	1.30
83	12	"All About Domani"	July 18, 2016	1.79
84	13	"Crow’s Bucket List"	July 25, 2016	1.84
85	14	"A Major Baptism"	August 1, 2016	1.63
86	15	"A Major Project"	August 8, 2016	1.48
87	16	"A Major Sport"	August 15, 2016	1.31
88	17	"Where's Major?"	August 22, 2016	1.59
89	18	"Stuntin"	August 29, 2016	1.44
90	19	"It's a Yard Sale"	September 12, 2016	1.34
91	20	"Blackmail"	September 19, 2016	1.46
92	21	"The Announcement"	September 19, 2016	1.38

=== Season 6 (2017) ===
No. overall	No. in season	Title	Original release date	US viewers (millions)
93	1	"Basically, He Was Framed"	April 17, 2017	2.41
94	2	"Working Girl"	April 17, 2017	2.36
95	3	"Mug Shot"	April 24, 2017	1.73
96	4	"Xscape Is in the Building"	May 1, 2017	1.78
97	5	"Domani's Platform"	May 15, 2017	1.61
98	6	"Look at the Car, Bro"	May 15, 2017	1.61
99	7	"What I Should Have Said Was..."	May 22, 2017	1.63
100	8	"100"	May 29, 2017	1.53
