= Conceited (rapper) =

American rapper (born 1989)

- Born: Reginald Sergile; 10 March 1989 (age 37); New York City, US
- Genres: Hip-hop
- Occupation: Battle Rapper

Reginald Sergile (born 10 March 1989), commonly known as Conceited, is an American battle rapper from Brooklyn, New York City best known for his recurring role on the MTV program Wild 'n Out.

Conceited has appeared on King of the Dot in Canada, Ultimate Rap League in the US, Don't Flop in the UK, Got Beef? in Australia, and on O-Zone Battles in Sweden. He battled against Dumbfoundead at KOTD's "Blackout 5" event in Toronto.

His face during the rap battle in 2009 against Jesse James, organized by the Ultimate Rap League, became a meme in 2016.

He also had his own sneakers show on MTV called Sneaker Wars, and co-hosted the 2018 YouTube revival of Singled Out alongside Justina Valentine.

In May 2022, he became co-presenter of the revived MTV show Yo! MTV Raps.

In November 2024, Laugh Out Loud Productions announced a cooking show called What's Cookin' Good Lookin', featuring Conceited and Justina Valentine as its hosts.
