= Singled Out =

American dating game show

- Genre: Dating game show
- Created by: Burt Wheeler; Sharon Sussman
- Presented by: Chris Hardwick; Jenny McCarthy; Carmen Electra; Justina Valentine; Conceited; Keke Palmer; Joel Kim Booster
- Announcer: Royale Watkins
- Country of origin: United States

Production
- Executive producers: Gary Auerbach; Burt Wheeler; Sharon Sussman
- Production locations: Empire Burbank Studios, Burbank, California
- Running time: 22 minutes (1995–98); 10–15 minutes (2018–19)
- Production company: MTV Productions

Original release
- Network: MTV
- Release: June 5, 1995 – May 22, 1998
- Network: YouTube; Quibi
- Release: November 19, 2018 – April 6, 2020

Singled Out is an American dating game show created by Burt Wheeler & Sharon Sussman which originally ran on MTV from 1995 to 1998. Each episode was split between 50 single women competing for a date with one male contestant, and 50 single men competing for a date with one female contestant.

The original hosts were Chris Hardwick and Jenny McCarthy. When McCarthy left the show in early 1997 to star in her own sitcom, Jenny, MTV hired Carmen Electra to replace her for the last season and a half.

The show became a cult classic, putting a more comedic spin on traditional and formal dating shows. Contestants would most likely be unconventional and cast purely for entertainment, without any assumed compatibility put into effect.

MTV relaunched the series November 19, 2018 as S1NGLED OUT on its YouTube channel. Despite attempts to modernize the format by incorporating a social media aspect and implementing MTV’s Wild 'N Out cast members Justina Valentine and Conceited as hosts to appeal to its urban contemporary & hip hop audience, the series reboot only lasted seven episodes.

On June 4, 2019, it was announced that a reboot of the series would premiere on April 6, 2020 on Quibi with Keke Palmer & Joel Kim Booster as hosts.

== Format (1995–1998) ==
Each game began with one main contestant, the "Picker", being escorted onto the set blindfolded in front of the 50 potential dates in the "Dating Pool" while the announcer described him/her. The Picker was then led to a seat facing away from the Dating Pool and further divided from the potential dates by a wall.

=== Round 1 ===
The Picker was presented with a board showing six categories, which ranged from physical attributes to preferences in love-making to leisure activities. They generally were expressed in a humorous style, often with various pop-culture references. After choosing a category, two or three choices were listed (for example, a category on hair might be divided into blonde, brunette, and redhead), and the Picker was asked to eliminate one of the choices. After eliminating a choice, all the contestants who fit that choice left the Dating Pool, in view of the Picker. This process was repeated until five to eight potentials were left, at which point they advanced to the next round.

In the third season, a Golden Ticket was introduced, which allowed the Picker to save one eliminated player as they walked in front of him on the way out of the studio. This contestant automatically advanced to the semifinals. For episodes taped outside, the "Golden Ticket" was replaced with a Golden Lifesaver, with the same rules.

=== Round 2 ===
At that point, the Picker asked a series of questions which ranged from Dating Game–style questions (example, "if you had me alone in a limousine for three hours, what would you do to me?") to stunt-oriented questions (example, hitting a paddle ball a number of times, with the female host relaying the potential date's performance to the Picker). If the Picker was satisfied with the answer or performance, they would "keep" the contestant, advancing them to the final round. If the Picker was not satisfied, they would "dump" the contestant, eliminating him or her from further play. "Dumped" contestants were not shown to the Picker as in the first round, but were instead marked with some sort of prop, such as a toilet seat around the neck, a bag with a sad face on it on the male player's head, or a pageant sash labeled "Dumped". This round continued either until three contestants were "kept," or all but three had been "dumped." If the potential date received the golden ticket, then sometimes the host would show him or her to the picker.

=== Round 3 ===
The wall was removed from behind the Picker to reveal a walkway with several spaces behind him or her. The three finalists started on the back step, and were asked a series of two-choice questions. Each time a contestant's answer matched the Picker's, the player advanced one space on the walkway (occasionally, a question might be worth two steps). The first player to make it to the circle on which the Picker was sitting won a date with the Picker. In case of a tie, a final question was asked to the tying contestants, such as "How many girls did (Picker's name) say he dated last year?". The contestant who guessed the closest without going over won the date. On a few amusing occasions, the finalists visibly and audibly were not pleased by the looks or personality of the Picker, and were trying to guess the WRONG answers so they didn't have to go out with him, with one "winner" bluntly telling Chris Hardwick and Jenny McCarthy that she would not accept the date and walking off the set.

=== The Reveal ===
After a couple had been made, the two contestants were placed back-to-back while Hardwick read a description of the winning player to the Picker. The contestants were then turned around to meet each other for the first time, and their trip and prizes were described to them by the announcer.

Two games were played per show, first with a woman picking from 50 single men, then with a man picking from 50 single women.

=== Characters ===
Besides the hosts, the show also had mascot characters. The most prominent character, a scruffy, cigar-smoking cupid known as "Bob the Angel" (who mainly appears in the opening credits with a crown on its head), appeared in a series of vignettes with Hardwick and McCarthy. Bob would eventually be joined by a wife, Roberta, and a son, Little Bob. Bob the Angel also appeared in the opening credits of the YouTube version. Other characters included Fidel Castro and an evangelist. These characters would often interact with the contestants during the "Keep 'Em or Dump 'Em" round, such as one male contestant being challenged to a game of tetherball against Castro. On rare occasions celebrities would appear. A female Picker claimed she was a Mel Torme fan and challenged a contestant to sing like him, only to have the real Torme come and judge his work.

== Format (2018–2020) ==
The format in the 2018 revival is significantly different. The show has a hip hop/urban contemporary theme, with social media or Tinder elements. Also, LGBTQ contestants are featured.

As in the original version, the "Picker" is seated facing away from the audience. Fifty "singles" compete for the affection of The Picker. Twenty-five singles, referred to as "IRL" contestants, are in the studio, while the remaining 25 are "URL" contestants. Although the show implies that they are competing via the internet, the URL contestants are actually backstage, and represented by selfies on a giant plasma screen next to the IRL contestants. While the URL contestants compete alongside the IRL contestants, there is a possibility some of the URL contestants are illegitimate contestants, or Catfish. If a URL contestant is real, the selfie image on the screen is actually the person backstage. If a URL contestant is fake, their selfie is a stock image of an actor.

=== Round 1 ===
The Picker is presented with a large board of six categories to narrow down a contestant's attributes. Categories include physical attraction, mental attraction, hobbies and social media habits. Once a category is chosen, two or three choices are listed, and The Picker eliminates any contestant who falls under that trope. IRL contestants who were eliminated left the studio in view of the Picker, revealing themselves. URL contestants are also eliminated, out of sight of the Picker. This continues until eight or fewer IRL contestants remain and/or eight or fewer URL contestants remain.

=== Round 2 ===
The names of the IRL and URL contestants are revealed, and the IRL contestants are formally introduced and interviewed. The URL contestants are still only represented by their selfie avatar, and a Tinder-style profile is instead shown. At this time, the Picker is only allowed to choose one IRL and one URL contestant to move onto the following round. This is done by an activity or challenge the Picker asks the IRL contestants to do, and by various creative means for the URL contestants to do. For example, The Picker may ask the URL contestants to post an emoji they think is cute. URL contestants, although still only represented by their selfie, can interact by text messages and also sending a voice message. The eliminated IRL contestants leave the studio and are revealed to The Picker. The URL contestants are also eliminated sight unseen. Once one IRL and one URL contestant remain, they move onto the final round.

=== Round 3 ===
The Picker can now see the remaining IRL contestant, and they also see the avatar of the URL contestant. To aid in the Picker's choice, the contestants are asked questions that match those of a personality survey the Picker took before filming. The Picker then raises a cue card of their own choice, and each matching contestant is awarded a point. After the question round, The Picker makes a choice between the in-studio contestant and the URL contestant, who could be a catfish.

=== The Reveal ===
If the Picker chose the IRL contestant, they are simply matched together. However, if The Picker chose the URL contestant, they reveal themselves, and the Picker and the audience learn if they were genuine or a catfish. If the URL contestant was real, they are matched together as if they chose the IRL contestant. If the URL contestant is a catfish, The Picker usually is unhappy about this, however they can still decide to accept the catfish regardless.

== Merchandise ==
=== Book ===
In 1996, MTV Books published MTV's Singled Out Guide to Dating by Lynn Harris and J. D. Heiman, a dating-advice book based on the series. Mediaweek described the book as using a "he said, she said" format and noted that it included advice from the show's co-host Jenny McCarthy.

=== Home video ===
In 1996, Sony released Singled Out: The Dirt on the Dates, a home video following contestants from the series on dates arranged through the show.

== International versions ==
Country	Local name	Host	Co-Host	Network	Year aired
Brazil	Xaveco; Se Rolar...Rolou	Silvio Santos; Celso Portiolli	No co-host	SBT	1996–2001; 2003–2004; 2019–present
Denmark	Party Uartig	Tom Andkjær		TV 3	1995
Germany	Sommer sucht Sprosse	Nadine Krüger	Sebastian Radke	Sat.1	1997
Israel	Ha'hezi Hasheni	Nati Ravitz	Sigal Shachmon; Shirly Brener	ICP	1997–1999
Poland	Rykowisko	Łucja Kryńska	Paweł Cippert; Piotr Krzywiec	Polsat	1997-1998
Turkey	Çöpçatan	Burak Acer	Okan Karacan	Genç TV	1997–1998
United Kingdom	Singled Out	Sarah Cawood; Marc Crumpton	Richard Blackwood; Tess Daly	Channel 5	1998–2001
Italy	Kiss & Tell	Camila Raznovich	no cohost	MTV Italia	2006–2008
