= Rip Micheals =

American comedian

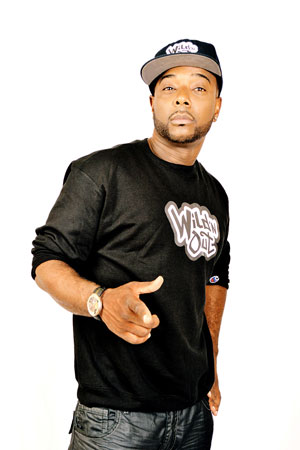
- Born: Chicago, Illinois, U.S.
- Occupations: Actor; comedian; writer
- Website: ripmicheals.com

Rip Micheals is an American comedian, best known as a cast member of the MTV improv comedy show, Nick Cannon Presents: Wild 'n Out. The comedian is known for his slapstick style of comedy. He also co-starred in the spin-off, Wild 'N On Tour.

== Career ==
Micheals was born and raised in Chicago, IL. As a teen, he performed at local clubs that would serve as his training ground. Following his college graduation at Purdue University, Micheals moved to New York to pursue his acting and comedy career.

Micheals was also a commentator on Centric’s According to Him + Her, where he weighed in with his comedic perspective on dating, social skills and sex. On that show, he coined the term "clatchet". He has appeared on NBC's Last Call with Carson Daly, Oxygen's Living with Funny, MSG Network Cheapin' it Real.

Micheals has been featured on Kevin Hart's streaming comedy platform, Laugh Out Loud (LOL) network.

== Personal life ==
On November 15, 2023, Micheals was hospitalized after suffering a heart attack.
