= Kid Saiyan =

American rapper and media personality

King Harris
- Born: Clifford Joseph "King" Harris III; August 25, 2004 (age 22); Atlanta, Georgia, U.S.
- Genres: Southern hip-hop
- Occupation: Rapper
- Instrument: Vocals
- Years active: 2021–present
- Labels: Wild Beast
- Children: 1
- Parents: T.I. (father); Tameka "Tiny" Harris (mother)

Clifford Joseph "King" Harris III (born August 25, 2004), known professionally as Kid Saiyan or King Harris, is an American rapper. He is the son of rapper T.I. and R&B singer Tameka "Tiny" Harris, and part of the Harris family, which has appeared on various reality television shows.

== Early life ==
Clifford Joseph "King" Harris III was born on August 25, 2004, in Atlanta, Georgia, to rapper T.I. and singer Tameka Cottle. He grew up in a large family, including half-siblings such as Zonnique Pullins, Messiah, Domani, and Deyjah, many of whom are active in music and entertainment. Harris graduated from Dutchtown High School in Hampton, Georgia.

Harris appeared on the VH1 reality series T.I. & Tiny: The Family Hustle with his family, which documented their personal and professional lives.

== Career ==
Harris began pursuing music under the stage name Kid Saiyan in 2020, experimenting with Trap music and melodic hip-hop through his initial singles, "Bout Dat" and "Bad Intentions." He followed with the EP A Thin Line Between a King & a Playa in 2021, featuring tracks like "Young Wild & Reckless" and "Bussdown," marking his transition from reality TV personality to recording artist.

In 2023, Kid Saiyan released a series of solo and collaborative singles, including "Father Likes Sons" with Domani,

After gaining exposure through his family's television success, Harris appeared in other media. He joined the improv comedy series Wild 'N Out, "Hellcat" with Tootie Raww, and "F*Ck It (Go Live)," along with the track "TWO TONE,".

== Controversies and legal issues ==
In September 2022, Harris was involved in a verbal altercation at a Waffle House in Atlanta that drew public attention after a video of the incident surfaced online. His parents later addressed the incident publicly, defending their son while acknowledging the challenges of growing up in the spotlight. Harris has also drawn attention for his outspoken use of social media, where he has clashed with critics and responded directly to commentary about his family.

In November 2023, Harris was involved in a widely publicized argument with his father, T.I., during a live-streamed family event. The dispute began during an Atlanta Falcons football game, where Harris appeared on Instagram Live while arguing with both of his parents about his upbringing. He claimed he had been raised primarily by his grandmother rather than in luxury, a statement that T.I. and Tameka "Tiny" Harris disputed in real time. T.I. later dismissed the incident as a common "family matter" in interviews, highlighting that disagreements between parents and children are typical.

In October 2024, Harris was arrested in Dunwoody, Georgia, after being pulled over while driving a BMW. Police reported that he nearly collided with a patrol car when leaving a gas station. Officers said they detected the odor of marijuana and found Harris carrying a firearm on his hip, which was removed without incident. He was detained on an outstanding bench warrant from Pickens County for failure to appear in court on prior charges dating back to August 2022, which included speeding, driving with a suspended license, and driving under the influence of drugs.

== Discography ==
=== Extended plays ===
List of EPs
Title	Music details	Year released
AThin Line Between A King & A Playa	Number of Tracks: 6; Formats: Streaming, digital download	2021
Wild ROCK$TAR$	Number of Tracks: 12; Label: Wild Beast Inc.; Formats: Streaming, digital download	2021
Too Lit	Number of Tracks: 6; Formats: Streaming, digital download	2025
Be Ready	Number of Tracks: 7; Label: Wild Beast Inc.; Formats: Streaming, digital download	2025

=== Singles ===
Title	Year	Album
"Bout Dat"	2020	Non-album single
"Bad Intentions"	2020	Non-album single
"Young Wild & Reckless"	2021	Non-album single
"Bussdown"	2021	Non-album single
"Father Likes Sons" (featuring Domani)	2023	Non-album single
"Hellcat" (featuring Tootie Raww)	2023	Non-album single
"F*Ck It (Go Live)"	2023	Non-album single
"Two Tone"	2023	Non-album single
"King Is Here"	2024	Non-album single
"Locked In"	2024	Non-album single
"Yadigg"	2024	Non-album single
"Standing On Business"	2024	Non-album single
"Dear Son"	2024	Non-album single
"The Wild"	2025	Non-album single

== Filmography ==
=== Television including reality television ===
Year	Title	Role / credit	Notes
2011–2017	T.I. & Tiny: The Family Hustle	Himself	Family reality show about T.I., Tiny, and their children.
2020	Wild 'N Out	Guest	Appeared in Season 14, Episode "King Harris; Young Nudy".
2021	Wash Wars	Performer / Guest Judge	In S3E3, "Somebody Must Win! King Harris Performs Hannah Montana".
2023	Dish Nation	Himself	Credited in episodes in 2023.

=== Music videos ===
Year	Title	Artists	Notes
2023	"Father Likes Sons"	Domani featuring Kid Saiyan	Appearance as himself
2023	"Hellcat"	Tootie Raww featuring Kid Saiyan	Appearance as himself
