= Book of Love (2002 film) =

- DVD cover
- Directed by: Jeffrey W. Byrd
- Written by: Jeffrey W. Byrd
- Produced by: Nedal Abdul; Tracey Baker-Simmons; Jeffrey W. Byrd; Carl Craig; Eric K. George; Luce Gordon; Nia Hill; D'Angela Steed; J. Steed
- Starring: Eric K. George; Anthony "Treach" Criss; Richard T. Jones; Robin Givens; Salli Richardson
- Narrated by: Anthony "Treach" Criss; Eric K. George; Richard T. Jones
- Cinematography: Carl Bartels
- Edited by: Jeffrey Cooper
- Music by: Stephen James Taylor
- Distributed by: Artisan Entertainment; Crossroads Pictures
- Release date: 2002
- Running time: 91 minutes
- Country: United States
- Language: English

Book of Love, also known as Book of Love: The Definitive Reason Why Men Are Dogs, is a 2002 American romantic comedy film, written and directed by Jeffrey W. Byrd, and starring Anthony "Treach" Criss, Eric K. George, and Richard T. Jones as its three male protagonists.

== Plot ==
Book of Love is a mockumentary following the unrelated stories of three L.A. bachelors (Eric K. George, Anthony "Treach" Criss, and Richard T. Jones) as they recover from a series of unhealthy relationships. The team of average Joes are no match for their manipulative girlfriends (Salli Richardson, Mari Morrow, and Robin Givens), however, and the over eager men are taken for all they're worth. It's this manipulative, self-serving treatment that drives the young bachelors into behaving like "dogs" themselves.

== Production ==
Written and directed by Jeffrey Byrd, Book of Love was produced by both BET Studios and 5th GearEntertainment, and eventually released by Strange Fruit Films. Three Black women co-produced the film.

== Cast ==
- Eric K. George — Will Hart
- Anthony "Treach" Criss — Jay Black
- Richard T. Jones — Ben Strong
- Salli Richardson — Karen
- Mari Morrow — Lyah
- Robin Givens — Iyanna
- Denise Dowse — Karen's Mom
- Reggie Theus — Carl
- Adam Clark — Derrick
- Angelle Brooks — Renee
- Dennis W. Hall — Man on toilet

=== Cameos ===
Cameo appearances in the film include: Darryl "Chill" Mitchell, Eric A. Payne, Flex Alexander, Gillian Iliana Waters, Jagged Edge, John Salley, Khalil Kain, Loretta Devine, Pepa (Salt-N-Pepa), Robert Townsend, and Taraji P. Henson.

== Premiere and reception ==
Book of Love's world premiere closed the 1999 Black Hollywood Film Festival.

A Variety review was largely positive, noting "Book of Love has the rhythms of a sketch-comedy movie, and, although it drags in places, most of the sketches are on the mark. The most uproarious sketches are also the most familiar, but the filmmakers add an impressive amount of freshness to oft-seen situations".

Kaia N. Shivers' review in Los Angeles Sentinel reads, "Though it is an outlet for wounded hearts and real life love drama, the story is a light comedy with intelligent and mature humor".
