= T.I. & Tiny: The Family Hustle =

- Genre: Reality
- Created by: Brian Sher; Cris Abrego; Stella Bulochnikov
- Starring: T.I.; Tameka "Tiny" Cottle-Harris; Zonnique Pullins; Messiah Harris; Domani Harris; Deyjah Harris; King Harris; Major Harris; Heiress Harris
- Theme music composer: Joël Angelo Margolis
- Opening theme: "Time Machine"
- Country of origin: United States
- Original language: English
- No. of seasons: 6
- No. of episodes: 100 (list of episodes)

Production
- Executive producers: Ben Samek; Brian Sher; Christian Sarabia; Cris Abrego; Jill Holmes; Kristen Kelly; Rabih Gholam; Stella Bulochnikov; Susan Levison; Kristen Kelly
- Running time: 20–23 minutes
- Production companies: 51 Minds Entertainment; Category 5 Entertainment

Original release
- Network: VH1
- Release: December 5, 2011 – May 29, 2017

Related
- T.I.'s Road to Redemption; Tiny & Shekinah's Weave Trip; T.I. & Tiny: Friends & Family Hustle

T.I. & Tiny: The Family Hustle is an American reality television series that aired on VH1 and premiered on December 5, 2011. The series concluded on May 29, 2017.

== Premise ==
The series chronicles the life of hip-hop artist T.I., his wife Tameka "Tiny" Cottle-Harris, and their six children. The first season follows the family after T.I.'s 12-month prison sentence. The third season encompasses T.I. as he promotes his album, Trouble Man: Heavy is the Head and his role in Identity Thief. Tiny is spending her time managing her girl group OMG Girlz, starting another girl group, and holding down the family home. The fourth season picks up after T.I. completed his America's Most Wanted Tour and acting on House of Lies. He returned to the family home in Atlanta. Tiny is working on achieving her G.E.D. and making sure OMG Girlz stays constant. The couple's oldest daughter, Niq Niq, is graduating from high school. Domani is working with Russell Simmons, Messiah continues to learn about fashion, and Deyjah gets a boyfriend.

== Episodes ==
Season	Episodes	Originally aired	
Season	Episodes	First aired	Last aired
1	14	December 5, 2011	March 12, 2012
2	17	September 3, 2012	December 17, 2012
3	18	April 8, 2013	October 14, 2013
4	22	March 31, 2014	November 25, 2014
5	21	June 1, 2015	September 19, 2016
6	8	April 17, 2017	May 29, 2017
