= Doggyland =

American YouTube channel for children

YouTube information
- Channel: Doggyland - Kids Songs & Nursery Rhymes
- Years active: 2022–present
- Genres: Education, nursery rhymes
- Subscribers: 1.2 million
- Views: 428.9 million
- Last updated: June 24, 2025
- Website: doggyland.net

Doggyland is a musical computer-animated children's YouTube channel co-created in 2022 by American rapper Snoop Dogg, Claude Brooks, producer and creator of Hip Hop Harry, and American singer October London. The channel specializes on a cast of colorful dogs that teach social, emotional, and cognitive skills through music aimed at small children, similar to most children's channels like Cocomelon.

The title of the YouTube channel is based on Dogg's song "Doggyland", from Tha Doggfather. It airs weekly on Tuesdays.

== Characters ==
- Bow Wizzle (voiced by Snoop Dogg), an adult mentor to the rest of the cast
- Wags (voiced by October London), a character that cheers his friends on
- Yap Yap, a high-spirited character with a positive and cheerful personality
- Zahra the toddler little rainbow puppy : is bow wow’s little puppy sister she has adhd and have feeding tube in her bellybutton and loves doing at home ballet and she even have her own ballet studio down in the basement and her best friends are yap yap and London and chow wow and she has a special mermaid necklace that she can transformed into a mermaid and her feeding tube is waterproof and she also goes to the same pediatric doctor office as yap yap
- Chow Wow, an emphatic
- team player
- Barks-A-Locks, a curious character that discovers new adventures

== Reception ==
Jenny Nixon of Common Sense Media gave the show 3 out of 5 stars, praising its narration and messages while noting that its "production value isn't exactly dazzling -- the characters and animation have a pretty generic look."
