= Live Your Life =

Live Your Life may refer to:

- Live Your Life (album), 2003 album by Versailles
- "Live Your Life" (Bomfunk MC's song), 2002
- "Live Your Life" (T.I. song), 2008
- "Live Your Life" from the Tulisa album The Female Boss, 2012
- "Live Your Life" (Yuna song), 2012
- "Live Your Life", song by Mika from Songbook Vol. 1
- "Live Your Life", song by White Lion from Return of the Pride

== See also ==
- Live Your Life Be Free, 1991 album by Belinda Carlisle
