= T.I. & Tiny: Friends & Family Hustle =

- Genre: Reality
- Country of origin: United States
- Original language: English
- No. of seasons: 3
- No. of episodes: 34

Production
- Executive producers: Tip "T.I." Harris; Tameka "Tiny" Harris; Brian Sher; Christian Sarabia; Vinnie Kaufmann; Jennifer McGrogan; Jordan Browne; Paula Aranda; Phakiso Collins; Daniel Blau Rogge
- Camera setup: Multi-camera
- Running time: 45-47 mins
- Production companies: Grand Hustle; Pretty Hustle; Crossover Entertainment; 51 Minds Entertainment; VH1 Productions

Original release
- Network: VH1
- Release: October 22, 2018 – June 29, 2020

Related
- T.I. & Tiny: The Family Hustle

T.I. & Tiny: Friends & Family Hustle is an American reality television series that aired on VH1 and premiered on October 22, 2018.

On March 26, 2020, it was announced that the third season would premiered on April 13, 2020. On January 13, 2021, the series was renewed for a fourth season, which was originally set to premiere in spring 2021. On February 5, 2021, it was announced that the series was suspended production due to sexual abuse allegations of T.I. and Tiny.

== Premise ==
The series chronicles the life of hip-hop artist T.I., his wife Tameka "Tiny" Cottle-Harris, their seven children and also the lives of their friends Monica, Toya Wright, and LeToya Luckett.

== Cast ==
- Tip "T.I." Harris
- Tameka “Tiny” Harris
- Zonnique “Niq Niq” Pullins
- Antonia “Toya” Wright
- Reginae Carter
- Monica Brown
- LeToya Luckett
- Tommicus Walker
- King Harris
- Major Harris
- Messiah Harris
- Heriress Harris
- Deyjah Harris
- Domani Harris (Seasons 1–2)

== Episodes ==
Season	Episodes	Originally released	
Season	Episodes	First released	Last released
1	10	October 22, 2018	December 17, 2018
2	12	April 15, 2019	July 1, 2019
3	12	April 13, 2020	June 29, 2020

=== Season 1 (2018) ===
No. overall	No. in season	Title	Original release date	U.S. viewers (millions)
1	1	"Atlanta's First Families"	October 22, 2018	1.34
2	2	"Art of Communication"	October 29, 2018	1.34
3	3	"Adulting"	November 5, 2018	1.35
4	4	"Boss Moms"	November 12, 2018	1.21
5	5	"Legacy"	November 19, 2018	1.12
6	6	"Voice for Change"	November 26, 2018	1.13
7	7	"Find a Way"	December 3, 2018	1.04
8	8	"Seizing the Moment"	December 10, 2018	1.08
9	9	"Making an Effort"	December 17, 2018	0.97
10	10	"New Chapter"	December 17, 2018	0.82

=== Season 2 (2019) ===
No. overall	No. in season	Title	Original release date	U.S. viewers (millions)
11	1	"In With the New"	April 15, 2019	1.06
12	2	"The Wheels Keep on Turning"	April 22, 2019	1.04
13	3	"Ryde or Die"	April 29, 2019	1.14
14	4	"A Precious Celebration"	May 6, 2019	1.01
15	5	"Mother's Love"	May 13, 2019	1.14
16	6	"Secrets and Commitment"	May 20, 2019	0.94
17	7	"Breaking News"	May 27, 2019	1.05
18	8	"Ohana"	June 3, 2019	1.06
19	9	"Don't Judge a Book"	June 10, 2019	0.93
20	10	"Looking Forward"	June 24, 2019	1.00
21	11	"Big Changes"	July 1, 2019	0.94
22	12	"A Leap of Faith"	July 1, 2019	0.89

=== Season 3 (2020) ===
No. overall	No. in season	Title	Original release date	U.S. viewers (millions)
23	1	"Empty Nesters"	April 13, 2020	1.22
24	2	"I'm a Boss Baby"	April 20, 2020	1.00
25	3	"Reset & Recharge"	April 27, 2020	0.90
26	4	"Speak Your Mind"	May 4, 2020	0.89
27	5	"Trials & Tribulations"	May 11, 2020	0.88
28	6	"Sisters in Sound"	May 18, 2020	0.66
29	7	"Look Who's Coming to ATL"	May 25, 2020	0.58
30	8	"Charitable Action"	June 1, 2020	0.59
31	9	"Big Things Are Coming"	June 8, 2020	0.50
32	10	"The Incident Part 1"	June 15, 2020	0.63
33	11	"The Incident Part 2"	June 22, 2020	0.53
34	12	"The Big Surprise"	June 29, 2020	0.69
