= B. Simone =

American comedian and social media personality (born 1990)

- Born: Braelyn Simone Greenfield; April 5, 1990 (age 36); Dallas, Texas, U.S.
- Occupations: Actress; comedian; entrepreneur; musician; social media personality
- Years active: 2016–present

Braelyn Simone Greenfield (born April 5, 1990), known professionally as B. Simone, is an American actress, comedian, entrepreneur, musician, and social media personality. She rose to prominence in 2017 when she joined the cast of the sketch comedy show Wild 'n Out.

== Career ==
Simone was born on April 5, 1990 in Dallas, Texas. She began performing at a young age, joining a girl group as a teenager. She began uploading music onto MySpace when she was 16 years old.

She grew up in the church, as her father Wesley Greenfield Jr. is the senior pastor of the Love Zion Baptist Church, in Columbus, Ohio. In her early twenties, Simone moved from Dallas, Texas to Atlanta, Georgia to further pursue a career as an entertainer, but never really embraced her religious upbringing, before becoming born again.

Simone rose to prominence in 2017 when she was cast in the ninth season of the sketch comedy and battle rap show Wild 'n Out. As of season 20 (2023), she has appeared in every season since her debut except seasons 10 and 17. Simone also released her debut album Stack Now Cry Later in 2017.

In 2020, Simone opened for Martin Lawrence as part of the "Lit AF Comedy Tour". She began her own comedy tour, the "Still Standing Tour", in May 2024.

Through posting her music, comedy clips, and life updates on social media, Simone has amassed a significant following on Instagram. As of May 2024, she has more than six million Instagram followers.

=== Business ventures ===
Simone launched a vegan and cruelty-free beauty brand, "B. Simone Beauty", in 2019. As of May 2024, the brand is on hiatus. In 2021, she collaborated with Footaction to release a clothing collection called "Faith Over Fear".

== Plagiarism controversy ==
In March 2020, Simone published a self-help book titled Baby Girl: Manifest the Life You Want. In June 2020, multiple social media users accused Simone of plagiarism, showing several examples where pages from Simone's book contained text nearly identical to that found in other books and Internet pages. Simone apologized and blamed the copied content on a company she hired to assist with writing the book. Sales of her book were paused due to the incident.

== Filmography ==
=== Film ===
Year	Title	Role	Notes
2016	#DigitalLivesMatter	Sasha	
2019	I Got the Hook Up 2	Angel	
2019	Dear Santa, I Need a Date	Erica	TV movie
2020	Ray Jr's Rent Due	Vanessa	
2020	Holiday Heartbreak	Young Summer	TV movie
2021	Hip Hop Family Christmas	Tiffany Harrington	TV movie
2022	Battlegrounds	Alyssa	
2022	Scheme Queens	Lauryn	
2022	Hip Hop Family Christmas Wedding	Tiffany Harrington	TV movie
2023	Stand Up	Shaniece	Short
2024	Killer Beat	Ms. Halo	TV movie

=== Television ===
Year	Title	Role	Notes
2017–present	Wild 'n Out	Herself/Cast Member	Main Cast: Season 9 & 11–16 & 18–present
2019	You're My Boooyfriend	Herself	Main Cast
2019	Girls Cruise	Herself	Main Cast
2019	Hip Hop Squares	Herself/Panelist	Recurring Panelist: Season 6
2022	Finding Happy	Yaz	Main Cast
2023	Terror Lake Drive	Chee Chee	Recurring Cast: Season 3
2023	Celebrity Squares	Herself	Recurring Panelist
2025	Harlem	Carli	Episode: “Can We Talk… For a Minute”

=== Music video ===
Year	Song	Artist	Notes
2020	"Find My Way"	DaBaby	Female Lead
