= Being Bobby Brown =

Reality television series

- Genre: Reality
- Starring: Bobby Brown; Whitney Houston; Bobbi Kristina Brown
- Country of origin: United States
- Original language: English
- No. of seasons: 1
- No. of episodes: 11

Production
- Executive producers: Bobby Brown; Frances Berwick; Rachel Smith; Tommy Brown; Tracey Baker-Simmons; Wanda Shelley
- Production location: Atlanta, Georgia
- Running time: 20 minutes
- Production companies: B2 Entertainment; Brownhouze Entertainment

Original release
- Network: Bravo
- Release: June 30 – December 21, 2005

Being Bobby Brown is an American reality television series that debuted on Bravo on June 30, 2005.

== Premise ==
The series depicts the life of R&B singer Bobby Brown, his then-wife, pop/R&B superstar Whitney Houston, and their family. The program showcases the family's home time, along with shopping at the famed Harrods of London (where they met with the owner Mohamed Al-Fayed), and vacationing in the Bahamas.

The program ran on Thursdays, but on occasion aired several times through the week. The series was extremely popular throughout its run and received the highest ratings ever for the Bravo network. The show also continued Houston's unbroken string of hit motion pictures and television projects. The highly rated show ran for only one season and ended after Houston stated she would not appear in a second season; thus, Bravo and Brown could not reach an agreement to continue the show.

== Episodes ==
No.	Title	Original release date
1	"Brown Family Vacation"	June 30, 2005
2	"The Past Is the Past"	June 30, 2005
3	"Creatures of the Forest"	July 7, 2005
4	"At Home with the Browns"	July 14, 2005
5	"Happy Mother's Day"	July 21, 2005
6	"Parenting 101"	July 28, 2005
7	"Bobby Does London"	August 4, 2005
8	"Lights, Camera, Bobby"	August 11, 2005
9	"Bravo"	August 18, 2005
10	"The Clip Show"	August 25, 2005
11	"Christmas with the Browns"	December 21, 2005

== Home media and international broadcast ==
In Italy, it was shown on 7 Gold under the title "Bobby Brown - Vite familiari" from December 15, 2014, to February 2, 2015, in the afternoon slot. Although it was initially slated for broadcast on Telecapri News in 2007, the series was not aired there and remained unaired in Italy for seven years.

In Romania, the show aired on Antena 1 with the title "Familia Brown".

In Poland, it has been airing occasionally on Polsat JimJam since 2024, with the title "Bycie Bobby Brown."

The series has not been released on DVD and a spokesperson for Bravo has told various news outlets that the series will be kept in the Bravo archives.

The rights to the series are currently held by NBC Universal.

== In popular culture ==
Houston popularized the phrase "Hell to the no" on the series and was nominated for a VH-1 "Big In '05 Award" for "Quote of the Year". This phrase also appeared on T-shirts. The Soup television series also featured Houston loudly shouting "Kiss my ass!" as a running gag, naming it its "Clip of the Year".

== Reception ==
Entertainment Weekly gave the series a good review with a grade of "B" and commented on how relaxed the couple is with each other and the cameras filming their every move.

One reviewer, Barry Garron, however, wrote that "'Being Bobby Brown', the reality show spotlighting the R&B singer whose rap sheet might be longer than his catalog, is undoubtedly the most disgusting and execrable series ever to ooze its way onto television." Garron also noted that the show contained remarks regarding sexual and excretory functions.

Despite the so-called train-wreck nature of the show, the series was extremely popular, winning its time slot, and gave Bravo its highest ratings ever.
