= OMG Girlz =

American teen pop girl group

- Origin: Atlanta, Georgia, U.S.
- Genres: R&B; pop; hip hop
- Years active: 2009–present
- Labels: Grand Hustle; Interscope; Pretty Hustle
- Members: Zonnique Pullins; Bahja Rodriguez; Breaunna Womack
- Past members: Reginae Carter; Lourdes Rodriguez
- Website: Official Website

The OMG Girlz is an American R&B/pop girl group. Formed in 2009, by Tameka "Tiny" Cottle, the Atlanta-based girl group performed publicly for the first time on an episode of BET's Tiny and Toya reality television series. They also have made appearances on the 2012 series T.I. & Tiny: The Family Hustle. Their mission is to inspire women throughout the world and let them know they could stand together as friends, teens, and young women. They are best known for their singles "Can't Stop Loving You", "Where the Boys At?", and "Gucci This (Gucci That)".

On December 31, 2017, the OMG Girlz reunited on stage for the first time in 2 years to perform as a special guest during Zonnique's opening set on the Great Xscape Tour with Xscape.

On July 12, 2023, The OMG Girlz officially reunited as a group. They announced the release date of their long awaited single Lover Boy.

== History ==
=== 2009–2010: Beginnings and departures ===
Prior to the group's debut, Zonnique Jailee Pullins (daughter of Tameka "Tiny" Harris then Cottle) was a member of the duo group QT Posse with QT Jazz. QT Posse later disbanded and OMG Girlz was formed. This new group consisted of four members Zonnique "Star" Pullins, sisters Bahja "Beauty" and Lourdes "Lolo" Rodriguez, and Reginae "Baby" Carter whose parents were all close friends with Zonnique's mother.

Shortly after the release of their first single "Ain't Nobody" in 2010, Reginae "Baby Carter" Carter (daughter of rapper Lil Wayne and Toya Carter) departed from the group. A few months later, OMG Girlz's second single "Haterz" (stylized as H.A.T.E.R.Z) was released. OMG later performed the single on Good Day Atlanta. The group downsized once more after Lourdes "Lolo" Rodriguez left the group given her young age. Afterwards this left the group as a duo consisting of members "Beauty" and "Star" only.

While searching for a third member, the fourth single "So Official" was released. Shortly after OMG had pinned the newest addition to the group Breaunna "Babydoll" Womack due to finding her on a YouTube video dancing to Beyoncé's song "Ego".

=== 2011–2013: New Beginning, tours, signed, and breakthrough ===
In 2011, the girls were added to the Scream Tour: Next Generation lineup, by way of a national contest, which featured Diggy Simmons, Mindless Behavior, Jacob Latimore, Jawan Harris, and TK-N-Cash. This tour helped the group get fans across the country. Their first single as a trio, "Gucci This (Gucci That)" was a featured song on the tour. After the tour was over in December 2011, the OMG Girlz were signed to Interscope/Streamline Records via Pretty Hustle/Grand Hustle (labels by Tameka "Tiny" Harris & Clifford "T.I.P" Harris). The following year on February 28, 2012, "Gucci This (Gucci That)" was released as their first official single under Interscope/Streamline Records, available for public download. On April 28, 2012, it peaked at No. 59 on two of Billboard's charts R&B/Hip-Hop Airplay for 10 weeks and Hot R&B/Hip-Hop Songs for 13 weeks.

Their second single "Where the Boys At?" which was written by fellow young artists Lil Will and Trevante was released on June 12, 2012. On July 14, 2012, it peaked at No. 77 on Billboard's Hot R&B/Hip-Hop Songs chart and stayed on the chart for 5 weeks.

While performing on tour they previewed a song called "Lover Boy", the unreleased song would later on become the group's most highly anticipated single.

OMG made several cameo appearances for various artists, one being in T.I.'s music video for "Hello".

In Fall 2013, their singles "Can't Stop Loving You", and "Baddie" were released.

In Summer 2013, two days before they were scheduled to begin the All Around the World tour with teen pop boy group Mindless Behavior, they released three singles titled "Do You Remember", "Incredimazable", and "Ridin' Slow".

=== 2014–2015: Maturity and disbandment ===
In Spring 2014, the group released their first mature single called "Boy It's Over" (which samples the R&B group Jagged Edge single "Girl It's Over" from their third studio album Jagged Little Thrill).

On March 12, 2015, OMG had unexpectedly announced that they would not be pursuing a career as a group on their official Instagram account. Since the disbandment, each member has since put out personal solo projects.

=== 2017–present: Reunion ===
After their reunion on the Great Xscape Tour, the band has gone back into the studio to record new music. In May 2023, the band returned to the studio to record their anticipated single, "Lover Boy." On June 17, OMG announced that Lover Boy was set to be released on July 14, 2023. The group also announced that their album is scheduled to be released in Fall 2023. OMG attended the BET Awards ceremony in 11 years on June 25, 2023. On Tuesday, July 11, 2023, OMG released the official cover of their single "Lover Boy". "Lover Boy" was released on July 14, 2023. It is the group's first single in over 10 years.

Most of all, OMG Girlz attended Beyoncé's Renaissance World Tour at Mercedes Benz Stadium on August 14.

On May 3, 2024, OMG Girlz announced that they will be joining Xscape and SWV for the Queens of R&B Tour.

On tour, OMG Girlz perform “Where the Boys At?”, “Baddie”, “Gucci This (Gucci That)”, a new single called “Motion”, and a dance break routine to GloRilla’s “TGIF.”

On July 29, 2024, OMG Girlz added new dates through the rest of the tour.

OMG Girlz new single, “Motion” was released on August 2, 2024, on Bahja’s birthday.

In September 2024, T.I. and Tiny won a $71 million lawsuit against MGA Entertainment, the company behind L.O.L. Surprise! O.M.G. dolls. The lawsuit, filed in 2020, claimed MGA violated the intellectual property rights of the couple's music group, the OMG Girlz, by copying their image and likeness for more than a dozen dolls. The court found that MGA's dolls infringed on the trade dress and misappropriated the likeness of the band.

Their second single, “Make a Scene” was released on March 28, 2025.

== Solo careers ==
=== Beauty ===
Bahja Shamoni Rodriguez (born August 2, 1996)

In April 2015, Bahja "Beauty" Rodriguez released a video on her YouTube account, introducing herself as a solo artist. She also explained in an interview, reasons why OMG may have disbanded.

She released her debut EP, It Gets Better on November 20, 2015. On December 12, it peaked at No. 22 position on Billboard's Top R&B Albums and peaked at No. 10 position on Billboard's Heatseekers Albums. It stayed on the charts for one week.

As of December 2018, Rodriguez has released four EPs and five non-album singles via iTunes and other Music streaming outlets The "Jealous Type" singer also did a cover shoot for DOPE Magazine.

Discography

Mixtapes

• TBA (2020)

EPs

• It Gets Better (2015)

• LUV (2016)

• Take 3 (2018)

• Coldest Winter (2018)

• Is This Love ? (2019)

Non-album Singles

• Jealous Type (2015)

• Lipstick (2015)

• Next One (2015)

• Get the Money (2016)

• Necessary (2017)

=== Star ===
Zonnique Jailee Pullins (born March 20, 1996)

On June 23, 2015, Zonnique "Star" Pullins released the single "Nun For Free" featuring Atlantic Records rapper Young Thug. She also released four additional singles that same year and another single in 2016.

Zonnique released her debut EP, "Love Jones" on March 24, 2017. She later released visuals for the lead single of "Love Jones", "Should've Been" August 23, 2017, and visuals for "Patience" following October 5, 2017. In 2017 she announced she would be joining Growing Up Hip Hop: Atlanta, and would be joining her mother Tameka Cottle and her group Xscape for The Great Xscape Tour alongside Tamar Braxton, Monica, and June's Diary.

Discography

EPs

• Love Jones (2017)

• The Break Up (2023)

Non-album Singles

• Nun For Free (featuring Young Thug) (2015)

• Cool Kids (2015)

• My Nigga (2015)

• Heartbreak Kid (2015)

• Can't Trust Em (2015)

• Worst Friday (2016)

• Winner (2020)

• #FTCU (2020)

=== Babydoll ===
Breaunna Womack (born March 23, 1995)

On June 5, 2015, a song titled "Don't Believe In Love (Remix)" was uploaded to SoundCloud via Mindless Behavior member Princeton. The song features vocals from Breaunna "Babydoll" Womack credited as "JusBre".

Womack released two singles, "Only in America" and "Selfish" under the new stage name.

Discography

Non-album Singles

• Only in America (2016)

• Selfish (2017)

• Workin' with Somethin (2020)

== Awards and nominations ==
Award	Category	Result
2013 44th NAACP Image Awards	Outstanding New Artist	Nominated
