= Tameka Cottle =

American R&B singer

- Also known as: Tiny, Tameka Harris
- Born: Tameka Dianne Cottle; July 14, 1975 (age 51); College Park, Georgia, U.S.
- Genres: R&B; soul
- Occupations: Singer; songwriter; television personality
- Years active: 1990–present
- Labels: Sony BMG; Grand Hustle Equity Roc Nation
- Spouse: T.I. (m. 2010)

Tameka Dianne Cottle-Harris (née Cottle; born July 14, 1975), known professionally by her nickname Tiny, is an American singer. She rose to fame in the 1990s as a member of the multi-platinum R&B vocal group Xscape. She received a Grammy Award for her writing contributions on the TLC hit "No Scrubs".

== Early life ==
Cottle was born in College Park, Georgia, to a white (British-American) mother, Dianne Cottle (b. 1945) and a black (African-American) father, Albert Cottle but he died early in her life. She was raised by Charles "Speedy" Pope (1936–2013) of whom she considers her father. Cottle's father and her uncle, Joseph Pope (1933–1996), formed the R&B group The Tams.

== Career ==
In teen years, Cottle joined the female R&B quartet Xscape in 1990 while attending Tri-Cities Performing Arts High School. Xscape was discovered by producer Jermaine Dupri while singing at his birthday celebration in Atlanta, Georgia. Dupri immediately signed the group to his then-new record label, So So Def Recordings.

As a member of the group, Cottle has contributed to three of the group's platinum albums: Hummin' Comin' at 'Cha, Off the Hook, and Traces of My Lipstick. As a member of Xscape, she has received two Soul Train Music Awards for Best New R&B Artist and Best R&B Album and the A-Town Music Award for Best Duo/Group. Cottle sang lead vocals on six of Xscape's hit singles: "Understanding", "Do You Want To?", "All I Need", "Love's a Funny Thing", "My Little Secret", and "Am I Dreamin'". She has also recorded on soundtracks for films: The Baby-Sitters Club, Sunset Park, The Mask, Soul Food, Panther, Bad Boys, and Love Jones. In 1998, after the release of Xscape's third album, Traces of My Lipstick, the band parted ways.

In 2000, Cottle and fellow ex-Xscape group member Kandi Burruss were honored with a Grammy Award for Best R&B Song for penning TLC's hit single "No Scrubs". Cottle's other accomplishments include an American Society of Composers, Authors and Publishers award in the R&B and Pop Music categories for "No Scrubs", as well as the ASCAP Rap Award for her work on the Sporty Thievz track "No Pigeons". Cottle has also worked with her husband T.I., 8Ball & MJG, Lil' Kim and Bow Wow.

After a five-year hiatus, Cottle reunited with sisters LaTocha and Tamika Scott and added a new member, Kiesha Miles (replacing Kandi), to release a Xscape album entitled Unchained as well as the single, "What's Up", in 2005.

Cottle is involved in a project with Kiesha Miles called the OMG Girlz. Cottle's daughter, Zonnique, is a part of the musical trio, along Bahja and others. She appeared in her husband's video for "Hello" (feat. Cee Lo), along with their family and the OMG Girlz.

In June 2009, Cottle's reality TV series, Tiny and Toya, made its first premiere on BET, but cancelled in 2010.

On July 22, 2014, Tameka returned to the music industry under her new label Pretty Hustle, with her first solo single "What The F*** You Gon Do?". Within a few hours of "WTFYGD" being released it reached the #5 spot on the iTunes R&B/Soul charts, and less than 24 hours after release it became the #1 song on the charts for the genre.

In 2017, she and her bandmate Kandi Burruss were granted writing credits on the sampled song Shape of You by Ed Sheeran.

In 2018, Cottle took a break from her XSCAP3 EP promo to spend some quality time with her one-year-old daughter Heiress. In 2022, Cottle reunited with Xscape for a performance at the Soul Train Music Awards.

In March 2023, Cottle appeared in the Bravo reality television series SWV & Xscape: The Queens of R&B.

== Personal life ==
In 2001, Cottle began dating hip-hop rapper T.I. Cottle and T.I. married on July 30, 2010, in Miami Beach, Florida. They have three children together, King C'Andre Harris (born August 25, 2004), Major Philant Harris (born May 16, 2008), and Heiress Diana Harris (born March 26, 2016). Their first daughter was stillborn in March 2007, six months into a complicated pregnancy. Cottle also has an older daughter named Zonnique Jailee Pullins from her past relationship with Zonnie "Zeboe" Pullins. Through her marriage to T.I., Cottle has three stepchildren, Messiah, Domani, and Deyjah Harris.

From December 2011 until early 2017, T.I. & Tiny: The Family Hustle premiered on VH1. The series chronicles the lives of Cottle and T.I. along with their children.

Cottle's father, Charles Pope, died on July 11, 2013, at the age of 76 after a long battle with Alzheimer's disease.

Tiny and Shekinah's Weave Trip premiered on VH1 on October 13, 2014. The series chronicles Cottle and her best friend, Shekinah Anderson, in a mobile hair salon across the country.

In December 2016, Cottle filed for divorce from T.I. after six years of marriage. However, the couple worked on healing their marriage in 2017 after Tiny spent time with her group Xscape, and Tiny dropped the divorce files stating, "The divorce is off."

In 2017, it was announced Cottle would own the "Atlanta Heirs" basketball team under the newly-developed Global Mixed Gender Basketball league, which was founded by Louisiana-based rapper Master P. Cottle's team would be a part of its inaugural debut on September 23, 2017, in a neutral match at the Cox Pavilion in Las Vegas, Nevada, against Master P's own squad, the New Orleans Gators.

In 2024, Cottle's daughter Heiress Harris collaborated with five-year-old VanVan on a song titled Be You.

=== Legal issues ===
On September 1, 2010, Cottle and T.I. were arrested following a motor vehicle stop in Los Angeles, CA. The police reported that an odor of burnt marijuana was coming from the vehicle and the couple was found to be in possession of a controlled substance, ecstasy. They posted $10,000 bail.

In 2021, Cottle and her husband T.I. faced sexual assault allegations, with attorney Tyrone A. Blackburn accusing the two and their associates of "forced drugging, kidnapping, rape, and intimidation" in at least two states, including California and Georgia. Blackburn sent letters to the state attorney general of California and Georgia asking them to open an investigation. Cottle and Harris denied the allegations.

== Discography ==
Singles

| Year | Title |
|---|---|
| 2019 | "What The F**k You Gon Do?" |
| 2019 | "I Fuckin <3 U" |

Writing credits

| Year | Song | Artist |
|---|---|---|
| 1995 | "Feels So Good" | Xscape |
| 1995 | "Hard to Say Goodbye" | Xscape |
| 1995 | "Can't Hang" | Xscape |
| 1995 | "What Can I Do" | Xscape |
| 1995 | "Do Like Lovers Do" | Xscape |
| 1995 | "Love's a Funny Thing" | Xscape |
| 1999 | "No Scrubs" | TLC |
| 1999 | "Just Cuz" | Tamar Braxton |
| 1999 | "No Pigeons" | Sporty Thievz |
| 2000 | "Easier" | Kandi |
| 2004 | "Can I Walk By" | Jazze Pha |
| 2005 | "What's Up" | Xscape |
| 2012 | "Gucci This (Gucci That)" | The OMG Girlz |
| 2012 | "No Angels" | Bastille |
| 2014 | "Dance With Me" | Le Youth |
| 2017 | "Shape of You" | Ed Sheeran |
| 2018 | "Memory Lane" | Xscape |
| 2019 | "SOS" | Avicii |
| 2019 | "Looking for Somebody" | Trobi |
| 2019 | "Don Walk" | Stefflon Don |
| 2021 | "Skrubs" | Lil Durk |
| 2021 | "Scrub" | Sleepy Hallow |
| 2021 | "Bobo" | Mariah Angeliq |
| 2023 | "What It Is (Block Boy)" | Doechii |
| 2023 | "More" | Elijah Blake |
| 2023 | "Lover Boy" | The OMG Girlz |
