= Lil Mama discography =

This article lists the discography of American rapper Lil Mama.

== Albums ==
=== Studio albums ===
List of studio albums with selected chart positions
Title	Album details	Peak chart positions				Sales
Title	Album details	US	US R&B /HH	US Rap	JPN	Sales
VYP (Voice of the Young People)	Released: April 29, 2008; Label: Jive; Formats: CD, digital download	25	5	3	19	US: 442,000

=== Mixtapes ===
List of mixtapes
Title	Mixtape details
Take Me Back	Released: December 18, 2015; Label: Self-released; Format: Streaming

== Singles ==
=== As lead artist ===
List of singles, with selected chart positions and certifications, showing year released and album name
Title	Year	Peak chart positions								Certifications	Album
Title	Year	US	US R&B	US Rap	AUS	CAN	JPN	NZ	UK	Certifications	Album
"Lip Gloss"	2007	10	36	16	—	—	—	—	121	RIAA: Gold; RIAA: Gold (Mastertone)	VYP (Voice of the Young People)
"G-Slide (Tour Bus)"	2007	—	—	—	—	—	—	8	—		VYP (Voice of the Young People)
"Shawty Get Loose" (featuring Chris Brown and T-Pain)	2008	10	43	13	41	38	31	3	57	RMNZ: Gold	VYP (Voice of the Young People)
"What It Is (Strike a Pose)" (featuring T-Pain)	2008	—	—	—	—	—	—	—	—		VYP (Voice of the Young People)
"Doughboy" (featuring Mishon Ratliff)	2010	—	—	—	—	—	—	—	—		Non-album singles
"Hustler Girl" (featuring Shawn Marvel, Mitch and A Dot)	2010	—	—	—	—	—	—	—	—		Non-album singles
"Scrawberry"	2011	—	—	—	—	—	—	—	—		Non-album singles
"NY NY LA LA" (featuring Snoop Dogg)	2011	—	—	—	—	—	—	—	—		Non-album singles
"On & On & On"	2011	—	—	—	—	—	—	—	—		Non-album singles
"Bad as Me"	2012	—	—	—	—	—	—	—	—		Fiya House Mixtape Volume 1 New York Edition
"Sausage"	2015	—	—	—	—	—	—	—	—		Take Me Back
"Too Fly"	2015	—	—	—	—	—	—	—	—		Take Me Back
"Summer Sixteen (Views)"	2016	—	—	—	—	—	—	—	—		Non-album singles
"WORK"	2016	—	—	—	—	—	—	—	—		Non-album singles
"4pm"	2016	—	—	—	—	—	—	—	—		Non-album singles
"Shoe Game"	2018	—	—	—	—	—	—	—	—		Non-album singles
"—" denotes a recording that did not chart or was not released in that territory.

=== As featured artist ===
Title	Year	Album
"Girlfriend (Dr. Luke Remix)" (Avril Lavigne featuring Lil Mama)	2007	The Best Damn Thing
"Sexiest" (Yahaira featuring Lil Mama)	2010	Non-album singles
"Billionaire" (Prince Malik featuring Jim Jones and Lil Mama)	2010	Non-album singles
"Turn It Up" (Mishon Ratliff featuring Roscoe Dash and Lil Mama)	2010	Non-album singles
"Ball" (MC Lyte featuring Lil Mama & AV)	2014	Legend
"Call Me When You're Lonely" (Drake Bell featuring Lil Mama)	2018	Non-album singles

=== Promotional singles ===
List of promotional singles, showing year released and album name
Title	Year	Album
"L.I.F.E."	2008	VYP (Voice of the Young People)

== Guest appearances ==
List of non-single guest appearances, with other performing artists, showing year released and album name
Title	Year	Other performer(s)	Album
"Amazed"	2008	Vanessa Hudgens	Identified
"Baby Baby"	2008	Karina Pasian	First Love
"Block Party"	2009	Lisa Lopes	Eye Legacy
"Video Chat"	2010	College Boyys	Spring Break
"Big Boy Rims"	2010	College Boyys	Spring Break
"Cupid"	2010	College Boyys	Spring Break
