= 2007 Teen Choice Awards =

American awards ceremony held in California

- Date: August 26, 2007
- Location: Gibson Amphitheatre, Universal City, California
- Hosted by: Hilary Duff and Nick Cannon

Television/radio coverage
- Network: Fox

The 2007 Teen Choice Awards ceremony was held on August 26, 2007, at the Gibson Amphitheatre, Universal City, California. The event was hosted by Hilary Duff and Nick Cannon with Kelly Clarkson, Avril Lavigne, Fergie, and Shop Boyz as performers. Justin Timberlake received the Ultimate Choice Award.

== Performers ==
- Avril Lavigne – "Girlfriend"
- Kelly Clarkson – "Never Again"
- Fergie – "Big Girls Don't Cry"
- Shop Boyz – "Party Like a Rockstar"

== Presenters ==
- Megan Fox and Dwayne Johnson • Presented Choice Comedy TV Actor
- Ryan Reynolds and Nikki Blonsky • Presented Choice Breakout Movie Actor
- Jonas Brothers and Miley Cyrus • Presented Choice R&B Track
- Sum 41 • Introduced Avril Lavigne
- Jared Padalecki • Presented Choice TV Movie
- Eve and David Spade • Presented Choice Movie Hissy Fit
- Ashley Jensen and America Ferrera • Presented Choice Male Hottie and Choice Female Hottie
- David Boreanaz and Emily Deschanel • Introduced Kelly Clarkson
- Michael Cera, Jonah Hill, and Christopher Mintz-Plasse • Presented Ultimate Choice
- Jason Lee and Justin Long • Presented Choice Comedian
- Apolo Anton Ohno and Jordin Sparks • Presented Choice V-Cast Video
- Bow Wow and Omarion • Introduced Keke Palmer and Emmy Rossum
- Keke Palmer and Emmy Rossum • Introduced Fergie
- Chingy, Ludacris, and Greg Oden • Presented Choice Comedy Movie Actress
- Adrianne Palicki and Taylor Kitsch • Presented Choice Comedy TV Actress
- Jessica Alba and Dane Cook • Presented Choice Summer Movie: Comedy

== Winners and nominees ==
Winners are listed first and highlighted in bold text.

=== Movies ===
Choice Action Movie	Choice Action Movie Actor
**Pirates of the Caribbean: At World's End**; 300; Fantastic Four: Rise of the Silver Surfer; Spider-Man 3; Transformers	**Johnny Depp – Pirates of the Caribbean: At World's End**; Orlando Bloom – Pirates of the Caribbean: At World's End; Chris Evans – Fantastic Four: Rise of the Silver Surfer; Shia LaBeouf – Transformers; Tobey Maguire – Spider-Man 3
Choice Action Movie Actress	Choice Drama Movie
**Keira Knightley – Pirates of the Caribbean: At World's End**; Jessica Alba – Fantastic Four: Rise of the Silver Surfer; Kirsten Dunst – Spider-Man 3; Megan Fox – Transformers; Lena Headey – 300	**The Pursuit of Happyness**; The Departed; The Guardian; Step Up; Stomp the Yard
Choice Drama Movie Actor	Choice Drama Movie Actress
**Will Smith – The Pursuit of Happyness**; Leonardo DiCaprio – The Departed & Blood Diamond; Ashton Kutcher – The Guardian; Adam Sandler – Reign Over Me; Channing Tatum – Step Up	**Jennifer Hudson – Dreamgirls**; Meagan Good – Stomp the Yard; Scarlett Johansson – The Black Dahlia & The Prestige; Angelina Jolie – A Mighty Heart; Lindsay Lohan – Bobby & Georgia Rule
Choice Comedy Movie	Choice Comedy Movie Actor
**Knocked Up**; Blades of Glory; Evan Almighty; Night at the Museum; Ocean's Thirteen	**Will Ferrell – Talladega Nights: The Ballad of Ricky Bobby & Blades of Glory**; Sacha Baron Cohen – Talladega Nights: The Ballad of Ricky Bobby & Borat; Steve Carell – Evan Almighty; Jon Heder – School for Scoundrels & Blades of Glory; Ben Stiller – Night at the Museum
Choice Comedy Movie Actress	Choice Horror/Thriller Movie
**Sophia Bush – John Tucker Must Die**; Katherine Heigl – Knocked Up; Kate Hudson – You, Me and Dupree; Emma Roberts – Nancy Drew; Jessica Simpson – Employee of the Month	**Disturbia**; 1408; Hostel: Part II; The Number 23; Saw III
Choice Horror/Thriller Movie Actor	Choice Horror/Thriller Movie Actress
**Shia LaBeouf – Disturbia**; Jim Carrey – The Number 23; Josh Duhamel – Turistas; Ryan Gosling – Fracture; Jake Gyllenhaal – Zodiac	**Sophia Bush – The Hitcher**; Jessica Biel – Next; Jordana Brewster – The Texas Chainsaw Massacre: The Beginning; Elisha Cuthbert – Captivity; Amber Tamblyn – The Grudge 2
Choice Chick Flick	Choice Movie Villain
**The Holiday**; Georgia Rule; The Last Kiss; License to Wed; Music and Lyrics	**Bill Nighy – Pirates of the Caribbean: At World's End**; Topher Grace – Spider-Man 3; Julian McMahon – Fantastic Four: Rise of the Silver Surfer; Al Pacino – Ocean's Thirteen; Hugo Weaving – Transformers
Choice Breakout Movie Actor	Choice Breakout Movie Actress
**Shia LaBeouf – Disturbia & Transformers**; Chris Brown – Stomp the Yard; Justin Long – Accepted, Idiocracy, & Live Free or Die Hard; Jaden Smith – The Pursuit of Happyness; Justin Timberlake – Alpha Dog & Black Snake Moan	**Sophia Bush – John Tucker Must Die & The Hitcher**; Rachel Bilson – The Last Kiss; Megan Fox – Transformers; Jennifer Hudson – Dreamgirls; Emma Roberts – Nancy Drew
Choice Movie Chemistry	Choice Movie Liplock
**Will Smith & Jaden Smith – The Pursuit of Happyness**; George Clooney, Casey Affleck, Scott Caan, Don Cheadle, Matt Damon, Elliott Gould, Eddie Jemison, Bernie Mac, Brad Pitt, Shaobo Qin, Carl Reiner, Eddie Izzard, Andy García – Ocean's Thirteen; Will Ferrell & Jon Heder – Blades of Glory; Shia LaBeouf & Mark Ryan – Transformers; Seth Rogen & Paul Rudd – Knocked Up	**Orlando Bloom & Keira Knightley – Pirates of the Caribbean: At World's End**; Jamie Foxx & Beyoncé – Dreamgirls; Hugh Grant & Drew Barrymore – Music and Lyrics; Shia LaBeouf & Megan Fox – Transformers; Tobey Maguire & Kirsten Dunst – Spider-Man 3
Choice Movie Hissy Fit	Choice Movie Rumble
**Ryan Seacrest – Knocked Up**; Jessica Alba – Fantastic Four: Rise of the Silver Surfer; Steve Carell – Evan Almighty; Cameron Diaz – The Holiday; Will Ferrell – Blades of Glory	**Orlando Bloom vs. The Flying Dutchman Crew – Pirates of the Caribbean: At World's End**; Josh Duhamel vs. Blackout – Transformers; Chris Evans vs. Julian McMahon – Fantastic Four: Rise of the Silver Surfer; Tobey Maguire & James Franco vs. Topher Grace & Thomas Haden Church – Spider-Man 3; The Spartans vs. The Immortals – 300
Choice Movie Dance	Choice Movie Scream
**Channing Tatum & Jenna Dewan – Step Up**; Ioan Gruffudd – Fantastic Four: Rise of the Silver Surfer; Jon Heder & Will Ferrell – Blades of Glory; Tobey Maguire – Spider-Man 3; Columbus Short – Stomp the Yard	**Steve Carell – Evan Almighty**; Kate Beckinsale – Vacancy; Jordana Brewster – The Texas Chainsaw Massacre: The Beginning; Jonah Hill – Accepted; Arielle Kebbel – The Grudge 2
Choice Summer Movie: Action	Choice Summer Movie: Comedy/Musical
**Harry Potter and the Order of the Phoenix**; The Bourne Ultimatum; Fantastic Four: Rise of the Silver Surfer; Live Free or Die Hard; Transformers	**Hairspray**; I Now Pronounce You Chuck and Larry; Rush Hour 3; The Simpsons Movie; Superbad

=== Television ===
Choice Drama TV Show	Choice Drama TV Actor
**Grey's Anatomy**; Heroes; House; Kyle XY; Lost	**Hugh Laurie – House**; Matthew Fox – Lost; Wentworth Miller – Prison Break; Jared Padalecki – Supernatural; Milo Ventimiglia – Heroes
Choice Drama TV Actress	Choice Comedy TV Show
**Hayden Panettiere – Heroes**; Emily Deschanel – Bones; Katherine Heigl – Grey's Anatomy; Jennifer Love Hewitt – Ghost Whisperer; Evangeline Lilly – Lost	**Hannah Montana**; Desperate Housewives; Entourage; The Office; Ugly Betty
Choice Comedy TV Actor	Choice Comedy TV Actress
**Steve Carell – The Office**; Adrian Grenier – Entourage; Neil Patrick Harris – How I Met Your Mother; Charlie Sheen – Two and a Half Men; David Spade – Rules of Engagement	**Miley Cyrus – Hannah Montana**; America Ferrera – Ugly Betty; Eva Longoria – Desperate Housewives; Tia Mowry – The Game; Emma Roberts – Unfabulous
Choice Reality TV Show	Choice Animated TV Show
**American Idol**; America's Next Top Model; Dancing with the Stars; The Hills; Pussycat Dolls Present	**The Simpsons**; Aqua Teen Hunger Force; Family Guy; Lil' Bush; South Park
Choice TV Villain	Choice Breakout TV Star
**Vanessa Williams – Ugly Betty**; Michael Emerson – Lost; Robert Knepper – Prison Break; Zachary Quinto – Heroes; Michael Rosenbaum – Smallville	**America Ferrera – Ugly Betty**; Matt Dallas – Kyle XY; Taylor Kitsch – Friday Night Lights; Masi Oka – Heroes; Hayden Panettiere – Heroes
Choice Breakout TV Show	Choice Reality TV Star: Male
**Heroes**; Friday Night Lights; October Road; South of Nowhere; Ugly Betty	**Sanjaya Malakar – American Idol**; Flavor Flav – Flavor of Love; Apolo Ohno – Dancing with the Stars; The Simmons Brothers – Run's House; The Three 6 Mafia – Adventures in Hollyhood
Choice Reality TV Star: Female	Choice TV Sidekick
**Lauren Conrad – The Hills**; Jaslene Gonzalez – America's Next Top Model; Paris Hilton – The Simple Life; Tiffany Pollard – I Love New York; Jordin Sparks – American Idol	**Allison Mack – Smallville**; Kevin Dillon – Entourage; Donald Faison – Scrubs; Jerry Ferrara – Entourage; Jorge Garcia – Lost
Choice TV Personality	Choice TV Movie
**Tyra Banks – America's Next Top Model & The Tyra Banks Show**; Nick Cannon – Wild 'n Out; Simon Cowell – American Idol; Ryan Seacrest – American Idol; Bruno Tonioli – Dancing with the Stars	**High School Musical 2**; The Initiation of Sarah; Jump In!; Life Is Not a Fairy Tale; The Naked Brothers Band: The Movie
Choice Summer TV Show
**Degrassi: The Next Generation**; America's Got Talent; Don't Forget the Lyrics!; The Singing Bee; So You Think You Can Dance

=== Music ===
Choice Male Artist	Choice Female Artist
**Justin Timberlake**; Bow Wow; John Mayer; Ne-Yo; Timbaland	**Fergie**; Nelly Furtado; Rihanna; Gwen Stefani; Carrie Underwood
Choice R&B Artist	Choice Rap Artist
**Rihanna**; Akon; Beyoncé; Chris Brown; Ne-Yo	**Timbaland**; Fabolous; Ludacris; T.I.; Young Jeezy
Choice Rock Group	Choice Single
**Fall Out Boy**; The All-American Rejects; Linkin Park; Maroon 5; Red Hot Chili Peppers	**"Girlfriend" – Avril Lavigne**; "Cupid's Chokehold" – Gym Class Heroes feat. Patrick Stump; "Give It to Me" – Timbaland feat. Nelly Furtado & Justin Timberlake; "The Sweet Escape" – Gwen Stefani feat. Akon; "Umbrella" – Rihanna feat. Jay-Z
Choice R&B Track	Choice Rap/Hip-Hop Track
**"Beautiful Girls" – Sean Kingston**; "Because of You" – Ne-Yo; "Get It Shawty" – Lloyd; "Last Night" – Diddy feat. Keyshia Cole; "Wall to Wall" – Chris Brown	**"The Way I Are" – Timbaland feat. Keri Hilson & D.O.E.**; "Buy U a Drank (Shawty Snappin')" – T-Pain feat. Yung Joc; "Party Like a Rockstar" – Shop Boyz; "Pop, Lock & Drop It" – Huey; "This Is Why I'm Hot" – Mims
Choice Payback Track	Choice Love Song
**"What Goes Around... Comes Around" – Justin Timberlake**; "Before He Cheats" – Carrie Underwood; "Irreplaceable" – Beyoncé; "Never Again" – Kelly Clarkson; "U + Ur Hand" – Pink	**"With Love" – Hilary Duff**; "Don't Matter" – Akon; "First Time" – Lifehouse; "Lost Without U" – Robin Thicke; "Stolen" – Dashboard Confessional
Choice Rock Track	Choice Male Breakout Artist
**"Thnks fr th Mmrs" – Fall Out Boy**; "Better Than Me" – Hinder; "It's Not Over" – Daughtry; "Makes Me Wonder" – Maroon 5; "What I've Done" – Linkin Park	**Akon**; Lloyd; Mika; Mims; Robin Thicke
Choice Female Breakout Artist	Choice Breakout Group
**Vanessa Hudgens**; Lily Allen; Corinne Bailey Rae; Katharine McPhee; Amy Winehouse	**Gym Class Heroes**; Daughtry; The Fray; Hinder; Shop Boyz
Choice Summer Music Star	Choice Summer Song
**Miley Cyrus**; Fergie; Avril Lavigne; Maroon 5; Rihanna	**"Hey There Delilah" – Plain White T's**; "Beautiful Girls" – Sean Kingston; "Lip Gloss" – Lil Mama; "Party Like a Rockstar" – Shop Boyz; "Shut Up and Drive" – Rihanna

=== Miscellaneous ===
Choice Male Hottie	Choice Female Hottie
**Zac Efron**; Orlando Bloom; Josh Duhamel; Taylor Kitsch; T.I.	**Jessica Alba**; Jessica Biel; Megan Fox; Hayden Panettiere; Rihanna
Choice Comedian	Choice Male Athlete
**Dane Cook**; Jack Black; Will Ferrell; David Spade; Katt Williams	**Tiger Woods**; LeBron James; Peyton Manning; Alex Rodriguez; Dwyane Wade
Choice Female Athlete	Choice Male Action Sports Athlete
**Maria Sharapova**; Rags to Riches; Rutgers Women's Basketball Team; Annika Sörenstam; Serena Williams	**Shaun White**; Andy Irons; Ryan Nyquist; Ryan Sheckler; Kelly Slater
Choice Female Action Sports Athlete	Choice OMG! Moment
**Lisa Andersen**; Gretchen Bleiler; Dallas Friday; Kristi Leskinen; Hannah Teter	**Britney Spears shaving her head**; Larry Birkhead is Dannielynn's father; Paris Hilton goes to jail, gets out of jail, then goes to jail again; Lindsay Lohan goes to rehab, gets out of rehab, then goes to rehab again; Sanjaya Malakar sports a faux-hawk on American Idol
Choice V-Cast Video
**The Hills**; Criss Angel Mindfreak; Ford Models; Mind of Mencia; Prom Queen
