= 2007 MTV Video Music Awards =

Award ceremony

- Date: Sunday, September 9, 2007
- Location: The Palms, Las Vegas, Nevada
- Country: United States
- Hosted by: none
- Most awards: Justin Timberlake (4)
- Most nominations: Justin Timberlake and Beyoncé (7 each)
- Website: http://www.mtv.com/ontv/vma/past-vmas/2007/

Television/radio coverage
- Network: MTV
- Produced by: Den of Thieves
- Directed by: Hamish Hamilton

The 2007 MTV Video Music Awards, honoring the best music videos from the previous year between June 2006 to June 2007, took place on September 9, in Las Vegas at The Palms. The 2007 VMAs were the smallest VMAs to ever take place, eliminating 13 awards, and renaming many of the remaining awards. The 2008 awards restored most of the categories.

== Overview ==
On August 7, 2007, the nominees were announced live on TRL with a special performance by Kanye West. The week before the ceremony, the network aired VMA Week on TRL, along with VMA-related programming, including performances from top artists.

The VMAs aired live on September 9, 2007 at 9:00 p.m. ET on MTV. Unlike in past years where the show was shown on MTV in 16:9 HDTV letterboxed format, this year the ceremony was aired in standard definition. However, it was still produced in high definition, and was scheduled to air in full on MHD (the current MTV Live), Viacom's high definition channel, on September 22. At the last moment, a "best of" 90 minute clip show was substituted, and MTV announced that the show in its entirety would not be re-aired in any form.

The 2007 VMAs were the first produced by Den of Thieves, a new company co-founded by former MTV producer Jesse Ignjatovic. They were produced on a smaller budget and in front of a smaller crowd. The venue at the Palms was criticized for its small stage. Only four performances took place on the main stage, which consisted of a small layered stage that led off to a number of "island" stages that served as guests' tables. Other performances occurred in other locations in the Palms, including guest suites. Kanye West was especially critical of this setup, claiming that he would "never return to MTV" after he was slotted to perform in the Hugh Hefner Sky Villa instead of the main stage.

== Performances ==
Unlike previous editions of the MTV Video Music Awards, the 2007 awards featured performances in different suites, each with its own host band and guests performing. The Main Show performances occurred at the same location where the awards were being televised.

Amy Winehouse's record label canceled her performance for the show following Lily Allen's withdrawal from the event due to issues obtaining a visa. The two were rumored to perform a duet. The French electronic group Justice was going to perform at the show with Mark Ronson during one of his VMA spots with an additional special guest. The group had to drop out due to their flight's late arrival in Las Vegas.

=== Pre-show ===
- Nicole Scherzinger featuring Lil Wayne – "Whatever U Like" (MTV-mix)

=== Main Show ===
- Britney Spears – "Trouble" intro/"Gimme More"
- Chris Brown featuring Rihanna – "Wall to Wall" / "Umbrella" (Rihanna intermission)/ "Billie Jean" / "Kiss Kiss" medley
- Linkin Park – "Bleed It Out" (surprise performance at Rain Night club) with intro by Timbaland
- Alicia Keys – "No One"/"Freedom" medley
- Closing Medley by Timbaland and guests: Nelly Furtado – "Do It" / D.O.E. and Sebastian – "The Way I Are" rap interlude / Timbaland featuring Keri Hilson – "The Way I Are" / Justin Timberlake – "LoveStoned" / Timbaland featuring Nelly Furtado and Justin Timberlake – "Give It to Me"

=== Small Mark Ronson Band Performances at the Main Show ===
- Mark Ronson featuring Akon – "Smack That"
- Mark Ronson featuring Adam Levine – "Wake Up Call"
- Mark Ronson featuring Wale – "W.A.L.E.D.A.N.C.E."
- Mark Ronson featuring Daniel Merriweather – "Stop Me"

=== Timbaland & Timberlake Fantasy Suite show ===
- Justin Timberlake featuring Timbaland - "Chop Me Up"
- T.I. – "Big Things Poppin' (Do It)"
- Petey Pablo – "Freak-a-Leek"
- 50 Cent featuring Justin Timberlake and Timbaland – "Ayo Technology"
- 50 Cent – "I Get Money"
- 50 Cent – "Straight To The Bank"/"In Da Club"

=== Fall Out Boy Fantasy Suite show ===
- Fall Out Boy – "Sugar, We're Goin Down"
- Rihanna featuring Fall Out Boy – "Shut Up and Drive"
- Fall Out Boy – "Thnks fr th Mmrs"
- Fall Out Boy – "Beat It"/"The Carpal Tunnel of Love" medley
- Fall Out Boy – "Don't Matter"
- Fall Out Boy – "Top Gun Anthem"
- Fall Out Boy featuring Lil Wayne, Tyga, Brendon Urie and Travie McCoy – "This Ain't a Scene, It's an Arms Race"
- Gym Class Heroes featuring Ne-Yo and Patrick Stump – "Clothes Off!!"
- Gym Class Heroes – "The Queen And I"
- Cobra Starship featuring William Beckett and Travie McCoy – "Bring It (Snakes on a Plane)"
- Cobra Starship – "The Church of Hot Addiction"

=== Kanye West Fantasy Suite show ===
- Kanye West – "Touch The Sky"
- Kanye West – "Champion"
- Soulja Boy – "Crank That"
- Kanye West – "Can't Tell Me Nothing"
- Kanye West – "I Wonder"
- Kanye West – "Stronger"
- Kanye West featuring T-Pain – "Good Life"
- Kanye West featuring Jamie Foxx – "Gold Digger"

=== Foo Fighters Fantasy Suite show ===
- Foo Fighters – "Shake Your Blood Part 1"
- Foo Fighters – "Everlong"
- Foo Fighters – "Best of You"
- Foo Fighters – "All My Life"
- Foo Fighters featuring Pat Smear – "The Pretender"
- Foo Fighters featuring Serj Tankian – "Holiday in Cambodia"
- Foo Fighters featuring Cee-Lo – "Darling Nikki"
- Queens of the Stone Age featuring Cee-Lo and Dave Grohl – "Make It wit Chu"
- Mastodon featuring Josh Homme – "Colony of Birchmen"
- Foo Fighters featuring Lemmy – "I'll Be Your Sister"
- Foo Fighters featuring Lemmy – "Shake Your Blood Part 2"
- Eagles of Death Metal featuring Dave Grohl – "Speaking in Tongues"
- Eagles of Death Metal featuring Dave Grohl – "I Want You So Hard"

== Appearances ==
- Sarah Silverman – performed a short comic monologue
- Alicia Keys – introduced Mark Ronson, the Fantasy Suites, and Nicole Scherzinger and Eve
- Nicole Scherzinger and Eve – presented Monster Single of the Year
- Bill Hader and Seth Rogen – appeared in vignettes about voting procedures for Best New Artist
- Robin Thicke and Jennifer Hudson – presented Quadruple Threat of the Year
- 50 Cent and Kanye West – presented Most Earthshattering Collaboration
- Rosario Dawson – promoted the upcoming VMA Viewer's Choice remix broadcast and introduced Chris Brown
- Audrina Patridge, Whitney Port, and Lauren Conrad – presented Male Artist of the Year
- Shia LaBeouf – presented Female Artist of the Year
- Pamela Anderson – introduced Kanye West and T-Pain
- Megan Fox – introduced Timbaland
- Kevin Connolly and Adrian Grenier – presented Best Group
- Nelly – introduced Alicia Keys
- Jamie Foxx and Jennifer Garner – presented Best New Artist
- Caitlin Upton – promoted the upcoming VMA Viewer's Choice remix broadcast
- Mary J. Blige – introduced Dr. Dre
- Dr. Dre – presented Video of the Year
- Diddy, Yung Joc, and Jermaine Paul – introduced the closing performance

== Winners and nominees ==
Winners are in bold text.

Video of the Year	Male Artist of the Year
**Rihanna (featuring Jay-Z) – "Umbrella"**; Beyoncé – "Irreplaceable"; Justice – "D.A.N.C.E."; Justin Timberlake – "What Goes Around... Comes Around"; Kanye West – "Stronger"; Amy Winehouse – "Rehab"	**Justin Timberlake**; Akon; Robin Thicke; T.I.; Kanye West
Female Artist of the Year	Best Group
**Fergie**; Beyoncé; Nelly Furtado; Rihanna; Amy Winehouse	**Fall Out Boy**; Gym Class Heroes; Linkin Park; Maroon 5; The White Stripes
Best New Artist	Quadruple Threat of the Year
**Gym Class Heroes**; Lily Allen; Peter Bjorn and John; Carrie Underwood; Amy Winehouse	**Justin Timberlake**; Beyoncé; Bono; Jay-Z; Kanye West
Most Earthshattering Collaboration	Monster Single of the Year
**Beyoncé and Shakira – "Beautiful Liar"**; Akon (featuring Eminem) – "Smack That"; Gwen Stefani (featuring Akon) – "The Sweet Escape"; Justin Timberlake (featuring Timbaland) – "SexyBack"; U2 and Green Day – "The Saints Are Coming"	**Rihanna (featuring Jay-Z) – "Umbrella"**; Daughtry – "Home"; Fall Out Boy – "Thnks fr th Mmrs"; Avril Lavigne – "Girlfriend"; Lil Mama – "Lip Gloss (No Music)"; Mims – "This Is Why I'm Hot"; Plain White T's – "Hey There Delilah"; Shop Boyz – "Party Like a Rockstar"; T-Pain (featuring Yung Joc) – "Buy U a Drank (Shawty Snappin')"; Timbaland (featuring D.O.E., Keri Hilson and Sebastian) – "The Way I Are"
Best Director	Best Choreography in a Video
**Justin Timberlake – "What Goes Around... Comes Around" (Director: Samuel Bayer)**; Christina Aguilera – "Candyman" (Directors: Matthew Rolston and Christina Aguilera); Beyoncé and Shakira – "Beautiful Liar" (Director: Jake Nava); Linkin Park – "What I've Done" (Director: Joseph Hahn); Rihanna (featuring Jay-Z) – "Umbrella" (Director: Chris Applebaum); Kanye West – "Stronger" (Director: Hype Williams)	**Justin Timberlake (featuring T.I.) – "Let Me Talk to You/My Love" (Choreographer: Marty Kudelka)**; Beyoncé and Shakira – "Beautiful Liar" (Choreographer: Frank Gatson); Chris Brown – "Wall to Wall" (Choreographers: Rich & Tone and Flii Stylz); Ciara – "Like a Boy" (Choreographer: Jamaica Craft); Eve (featuring Swizz Beatz) – "Tambourine" (Choreographer: Tanisha Scott and Jamaica Craft)
Best Editing in a Video	
**Gnarls Barkley – "Smiley Faces" (Editor: Ken Mowe)**; Beyoncé and Shakira – "Beautiful Liar" (Editor: Jarrett Fijal); Linkin Park – "What I've Done" (Editor: Igor Kovalik); Justin Timberlake – "What Goes Around... Comes Around" (Editor: Holle Singer); Kanye West – "Stronger" (Editors: Peter Johnson and Corey Weisz)

== Artists with multiple wins and nominations ==
Artists who received multiple awards
Wins	Artist
4	Justin Timberlake
2	Jay-Z
2	Rihanna

Artists who received multiple nominations
Nominations	Artist
7	Beyoncé
7	Justin Timberlake
5	Kanye West
4	Rihanna
4	Shakira
3	Amy Winehouse
3	Linkin Park
2	Akon
2	Fall Out Boy
2	Gym Class Heroes

== Music Videos with multiple wins and nominations ==
Music Videos that received multiple awards
Wins	Artist	Music Video
2	Rihanna (featuring Jay-Z)	"Umbrella"

Music Videos that received multiple nominations
Nominations	Artist	Music Video
4	Beyoncé & Shakira	"Beautiful Liar"
3	Justin Timberlake	"What Goes Around... Comes Around"
3	Kanye West	"Stronger"
3	Rihanna (featuring Jay-Z)	"Umbrella"
2	Linkin Park	"What I've Done"

== MTV2 On The Rise Contest ==
Flowers for Dorian won the MTV2 On The Rise contest. The prize for winning was getting flown to New York City to film 5 live videos in front of a green screen. The 5 videos were on Comcast's On Demand and one of the videos premiered at the VMAs. Flowers for Dorian's video for the song Love Remains premiered at the VMAs.

== Britney Spears' performance ==
Britney Spears served as the opening act for the show, performing her new single "Gimme More". She appeared in a black, jewel encrusted bikini and black boots. She performed the opening lines of "Trouble" before segueing into "Gimme More". The performance was universally panned by critics. Jeff Leeds of The New York Times said that "no one was prepared for Sunday night's fiasco, in which a listless Ms. Spears teetered through her dance steps and mouthed only occasional words in a wan attempt to lip-synch her new single". Vinay Menon of the Toronto Star commented Spears "looked hopelessly dazed. She was wearing the expression of somebody who had been deposited at the Palms Casino Resort by a tornado, one that promptly twisted away, taking her clothing and sense of purpose. ... [She was] lumbering, in slow motion, as if somebody had poured cement into her streetwalker boots". David Willis of BBC stated her performance would "go down in the history books as being one of the worst to grace the MTV Awards".

Immediately following Spears' performance, comedian Sarah Silverman presented a monologue that included numerous derogatory jokes about Spears, her career, and her children. Silverman joked that Spears, "at 25, had already accomplished in her life everything she ever will," and called her sons "most adorable mistakes you will ever see." Silverman's monologue received criticism for its harshness towards Spears and her children; Silverman responded to backlash by saying "it never occurred to me that would be deemed hurtful or over the line." Silverman's monologue garnered renewed criticism in 2021, following the release of the documentary Framing Britney Spears; Silverman expressed regret for her monologue, saying that MTV had hired her to perform a "mini-roast" of Spears, and that Silverman had not seen Spears' performance before going on stage.

The day after the performance, American vlogger Cara Cunningham, using the name Chris Crocker, posted a video to YouTube titled "Leave Britney alone!", in which she cried and defended Spears's performance, explaining that she did not want Spears to spiral out of control like Anna Nicole Smith, who had died in February 2007. Within the first 24 hours of its posting, the video accumulated over 2 million views. "Leave Britney alone!" turned Cunningham into an internet celebrity, and was featured on television shows such as The View and The Tonight Show with Jay Leno. It was also parodied by dozens of other YouTube users, most famously by actor Seth Green. An editor for YouTube said "the melodramatic two-minute clip made [Cunningham] an instant YouTube star" and named it one of the top videos of 2007. Wired named it the top video of 2007.

== Kid Rock/Tommy Lee altercation ==
Kid Rock and Tommy Lee were involved in an altercation at the Video Music Awards during the come-back performance of Alicia Keys. A source reported that Tommy Lee was sitting with magician Criss Angel when the two went to visit Diddy, who was sitting close to Kid Rock. Shortly after the two went over to see Diddy, "all hell broke loose", that source told Access Hollywood. It is reported that Kid Rock sucker-punched Tommy Lee in his back. The two, both ex-husbands of Pamela Anderson were broken up, and both were escorted from the resort. Angel was removed a short time later. The cause of the fight is unknown.

An eyewitness reported to TMZ that "Tommy got it pretty bad." The incident was confirmed by Palms Hotel and Casino public relations representative Larry Fink. MTV Host Sway Calloway said "Tommy Lee was sitting by P-Diddy and Kid Rock just got off stage and from what I saw he walked up to Lee and just decked him."

On-air reactions

- Presenter Jamie Foxx said "Let's stop all of this white-on-white crime."
- Diddy made a remark that "It's not just the hip-hop artists that sometimes have a problem."

== Non-music entertainment ==
Caitlin Upton, Miss South Carolina Teen USA 2007 – famous for her incoherent response to why she thought 1/5 of Americans can't locate the US on a world map, performed a parody of her response when she was presenting.

Shia LaBeouf revealed the name of the fourth Indiana Jones film: Indiana Jones and the Kingdom of the Crystal Skull. It was confirmed by the official site.

== See also ==
- Los Premios MTV Latinoamérica 2007
- 2007 MTV Europe Music Awards
- 2007 MTV Video Music Brasil
