= MTV Video Music Award for Monster Single of the Year =

Annual music video award

The Monster Single of the Year award was first introduced to the MTV Music Video Awards in 2007, as they were revamped that year and a few new awards were introduced. When the VMAs returned to their old format in 2008, though, this award was not brought back. However the concept of the award returned as Song of the Year 11 years after it was originally presented.

Year	Winner	Nominees	Ref.
2007	Rihanna (featuring Jay-Z) – "Umbrella"	Daughtry – "Home"; Fall Out Boy – "Thnks fr th Mmrs"; Avril Lavigne – "Girlfriend"; Lil' Mama – "Lip Gloss (No Music)"; MIMS – "This Is Why I'm Hot"; Plain White T's – "Hey There Delilah"; Shop Boyz – "Party Like a Rockstar"; T-Pain (featuring Yung Joc) – "Buy U a Drank (Shawty Snappin')"; Timbaland (featuring Keri Hilson, D.O.E. and Sebastian) – "The Way I Are"	
