= Teen Choice Award for Choice Music – Collaboration =

Entertainment award category

The following is a list of Teen Choice Award winners and nominees for Choice Music - Collaboration. It was first introduced as Choice Music - Hook Up from 2002-2004 before being awarded under its current title in 2005. It was later given out under its original title from 2008-2010 before being retitled again in 2015.

== Winners and nominees ==
=== 2000s ===
| Year | Winner | Nominees | Ref. |
|---|---|---|---|
| 2002 | "Girlfriend" – *NSYNC featuring Nelly | "Ain't It Funny" – Jennifer Lopez featuring Ja Rule; "Always on Time" – Ja Rule featuring Ashanti; "Gangsta Lovin'" – Eve featuring Alicia Keys; "I Need a Girl (Part One)" - P. Diddy featuring Usher and Loon; "Pass the Courvoisier, Part II" – Busta Rhymes featuring P. Diddy and Pharrell; "Rainy Dayz" – Mary J. Blige featuring Ja Rule; "What's Luv?" – Fat Joe featuring Ashanti | |
| 2003 | "21 Questions" – 50 Cent featuring Nate Dogg | "'03 Bonnie & Clyde" – Jay Z featuring Beyoncé; "All I Have" – Jennifer Lopez featuring LL Cool J; "Cry Me a River" – Justin Timberlake featuring Timbaland; "Dilemma" – Nelly featuring Kelly Rowland; "Dirrty" – Christina Aguilera featuring Redman; "The Game of Love" – Santana featuring Michelle Branch; "Picture" – Kid Rock featuring Sheryl Crow | |
| 2004 | "Yeah!" – Usher featuring Lil Jon and Ludacris | "Baby Boy" – Beyoncé featuring Sean Paul; "Frontin'" – Pharrell featuring Jay Z; "I Don't Wanna Know" – Mario Winans featuring Enya and P. Diddy; "Me Against the Music" – Britney Spears featuring Madonna; "Shake Ya Tailfeather" – Nelly, Diddy and Murphy Lee; "The Way You Move" – OutKast featuring Sleepy Brown; "Where Is the Love?" – The Black Eyed Peas featuring Justin Timberlake | |
| 2005 | "Rich Girl" – Gwen Stefani featuring Eve | "1, 2 Step" – Ciara featuring Missy Elliott; "Drop It Like It's Hot" – Snoop Dogg featuring Pharrell; "How We Do" – The Game featuring 50 Cent; "MJB da MVP" – Mary J. Blige featuring The Game and 50 Cent; "Numb/Encore" – Linkin Park and Jay Z; "Over and Over" – Nelly featuring Tim McGraw; "Signs" – Snoop Dogg featuring Charlie Wilson and Justin Timberlake | |
| 2008 | "No Air" – Jordin Sparks and Chris Brown | "4 Minutes" – Madonna featuring Justin Timberlake; "Low" – Flo Rida featuring T-Pain; "Party People" – Nelly featuring Fergie; "Shawty Get Loose" – Lil Mama featuring Chris Brown and T-Pain | |
| 2009 | "Just Dance" – Lady Gaga featuring Colby O'Donis | "Kiss Me thru the Phone" – Soulja Boy featuring Sammie; "Live Your Life" – T.I. featuring Rihanna; "Love Sex Magic" – Ciara featuring Justin Timberlake; "Lucky" – Jason Mraz and Colbie Caillat | |

=== 2010s ===
| Year | Winner | Nominees | Ref. |
|---|---|---|---|
| 2010 | "Airplanes" – B.o.B featuring Hayley Williams | "I Like It" – Enrique Iglesias featuring Pitbull; "If We Ever Meet Again" – Timbaland featuring Katy Perry; "Telephone" – Lady Gaga featuring Beyoncé; "We'll Be a Dream" – We the Kings featuring Demi Lovato | |
| 2015 | "Bad Blood" – Taylor Swift featuring Kendrick Lamar | "Hey Mama" – David Guetta featuring Nicki Minaj, Bebe Rexha and Afrojack; "Pretty Girls" – Britney Spears and Iggy Azalea; "See You Again" – Wiz Khalifa featuring Charlie Puth; "Uptown Funk" – Mark Ronson featuring Bruno Mars; "Where Are Ü Now" – Jack Ü and Justin Bieber | |
| 2017 | "Just Hold On" – Steve Aoki and Louis Tomlinson | "God, Your Mama, and Me" – Florida Georgia Line featuring Backstreet Boys; "I Don't Wanna Live Forever" – Zayn and Taylor Swift; "It Ain't Me" – Kygo and Selena Gomez; "No Promises" – Cheat Codes featuring Demi Lovato; "Stay" – Zedd and Alessia Cara | |
| 2018 | "Rewrite the Stars" – Zendaya and Zac Efron | "Meant to Be" – Bebe Rexha featuring Florida Georgia Line; "Finesse Remix" – Bruno Mars featuring Cardi B; "End Game" – Taylor Swift featuring Ed Sheeran and Future; "Pray for Me" – The Weeknd and Kendrick Lamar; "The Middle" – Zedd, Maren Morris and Grey | |
| 2019 | "Boy with Luv" – BTS featuring Halsey | "Dancing with a Stranger" – Sam Smith and Normani; "I Don't Care" – Ed Sheeran and Justin Bieber; "Old Town Road (Remix)" – Lil Nas X featuring Billy Ray Cyrus; "Shallow" – Lady Gaga and Bradley Cooper; "What a Time" – Julia Michaels featuring Niall Horan | |
