= 2008 Teen Choice Awards =

Edition of American award show

- Date: August 4, 2008
- Location: Gibson Amphitheatre, Universal City, California
- Hosted by: Miley Cyrus

Television/radio coverage
- Network: Fox

The 2008 Teen Choice Awards ceremony was held on August 4, 2008, at the Gibson Amphitheatre, Universal City, California. The event was hosted by Miley Cyrus, who also performed.

== Performers ==
- Miley Cyrus – "7 Things"
- Mariah Carey – "I'll Be Lovin' U Long Time"

== Presenters ==
- James Marsden and Danica Patrick — presented Choice Summer Movie: Action
- Demi Lovato and Josh Duhamel — presented Choice TV Show: Drama
- Rainn Wilson — introduced Ask the Jonas Brothers
- Sophia Bush and Drake Bell — presented Choice Comedian
- Luke Ford and Vanessa Hudgens — presented Choice TV: Female Breakout Star
- Katharine McPhee and Jesse McCartney — presented Choice MySpacer
- Chad Michael Murray and Leighton Meester — presented Choice Movie Actor: Drama
- Miranda Cosgrove, Selena Gomez and JoJo — introduced the cast of The Secret Life of the American Teenager
- Minka Kelly and Zac Efron — presented Choice Summer Movie: Comedy
- Randy Jackson — introduced Mariah Carey
- Rachel Bilson and Chace Crawford — presented Choice TV Actress: Action
- Brittany Snow — presented awards to the Jonas Brothers
- Scarlett Johansson — presented the Do Something Award
- LL Cool J and Natasha Bedingfield — presented Choice Music: Male Artist
- The Cheetah Girls — presented the nominees for Choice Female Red Carpet Fashion Icon
- Thomas Dekker, Summer Glau and Brian Austin Green — presented Choice TV: Female Reality/Variety Star
- Adam G. Sevani and Jon M. Chu — introduced M&M Cru
- Jerry O'Connell and Niecy Nash — introduced David Archuleta and David Cook
- David Archuleta and David Cook — presented Choice Music: Female Artist
- Lil Mama and Jordin Sparks — presented Choice Hotties: Male and Female
- Josh Holloway and Kristen Bell — presented Choice Male Athlete
- Fergie — announced the winner of the AC/DC and M&M Cru Dance-Off

== Winners and nominees ==
Winners are listed first and highlighted in bold text.

=== Movies ===
Choice Movie: Action	Choice Movie Actor: Action
**The Chronicles of Narnia: Prince Caspian**; The Forbidden Kingdom; Indiana Jones and the Kingdom of the Crystal Skull; Iron Man; Speed Racer	**Shia LaBeouf – Indiana Jones and the Kingdom of the Crystal Skull**; Jackie Chan – The Forbidden Kingdom; Robert Downey Jr. – Iron Man; Harrison Ford – Indiana Jones and the Kingdom of the Crystal Skull; Emile Hirsch – Speed Racer
Choice Movie Actress: Action	Choice Movie: Drama
**Rachel Bilson – Jumper**; Abigail Breslin – Nim's Island; Diane Kruger – National Treasure: Book of Secrets; Gwyneth Paltrow – Iron Man; Christina Ricci – Speed Racer	**Step Up 2: The Streets**; 21; August Rush; Into the Wild; Stop-Loss
Choice Movie Actor: Drama	Choice Movie Actress: Drama
**Channing Tatum – Stop-Loss**; Jake Gyllenhaal – Rendition; Emile Hirsch – Into the Wild; Ryan Phillippe – Stop-Loss; Mark Wahlberg – We Own the Night	**Keira Knightley – Atonement**; Kate Bosworth – 21; Scarlett Johansson – The Other Boleyn Girl; Keri Russell – August Rush; Reese Witherspoon – Rendition
Choice Movie: Chick Flick	Choice Movie: Romantic Comedy
**27 Dresses**; Enchanted; Fool's Gold; P.S. I Love You; Sex and the City	**What Happens in Vegas**; Dan in Real Life; Definitely, Maybe; Forgetting Sarah Marshall; Made of Honor
Choice Movie: Comedy	Choice Movie Actor: Comedy
**Juno**; Baby Mama; College Road Trip; Semi-Pro; Superbad	**Ashton Kutcher – What Happens in Vegas**; Michael Cera – Superbad and Juno; Will Ferrell – Semi-Pro; Jonah Hill – Superbad; James Marsden – 27 Dresses and Enchanted
Choice Movie Actress: Comedy	Choice Movie: Horror/Thriller
**Elliot Page (Note: Credited as Ellen Page; Juno was released before Page came out as transgender.) – Juno**; Amy Adams – Enchanted; Kristen Bell – Forgetting Sarah Marshall; Cameron Diaz – What Happens in Vegas; Sarah Jessica Parker – Sex and the City	**I Am Legend**; 30 Days of Night; Cloverfield; Prom Night; The Strangers
Choice Movie Actor: Horror/Thriller	Choice Movie Actress: Horror/Thriller
**Will Smith – I Am Legend**; Edward Burns – One Missed Call; Josh Hartnett – 30 Days of Night; Michael Stahl-David – Cloverfield; Scott Speedman – The Strangers	**Jessica Alba – The Eye**; Odette Annable – Cloverfield; Brittany Snow – Prom Night; Shannyn Sossamon – One Missed Call; Liv Tyler – The Strangers
Choice Movie: Villain	Choice Movie: Male Breakout Star
**Johnny Depp – Sweeney Todd: The Demon Barber of Fleet Street**; Cate Blanchett – Indiana Jones and the Kingdom of the Crystal Skull; Jeff Bridges – Iron Man; Samuel L. Jackson – Jumper; Susan Sarandon – Enchanted	**Drake Bell – Superhero Movie**; Ben Barnes – The Chronicles of Narnia: Prince Caspian; Michael Cera – Superbad and Juno; Jason Segel – Forgetting Sarah Marshall; Jim Sturgess – 21 and Across the Universe
Choice Movie: Female Breakout Star	Choice Summer Movie: Action
**Elliot Page – Juno**; Kristen Bell – Forgetting Sarah Marshall; Briana Evigan – Step Up 2: The Streets; Mila Kunis – Forgetting Sarah Marshall; Jurnee Smollett – The Great Debaters	**Hancock**; The Dark Knight; The Incredible Hulk; Journey to the Center of the Earth; Wanted
Choice Summer Movie: Comedy	
**Get Smart**; Kung Fu Panda; Meet Dave; WALL-E; You Don't Mess with the Zohan

=== Television ===
Choice TV Show: Drama	Choice TV Actor: Drama
**Gossip Girl**; Friday Night Lights; Grey's Anatomy; House; One Tree Hill	**Chad Michael Murray – One Tree Hill**; Penn Badgley – Gossip Girl; Chace Crawford – Gossip Girl; Patrick Dempsey – Grey's Anatomy; Taylor Kitsch – Friday Night Lights
Choice TV Actress: Drama	Choice TV Show: Action
**Blake Lively – Gossip Girl**; Hilarie Burton – One Tree Hill; Sophia Bush – One Tree Hill; Katherine Heigl – Grey's Anatomy; Leighton Meester – Gossip Girl	**Heroes**; Lost; Prison Break; Smallville; Terminator: The Sarah Connor Chronicles
Choice TV Actor: Action	Choice TV Actress: Action
**Milo Ventimiglia – Heroes**; Matthew Fox – Lost; Josh Holloway – Lost; Wentworth Miller – Prison Break; Tom Welling – Smallville	**Hayden Panettiere – Heroes**; Summer Glau – Terminator: The Sarah Connor Chronicles; Kristin Kreuk – Smallville; Ali Larter – Heroes; Evangeline Lilly – Lost
Choice TV Show: Comedy	Choice TV Actor: Comedy
**Hannah Montana**; Desperate Housewives; How I Met Your Mother; Two and a Half Men; Ugly Betty	**Steve Carell – The Office**; Neil Patrick Harris – How I Met Your Mother; Charlie Sheen – Two and a Half Men; Michael Urie – Ugly Betty; Barry Watson – Samantha Who?
Choice TV Actress: Comedy	Choice TV Show: Animated
**Miley Cyrus – Hannah Montana**; Christina Applegate – Samantha Who?; America Ferrera – Ugly Betty; Tina Fey – 30 Rock; Jaime Pressly – My Name Is Earl	**Family Guy**; American Dad!; Aqua Teen Hunger Force; The Simpsons; South Park
Choice TV Show: Reality Dance	Choice TV Show: Reality Music Competition
**America's Best Dance Crew**; Dance War: Bruno vs. Carrie Ann; Dancing with the Stars; So You Think You Can Dance; Your Mama Don't Dance	**American Idol**; Don't Forget the Lyrics!; Making the Band 4; The Next Great American Band; The Pussycat Dolls Present: Girlicious
Choice TV Show: Reality Beauty/Makeover	Choice TV Show: Celebrity Reality
**America's Next Top Model**; Beauty and the Geek; The Biggest Loser; Extreme Makeover: Home Edition; Project Runway	**The Hills**; Keeping Up with the Kardashians; Life of Ryan; Rob & Big; Run's House
Choice TV Show: Looking For Love	Choice TV Show: Reality Competition
**The Bachelor: London Calling**; The Bachelorette; Flavor of Love; I Love New York; Rock of Love with Bret Michaels	**Oprah's Big Give**; The Amazing Race; American Gladiator; Big Brother 9; Survivor: Micronesia
Choice TV: Game Show	Choice TV: Personality
**Deal or No Deal**; Amnesia; Are You Smarter than a 5th Grader?; Duel; The Moment of Truth	**Tyra Banks – America's Next Top Model**; Simon Cowell – American Idol; Heidi Klum – Project Runway; Lil Mama – America's Best Dance Crew; Ryan Seacrest – American Idol and E! News
Choice TV: Villain	Choice TV: Breakout Show
**Ed Westwick – Gossip Girl**; Spencer Pratt – The Hills; Zachary Quinto – Heroes; Michael Rosenbaum – Smallville; Vanessa Williams – Ugly Betty	**Gossip Girl**; America's Best Dance Crew; Miss Guided; Samantha Who?; Terminator: The Sarah Connor Chronicles
Choice TV: Male Breakout Star	Choice TV: Female Breakout Star
**Chace Crawford – Gossip Girl**; Thomas Dekker – Terminator: The Sarah Connor Chronicles; Jabbawockeez – America's Best Dance Crew; Zachary Levi – Chuck; Ed Westwick – Gossip Girl	**Blake Lively – Gossip Girl**; Summer Glau – Terminator: The Sarah Connor Chronicles; Leighton Meester – Gossip Girl; Taylor Momsen – Gossip Girl; Olivia Wilde – House
Choice TV: Male Reality/Variety Star	Choice TV: Female Reality/Variety Star
**David Cook – American Idol**; Christopher Boykin and Rob Dyrdek – Rob & Big; Jabbawockeez – America's Best Dance Crew; Brody Jenner – The Hills; Ryan Sheckler – Life of Ryan	**Lauren Conrad – The Hills**; Kim Kardashian – Keeping Up with the Kardashians; Heidi Montag – The Hills; Whitney Thompson – America's Next Top Model; Kristi Yamaguchi – Dancing with the Stars
Choice Summer TV Show	
**The Secret Life of the American Teenager**; America's Best Dance Crew; Degrassi: The Next Generation; High School Musical: Get in the Picture; So You Think You Can Dance

=== Music ===
Choice Music: Male Artist	Choice Music: Female Artist
**Chris Brown**; Jesse McCartney; Justin Timberlake; Usher; Kanye West	**Miley Cyrus**; Mariah Carey; Fergie; Rihanna; Britney Spears
Choice Music: R&B Artist	Choice Music: Rap Artist
**Chris Brown**; Beyoncé; Rihanna; T-Pain; Usher	**Lil Wayne**; Flo Rida; Lil Mama; Lupe Fiasco; Kanye West
Choice Music: Rock Group	Choice Music: Single
**Linkin Park**; Boys Like Girls; Fall Out Boy; Paramore; Simple Plan	**"When You Look Me in the Eyes" – Jonas Brothers**; "4 Minutes" – Madonna featuring Justin Timberlake; "Don't Stop the Music" – Rihanna; "See You Again" – Miley Cyrus; "With You" – Chris Brown
Choice Music: R&B Track	Choice Music: Rap/Hip-Hop Track
**"Forever" – Chris Brown**; "Bye Bye" – Mariah Carey; "Damaged" – Danity Kane; "Hey Baby (Jump Off)" – Bow Wow and Omarion; "Take You There" – Sean Kingston	**"Shawty Get Loose" – Lil Mama featuring Chris Brown and T-Pain**; "The Anthem" – Pitbull featuring Lil Jon; "Homecoming" – Kanye West featuring Chris Martin; "Party People" – Nelly featuring Fergie; "Superstar" – Lupe Fiasco featuring Matthew Santos
Choice Music: Rock Track	Choice Music: Love Song
**"crushcrushcrush" – Paramore**; "The Great Escape" – Boys Like Girls; "Nine in the Afternoon" – Panic! at the Disco; "Shadow of the Day" – Linkin Park; "Stop and Stare" – OneRepublic	**"When You Look Me in the Eyes" – Jonas Brothers**; "Bleeding Love" – Leona Lewis; "Bubbly" – Colbie Caillat; "No Air" – Chris Brown and Jordin Sparks; "No One" – Alicia Keys
Choice Music: Breakout Artist	Choice Music: Breakout Group
**Taylor Swift**; Colbie Caillat; Flo Rida; Leona Lewis; Jordin Sparks	**Jonas Brothers**; Day 26; Girlicious; OneRepublic; Paramore
Choice Music: Hook Up	Choice Summer Song
**"No Air" – Jordin Sparks and Chris Brown**; "4 Minutes" – Madonna featuring Justin Timberlake; "Low" – Flo Rida featuring T-Pain; "Party People" – Nelly featuring Fergie; "Shawty Get Loose" – Lil Mama featuring Chris Brown and T-Pain	**"Burnin' Up" – Jonas Brothers**; "7 Things" – Miley Cyrus; "Forever" – Chris Brown; "I Kissed a Girl" – Katy Perry; "Leavin'" – Jesse McCartney

=== Fashion ===
Choice Male Hottie	Choice Female Hottie
**Jonas Brothers**; Chris Brown; Chace Crawford; Zac Efron; Taylor Kitsch	**Vanessa Hudgens**; Megan Fox; Blake Lively; Hayden Panettiere; Rihanna
Choice Male Red Carpet Fashion Icon	Choice Female Red Carpet Fashion Icon
**Jonas Brothers**; Chris Brown; Zac Efron; Shia LaBeouf; Pete Wentz	**Carrie Underwood**; Jessica Biel; Lauren Conrad; Kate Hudson; Hayden Panettiere

=== Miscellaneous ===
Choice Male Athlete	Choice Female Athlete
**David Beckham**; Kobe Bryant; LeBron James; Eli Manning; Tiger Woods	**Shawn Johnson**; Candace Parker; Danica Patrick; Maria Sharapova; Serena Williams
Choice Male Action Sports Star	Choice Female Action Sports Star
**Ryan Sheckler**; Mick Fanning; Ryan Nyquist; Kelly Slater; Shaun White	**Stephanie Gilmore**; Gretchen Bleiler; Dallas Friday; Kristi Leskinen; Hannah Teter
Choice Comedian	Do Something Award
**Adam Sandler**; Michael Cera; Dane Cook; Will Ferrell; Jonah Hill	**Chad Bullock**
Choice Fanatic Fans	Choice MySpacer
**David Archuleta**; Miley Cyrus; Jonas Brothers; Jesse McCartney; Britney Spears	**Ryan Sheckler**; Robert Downey Jr.; Katy Perry; Jaime Pressly; Channing Tatum
