= R. Malcolm Jones =

American motion picture director, cinematographer, and television writer

R. Malcolm Jones is an American film director, cinematographer, and television writer. He is a graduate of the University of Miami, where he was awarded the prestigious Eastman Kodak Scholarship—becoming the youngest recipient in the program’s history—and also received a university Merit Scholarship.

Jones began his career directing music videos for major recording artists. He earned a nomination for Video Director of the Year at the BET Awards, and his video for "Right Round" by Flo Rida featuring Kesha was nominated for Best Hip-Hop Video at the MTV Video Music Awards.

His music-video credits include collaborations with Flo Rida, Avril Lavigne, Swizz Beatz, T-Pain, Chris Brown, Lil Mama, Mario, Vanessa Hudgens, Nas, Clipse, and Fat Joe. Jones has also directed commercial campaigns for HBO, BET, and CMT—including work with the Dallas Cowboys Cheerleaders.

Jones made his feature directorial debut with Secrets of the Magic City, starring Jenifer Lewis, Jamie Hector, and Keith David. The film screened at several international festivals, including the American Black Film Festival, Urbanworld Film Festival, Champs-Élysées Film Festival, Pan African Film Festival, and BronzeLens Film Festival. It garnered multiple awards, such as BronzeLens’ Best Actress and Best Actor honors and PAFF’s Capital Partners Award. The film later premiered on BET and was distributed by EOne Entertainment.

In television, Jones served as a writer on the animated series Young Love, based on Matthew A. Cherry’s Academy Award–winning short film Hair Love. The series premiered on HBO Max.

Jones recently directed the feature film Fabricated, starring Novi Brown, Kearia Schroeder, Lil Mama, Travis Cure, and MC Lyte.

== Education ==
University of Miami, Bachelor of Science in Communications, Miami, Florida Double Major Film and English (Creative Writing) Kermit & Mickey Schafer Scholarship winner for outstanding academics George Washington University

== Awards ==
- Bronze Lens Film Festival, Secrets of the Magic City, Best Actor and Actress Winner
- CAPRI Capital Partners Winner, 22nd Annual Pan African Film Festival
- BET Awards, Video Director of the Year Nominee
- MTV Video Music Awards, Best Hip Hop Video - Nominee

== Music videos ==
- GDFR" – Flo Rida featuring Sage the Gemini
- Brown Sugar" – Ray J featuring Lil Wayne
- Accessory" – Jordyn Taylor
- Right Round" – Flo Rida
- Shawty Get Loose" – Lil Mama featuring Chris Brown and T-Pain
- Sneakernight" – Vanessa Hudgens
- Cryin' Out for Me" – Mario
- Drink N My 2 Step" – Cassidy featuring Swizz Beatz
- Lip Gloss" – Lil Mama
- Hustlers" – Nas featuring The Game
- G-Slide" – Lil Mama
- Girlfriend (Remix)" – Avril Lavigne featuring Lil Mama
- Sexy Can I" – Ray J featuring Yung Berg
- "Make It Rain" – Fat Joe featuring T.I., Lil Wayne, DJ Khaled, and Rick Ross
- L.I.F.E." – Lil Mama
- Mr. Me Too" – Clipse
- So Much More" – Fat Joe
- What It Is (Strike a Pose)" – Lil Mama featuring T-Pain
- Vans" – The Pack
- Wamp Wamp (What It Do)" – Clipse
- All Your Love" – K'La
