= Players Ball (disambiguation) =

The Players Ball began in 1974 as an annual meeting of pimps in Chicago.

Players Ball may also refer to:

- "Player's Ball", the 1994 debut single by Outkast
- Playas Ball, a 2003 film written and directed by Jennifer Harper
