= When Love Kills: The Falicia Blakely Story =

Biographical film by Tasha Smith

- Written by: Cas Sigers-Beedles
- Directed by: Tasha Smith
- Starring: Lil Mama; Lance Gross; Tami Roman
- Country of origin: United States
- Original language: English

Production
- Producers: Tasha Smith; Cas Sigers-Beedles; James Seppelfrick; James Seppelfrick; David Eubanks
- Cinematography: Bruce Francis Cole
- Editor: Dante Wyatt
- Running time: 95 minutes
- Production company: Swirl Films

Original release
- Network: TV One
- Release: August 28, 2017

When Love Kills: The Falicia Blakely Story is a 2017 American biographical crime drama film based on a true story directed by Tasha Smith in her directorial debut, and written by Cas Sigers-Beedles. The film stars Lil Mama as Falicia Blakely, a 16-year-old teen mom who becomes a stripper, and pimp and predator, Dino (played by Lance Gross). On August 15, 2002, Blakely and Dino robbed and killed two men, Claudell Christmas and Raymond Goodwin, and the next day killed Lemetrius Twitty, after picking him up at a club. The duo were arrested after a week-long run and eventually pleaded guilty to multiple charges. Blakely is serving three life sentences without parole in a Georgia prison. Blakely is the first and youngest woman to ever be considered for the death penalty in Georgia.

It premiered at the 2017 American Black Film Festival on June 15, 2017. It later premiered on TV One on August 28, 2017. The film received positive reviews from critics and two nominations at the 49th NAACP Image Awards.

== Cast ==
- Lil Mama as Falicia Blakely
- Lance Gross as Dino
- Tami Roman as Stacey Blakely
- Tiffany Black as Pumpkin
- Walter Fauntleroy as Q
- LeShai Renee Hunt as Rashelle
- Karon Riley as Robert
- Don Wallace as Khalil
- Robert Crayton as Blue
- Christian Robinson as Vinny
- Kendrick Cross as Raymond
- Floyd Mayweather Jr. as Punch
- KaMillion as Meesha
- Big Freedia as Tam
- Chasnie Houston as Shawnee

== Reception ==
The film received positive reviews for performances of Lil Mama, Gross, and Roman and Smith' directing. The film became the highest-rated original movie in the history of the TV One, according to the network. At the 49th NAACP Image Awards, When Love Kills: The Falicia Blakely Story was nominated for an Outstanding Television Movie, Limited-Series or Dramatic Special, and Outstanding Writing in a Television Movie or Special (Cas Sigers-Beedles).
