= Lip Gloss =

Single by Lil Mama

from the album VYP (Voice of the Young People)
- B-side: "Girlfriend"
- Released: June 19, 2007
- Genre: Hip-hop
- Length: 3:24 (Radio Edit) 3:39 (Single Mix) 4:04 (Album Version)
- Label: Jive
- Songwriters: James "Groove" Chambers; Niatia Kirkland
- Producer: James "Groove" Chambers

Lil Mama singles chronology
"Lip Gloss" (2007)	"G-Slide (Tour Bus)" (2007)

Music video
- "Lip Gloss" on YouTube

"Lip Gloss" is the debut single by American rapper Lil Mama. It was released June 19, 2007, as the lead single from her debut album, VYP: Voice of the Young People. "Lip Gloss" is a percussive hip-hop song.

For the weekend ending on June 9, the song debuted on the U.S. Billboard Hot 100 at number 95. The next week it fell off, though after its release to iTunes, it re-entered the chart at number twelve for the week ending on June 23, eventually peaking at number 10.

The song was certified gold by the RIAA on February 13, 2008.

== Music video ==
The music video, directed by R. Malcolm Jones, shows Lil Mama dancing, stomping and clapping, and rapping at a high school. In the video, before the third verse of the song, the video switches to "No Music", which features appearances by Kanye West and Slim Thug. The verse from "No Music" was also featured on the album version of "Lip Gloss".

The video was nominated for Monster Single of the Year at the 2007 MTV Video Music Awards.

== Track listing ==
12" promo

1. "Lip Gloss" (main version)
2. "Lip Gloss" (instrumental)
3. "Lip Gloss" (a cappella)

CD single

1. "Lip Gloss" (album version)
2. "Lip Gloss" (Full Phat Remix)
3. "Lip Gloss" (Safe Mode Lec Trow Remix)
4. "Girlfriend" (Dr. Luke Mix) (featuring Avril Lavigne)

Digital download

1. "Lip Gloss"

== Chart performance ==
Chart (2007–2008)	Peak position
US Billboard Hot 100	10
US Hot R&B/Hip-Hop Songs (Billboard)	36
US Pop 100 (Billboard)	15

== Certifications ==
Region	Certification	Certified units/sales
New Zealand (RMNZ)	Gold	15,000^{‡}
United States (RIAA)	Gold	500,000^{^}
United States (RIAA) Mastertone	Gold	500,000^{^}
^{^} Shipments figures based on certification alone.^{‡} Sales+streaming figures based on certification alone.

== In popular culture ==
There is a dance called "The Lip Gloss" that accompanies the song. This song was number 56 on Rolling Stone's list of the 100 Best Songs of 2007. Pitchfork named "Lip Gloss" the 27th best song of 2007.

Fellow American rapper Nicki Minaj sampled and interpolated "Lip Gloss" on a song titled "Wuchoo Know", from her debut 2007 mixtape Playtime Is Over. American mashup artist Girl Talk also sampled the song on his track "Like This", from his 2008 album Feed the Animals. This song was featured primarily as the backing track for the Prada Spring/Summer 2010 women's wear fashion show.
