= Addicted (2014 film) =

- Theatrical release poster
- Directed by: Bille Woodruff
- Screenplay by: Christina Welsh; Ernie Barbarash
- Based on: Addicted by Zane
- Produced by: Paul Hall
- Starring: Sharon Leal; Boris Kodjoe; Tasha Smith; Tyson Beckford; Emayatzy Corinealdi; William Levy
- Cinematography: Joseph White
- Edited by: Bruce Cannon
- Music by: Aaron Zigman
- Production company: Codeblack Films
- Distributed by: Lionsgate
- Release date: October 10, 2014 (United States)
- Running time: 105 minutes
- Country: United States
- Language: English
- Budget: $5 million
- Box office: $17.5 million

Addicted is a 2014 American drama film directed by Bille Woodruff from a screenplay by Christina Welsh and Ernie Barbarash, based on Zane's novel of the same name. It stars Sharon Leal, Boris Kodjoe, Tasha Smith, Tyson Beckford, Emayatzy Corinealdi, and William Levy. The film was released in the United States on October 10, 2014, by Lionsgate. It received generally negative reviews from critics.

== Plot ==
Zoe Reynard has the perfect life with her husband Jason and two children, and is the CEO of her own company, which signs and develops aspiring artists. One evening, she attends an art show of Quinton Canosa; the two meet and share some flirtation. Zoe later visits his apartment to discuss a contract, and the two end up having sex.

Zoe feels guilty and tries to end it with Quinton; they break up regularly, but always inevitably end up getting back together. On one particular occasion, when Zoe goes to get back with Quinton, she finds him having sex with his neighbor.

Throughout the film, Zoe is telling this story as a flashback to her psychotherapist, Dr. Marcella Spencer, who after diagnosing her with sex addiction, assumes it might have been something from Zoe's past that keeps coming back to haunt her and pressures her to confess. However, each time brought up, Zoe avoids the question and walks out.

Zoe's addiction begins to take over her life; she soon begins sleeping with a second man, Corey, whom she met at a club. One day, when she comes home from work, she finds Corey at her home talking to her mother. Seeing the danger she had put her family in, Zoe decides that she wants to try to fix her marriage with Jason. She invites both Corey and Quinton to meet her at Quinton's apartment and breaks up with both of them.

Corey becomes angry and lunges at her, but Quinton blocks him. As Corey leaves, Quinton knocks him out with a vase. Zoe becomes afraid of Quinton and tries to calm him down; Quinton tells her that she is not going to leave him. Frightened, Zoe shoves glass artwork between them, smashing it to pieces. She then hides from Quinton, who is chasing her with a knife. Suddenly, Jason appears and smashes a sculpture over Quinton's head. Jason reveals he found out about Zoe cheating by her cellphone.

Zoe runs after Jason, apologizing profusely, but he rejects her. Out of desperation, Zoe walks in front of a car, injuring herself. The two split up and Jason stays in a hotel. Zoe becomes a recluse but soon goes to a sex-addiction group therapy session. The root of Zoe's addiction was found to be because of a rape committed by three boys when she was 10 years old. At the session, she speaks of her deep love for her husband, and Jason walks in, kisses her, and accepts her back.

== Cast ==
- Sharon Leal as Zoe Reynard, owner of Zoe & Co., an artist-marketing agency
- Boris Kodjoe as Jason Reynard, Zoe's husband and an architect
- William Levy as Quinton Canosa, an artist who becomes Zoe's lover
- Brandon Gonzales as Tony
- Tyson Beckford as Corey, one of Zoe's lovers
- Kat Graham as Diamond, Quinton's other lover
- Tasha Smith as Dr. Marcella Spencer, a psychotherapist specializing in sexual addiction
- Maria Howell as Nina, Zoe's mother
- Garrett Hines as Benny
- Emayatzy Corinealdi as Brina, Zoe's assistant and best friend
- Hunter Burke as Shane
- Cameron Mills as 10 year old Zoe
- Daniel O'Callaghan as chubby businessman
- Landon Runion as Peter Reynard, Zoe's son
- Lauren Marquez as Kayla Reynard, Zoe's daughter
- John Newberg as Balthazar Crayne
- Paul Hall as Marley
- Omar Mughal as handsome man

== Production ==
Principal photography began in November 2012 in Atlanta and the surrounding areas.

== Reception ==
On Rotten Tomatoes, the film has a rating of 7%, based on 14 reviews, with an average rating of 3.05/10. On Metacritic, the film has a score of 32 out of 100, based on 9 critics, indicating "generally unfavorable" reviews.

== See also ==
- List of black films of the 2010s
