= Tasha Smith =

American actress, director and producer

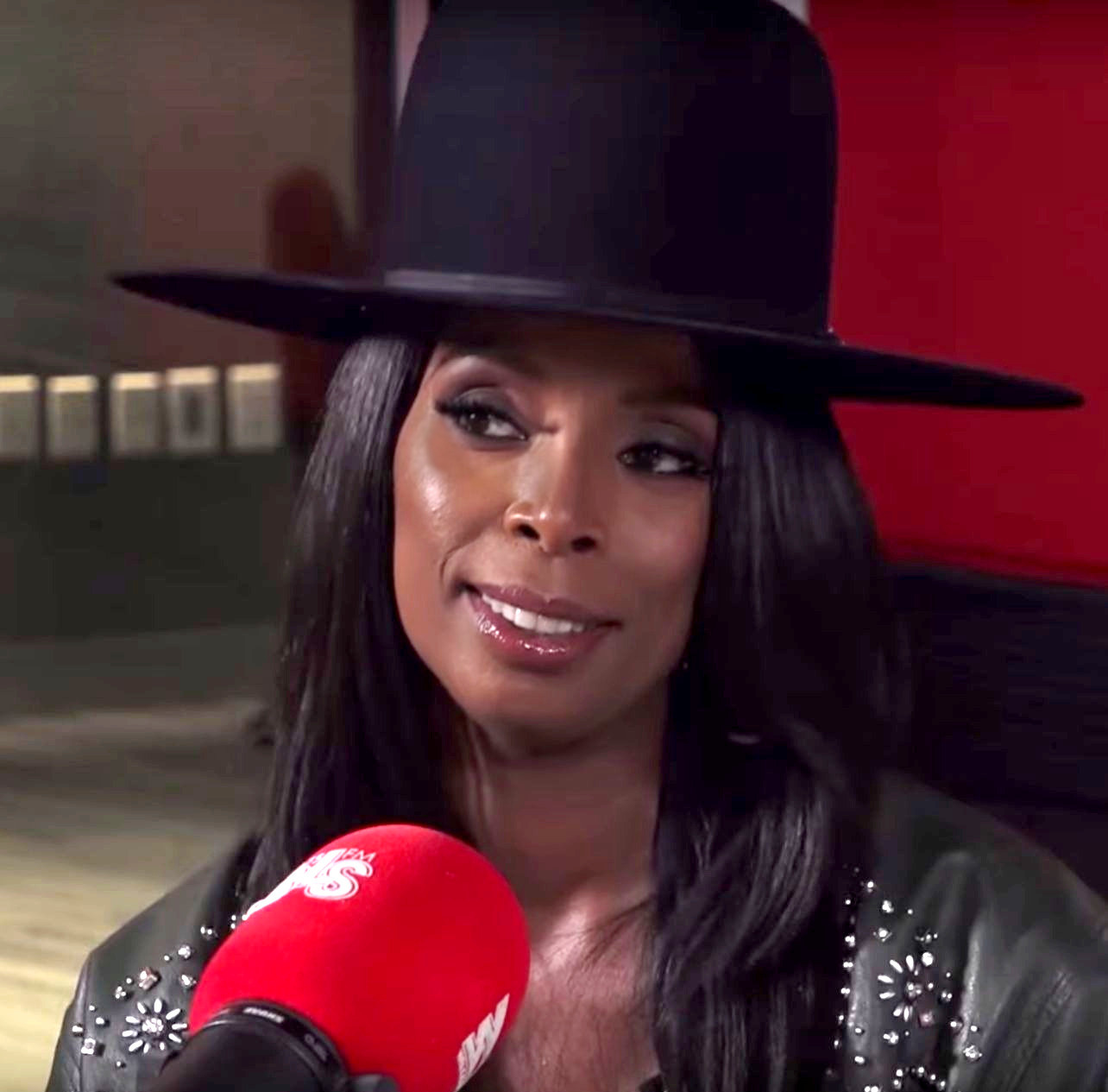
- Smith in 2017
- Born: February 28, 1971 (age 55); Camden, New Jersey, U.S.
- Occupations: Actress, director, producer
- Years active: 1993–present
- Spouse: Rory "Keith" Douglas (m. 2010; ann. 2015)

Tasha Smith (born February 28, 1971) is an American actress and director. She began her career in a starring role on the NBC comedy series Boston Common (1996–97), and later appeared in numerous movies and television series.

Smith has appeared in the films The Whole Ten Yards (2004), Daddy's Little Girls (2007), The Longshots (2008), Couples Retreat (2009), Jumping the Broom (2011), Addicted (2014), Dolemite Is My Name (2019) and Bad Boys: Ride or Die (2024). She starred as Angela Williams in the Tyler Perry films Why Did I Get Married? (2007), its sequel Why Did I Get Married Too? (2010), and on the television series based on the movies, For Better or Worse (2011–2017). From 2015 to 2020, she had a recurring role as Carol Holloway on the Fox musical drama series, Empire. Later in the same year, Smith made her directorial debut.

== Early life and education ==
Tasha Smith was born on February 28, 1971, in Camden, New Jersey, and was raised by a single mother. She has an identical twin sister, Sidra Smith, who currently lives in Harlem and a younger sister named Che' who lives in Georgia. Smith dropped out of Camden High School in her freshman year, and at age 19 moved to California.

== Career ==
Smith made her acting debut with a small role in the comedy film Twin Sitters (1994). From 1996 to 1997, she starred in the NBC comedy series, Boston Common. Later in 1997, she was cast alongside Tom Arnold in another short-lived comedy series, The Tom Show on The WB. In 2000, she had supporting role in the HBO miniseries, The Corner in which she played a drug addict. In the 2000s, Smith had guest starring roles on The Parkers, Without a Trace, Nip/Tuck, and Girlfriends. She has made number of supporting roles in movies such as Playas Ball (2003), The Whole Ten Yards (2004), and ATL (2006).

Smith has played roles in multiple Tyler Perry projects. In 2007, she appeared as the main antagonist in the romantic comedy-drama film, Daddy's Little Girls. She played the role of Angela Williams in the Why Did I Get Married? (2007), and its sequel Why Did I Get Married Too? (2010). The role she later played in the comedy series based on films, Tyler Perry's For Better or Worse.

Smith co-starred alongside Ice Cube and Keke Palmer in the family comedy-drama film, The Longshots (2008). She had supporting role in the romantic comedy film Couples Retreat (2009), and co-starred alongside Salli Richardson, Nicole Ari Parker and Michael B. Jordan in Pastor Brown (2010). In 2011, she appeared in the comedy-drama film Jumping the Broom alongside Angela Bassett and Paula Patton, and in 2014, she played a psychotherapist in the erotic thriller, Addicted. In 2014, she also was cast in a recurring role in the Fox drama series Empire as Carol Hardaway, Cookie Lyon's younger sister.

In 2015, Smith made her directorial debut with the short film Boxed in, which premiered during the 19th Annual American Black Film Festival. In 2017, Smith directed the television film When Love Kills: The Falicia Blakely Story, starring Lil Mama and Lance Gross, based on a true story. It premiered to 1.6 million viewers, ranking as TV One's #1 original movie premiere of all time among all key demos. In October 2017, she also directed an episode in the BET drama anthology series Tales. Smith worked as Mary J. Blige's acting coach for her role in Mudbound.

In 2019, Smith appeared in the comedy-drama film Dolemite Is My Name, and starred opposite Lisa Kudrow and Whitney Cummings in the Amazon comedy pilot Good People. Also that year, she directed episodes of Star, 9-1-1 and Black Lightning. In 2020, Smith directed the episode "Legacy" on the Starz TV series P-Valley. In 2021, Smith directed the Starz drama series Black Mafia Family.

In 2022, it was announced that Smith will be starring in the Lee Daniels's horror/thriller The Deliverance with Mo'Nique, Andra Day, Omar Epps, and Miss Lawrence. In 2022, she had a recurring role during the third season of comedy-drama series, First Wives Club. The following year, Smith starred opposite Michelle Buteau in the Netflix comedy-drama series, Survival of the Thickest. She replaced Theresa Randle in the role of Theresa Burnett in Bad Boys: Ride or Die, which was released on June 7, 2024.

In 2026, Smith directed the drama film, 'Tis So Sweet starring Taraji P. Henson for Netflix and starred in the comedy-drama Why Did I Get Married Again?, a sequel for Why Did I Get Married Too?. Later in 2026 she was announced as director for the comedy film Women Like Us starring Whoopi Goldberg, Jenifer Lewis, Vanessa Williams and Vivica A. Fox and produced by Barack Obama and Michelle Obama.

== Personal life ==
In December 2010, Smith married her boyfriend of one year, Keith Douglas, who was also her manager. In November 2014, Smith appeared in court to request a restraining order against Douglas. In documents filed prior to the court appearance, she accused him of having affairs with other women. Smith's friend Tisha Campbell acted as a character witness. The final divorce decree was issued in March 2015. However, Smith contested the divorce by alleging that Douglas concealed information from her that she should have known before the marriage. Smith alleged that Douglas was not the "man of the cloth" that he presented himself to be during their courtship. She also said that, if she had known about Douglas's background, she would not have married him. The allegations about Douglas's background included five marriages before he married Smith, multiple children that he did not claim and disclose to Smith, and non-payment of income taxes for nearly a decade. The judge in the case granted Smith an annulment of the marriage in December 2015 on the basis of fraud committed by Douglas.

In an interview with D. L. Hughley in 2014, Tasha Smith shared that during most of her teenage years and young adulthood she was an atheist, despite her family being devout religious Christians, because of the "hardships, tragedies, and misfortune she saw her family endure throughout her childhood." However, she said after learning that one of her family members had gotten very sick and she was not able to visit them at the hospital, she decided to turn to prayer "and ask God to show himself to her and help her unbelief." After doing so, she says that she became a devout, practicing Christian and uses her Christian faith as one of her motivators for her career and philanthropy.

Smith is the creator of TSAW, an actor's workshop that empowers and inspires performers at various stages in their careers with focus on the Black community.

== Filmography ==
=== Film ===
Year	Title	Role	Notes
1995	Twin Sitters	The Aleem's Wives	
1995	Let It Be Me	Student	
1998	Max Q	Karen Daniels	TV movie
1999	Chameleon II: Death Match	IBI Director Tasha Webster	TV movie
2003	Playas Ball	Vonda Watson	
2004	The Whole Ten Yards	Jules "Julie" Figueroa	
2004	My Purple Fur Coat	Ruth Smith	Short
2006	Miles from Home	Keisha Knight	
2006	ATL	Gayle	
2006	You, Me and Dupree	Co-Worker	
2006	Glass House: The Good Mother	Caseworker Niecy Jameson	Video
2007	Love... & Other 4 Letter Words	Lucille Ames	
2007	Daddy's Little Girls	Jennifer Jackson	
2007	Why Did I Get Married?	Angela Williams	
2008	The Longshots	Claire Plummer	
2009	Pastor Brown	Angelique Todd	
2009	End of the Line	Woman 3	Short
2009	Couples Retreat	Jennifer	
2010	Why Did I Get Married Too?	Angela Williams	
2010	Something Like a Business	Angela	
2011	Jumping the Broom	Shonda Peterkin	
2014	Addicted	Dr. Marcella Spencer	
2015	Stock Option	LaTonja	TV movie
2016	Polaris	Sophie	
2017	Snowed-Inn Christmas	Simone Jenkins	TV movie
2018	Running Out of Time	Brenda	
2019	The One You Never Forget	Sherry	Short
2019	Dolemite Is My Name	Jimmy's Wife	
2024	Bad Boys: Ride or Die	Theresa Burnett	
2024	The Deliverance	Pastor Powell	
2025	Twinless	Charlotte	
2025	Desire: A Temptations Story	Kendra	
2026	Why Did I Get Married Again?	Angela	Post-production

=== Television ===
Year	Title	Role	Notes
1993	The Sinbad Show	Seville	Episode: "I Coulda' Been the Man"
1995	Def Comedy Jam	Herself	Episode: "Episode #4.9"
1996	Soul Train	Herself/Guest Host	Episode: "Immature/AZ Yet/Shades"
1996–97	Boston Common	Tasha King	Main Cast
1997	Chicago Hope	Dr. Denise Potter	Episode: "Brain Salad Surgery"
1997–98	The Tom Show	Tanya Cole	Main Cast
1999	The Steve Harvey Show	Kimberly Davis	Episode: "Steve Don't Get Nun"
2000	The Corner	Veronica 'Ronnie' Boice	Main Cast
2001	The Parkers	Rachel Jones	Episode: "A Knockout Times Two"
2003	Without a Trace	Veronica Boyce	Episode: "The Friendly Skies"
2004–06	America's Next Top Model	Herself	Guest Cast: Season 2 & 7
2004	Nip/Tuck	Carol Nelson	Episode: "Joan Rivers"
2005	Second Time Around	Laura James	Episode: "Big Bank, Little Bank"
2005	Girlfriends	Shandara Durrani	Episode: "See J-Spot Run"
2007	All of Us	Jewel Jones	Episode: "The B-R-E-A-K-U-P"
2009	The Game	Sheila	Episode: "The Third Legacy"
2009	unReal Housewives of Kansas City	Rochae Bastillion	Main Cast
2009–10	Meet the Browns	Tanya Gould	Recurring Cast: Season 2-3
2010	Private Chefs of Beverly Hills	Herself	Episode: "Challah Back"
2011	Glory Daze	Herself	Episode: "Hit Me With Your Test Shot"
2011	The Hot 10	Herself	Episode: "Episode #1.12"
2011–17	For Better or Worse	Angela Williams	Main Cast, 162 episodes Nominated —NAACP Image Award for Outstanding Actress in a Comedy Series
2013–14	The Chew	Herself/Guest Co-Host	Recurring Guest Co-Host: Season 3
2014	Chopped	Herself/Contestant	Episode: "Chopped Tournament of Stars: Actors!"
2015	Power	Jarita J.	Recurring Cast: Season 2
2015–20	Empire	Carol Holloway	Recurring Cast
2016	RuPaul's Drag Race	Herself/Guest Judge	Episode: "RuCo's Empire"
2017	Daytime Divas	Portia Camden	Episode: "Shut It Down"
2017	Star	Carol Holloway	Episode: "The Winner Takes It All"
2018	Unsung	Herself	Episode: "Digable Planets"
2018	In Contempt	Donielle Lyons	Episode: "Necessary Force"
2018	Rel	Monique	Episode: "Brittany's Mom"
2019	Uncensored	Herself	Episode: "Tasha Smith"
2022	First Wives Club	Savannah	Recurring Cast: Season 3
2023–2025	Survival of the Thickest	Marley	Recurring Cast: Season 1, Main Cast: Season 2
2026	9-1-1	Gabi Bond	Recurring Cast: Season 9

=== Directing ===
==== Film ====
Year	Film	Credited as				
Year	Film	Director	Writer	Producer	Actor	Role
2015	Boxed In (Short film)	Yes	Yes	Yes	No	
2017	When Love Kills: The Falicia Blakely Story	Yes	No	Yes	No	
2026	Give Me Some Sugah	Yes	No	Yes	Yes	
TBA	Women Like Us	Yes	No	Yes	No	

==== Television ====
Year	Title	Season	Episode
2015	Boxed In (Short)		
2017	When Love Kills: The Falicia Blakely Story (TV movie)		
2017	Tales	Season 1	"99 Problems"
2019	Star	Season 3	"Square One"
2019	Star	Season 3	"Toxic"
2019	Tales	Season 2	"My Life"
2019	Black Lightning	Season 3	"The Book of Resistance: Chapter Four: Earth Crisis"
2019	9-1-1	Season 3	"Athena Begins"
2020	P-Valley	Season 1	"Legacy"
2020	Big Sky	Season 1	"Unfinished Business"
2021	9-1-1	Season 4	"First Responders"
2021	Our Kind of People	Season 1	"My Mother, Myself"
2021	Our Kind of People	Season 1	"Reparations"
2021	Big Sky	Season 2	"You Have To Play Along"
2021	Black Mafia Family	Season 1	"See It... Touch It... Obtain It"
2021	Black Mafia Family	Season 1	"Rumors"
2021	Black Mafia Family	Season 1	"The King of Detroit"
2022-2023	Bel-Air	Season 1	"PA to LA"
2022	The Ms. Pat Show	Season 2	AAFCA Award for Best Director
2023	Mayor of Kingstown	Season 2	"Live at Five"
2023	Mayor of Kingstown	Season 2	"The Pool"
2023	Bel-Air	Season 2	"Just Like Old Times"
2025	Harlem	Season 3	2 episodes
2025	The Equalizer	Season 5	"Taken"
2025	The Rookie	Season 7	"Chaos Agent"
2025	Survival of the Thickest	Season 2	2 episodes Nominated — Black Reel Awards for Television for Outstanding Directing in a Comedy Series
