= Den of Thieves (company) =

American television production company

Den of Thieves is an American television production company. Founded by Jesse Ignjatovic and Evan Prager, the company primarily produces television specials and award shows, including the MTV Video Music Awards, the iHeartRadio Music Awards, the People's Choice Awards, and the Peabody Awards.

== History ==
Jesse Ignjatovic and Evan Prager had first met in New York City while working for MTV and Epic Records respectively. In 2006, Ignjatovic left MTV to pursue the formation of a studio with Prager in Los Angeles, which would be known as Den of Thieves. On his last day with the network, Ignjatovic would pitch a new concept for the MTV Video Music Awards to an MTV executive—a development that led to Den of Thieves being brought on to produce the 2007 event. While marred by Britney Spears' poorly-received opening performance and complaints by Kanye West over the ceremony's format (which divided performances between a main stage and various suites at the Palms Casino Resort), he considered it to be "an iconic show for me and Evan".

In 2017, it produced a revival of the talent competition game show The Gong Show for ABC with Will Arnett and Sony Pictures Television.

In 2018, Den of Thieves became producer of the People's Choice Awards with its move to E!.

In October 2019, Brent Montgomery's Wheelhouse Entertainment acquired a majority stake in Den of Thieves.
