= MTV Video Music Award for Quadruple Threat of the Year =

Annual music video award

The MTV Video Music Award for Quadruple Threat of the Year was introduced in 2007, as the VMAs were revamped that year and a few new categories were introduced to the show. This award was peculiar for the MTV Video Music Awards, though, for (like Best Artist Website in 1999) it did not reward music nor music videos. Instead, the category awarded musical artists who excelled in at least three other areas beside their music career, such as acting, entrepreneurship, and activism, among others. When the VMAs returned to their old format in 2008, though, this category did not come back.

Year	Winner	Other nominees	Ref.
2007	Justin Timberlake	Beyoncé; Bono; Jay-Z; Kanye West	
