= Rockstar Mentality =

Studio album by Shop Boyz
- Released: June 19, 2007
- Recorded: 2005–07
- Genres: Hip hop; rap rock
- Length: 47:17
- Label: Universal Republic Records
- Producers: Cal Rip; David Banner; Fire; Jim Jonsin; Neff-U; Pit; The Original Dream Team

Singles from Rockstar Mentality
- 1. "Party Like a Rockstar" Released: April 10, 2007; 2. "They Like Me" Released: 2007

Rockstar Mentality is the only studio album by American Southern rap rock group Shop Boyz. It was released on June 19, 2007, through Universal Republic Records. Production was handled by Jason Pittman, Jim Jonsin, Ron "Neff-U" Feemster, Cal Rip, David Banner, Richard Harris III, and The Original Dream Team, with Billy Hume serving as an additional producer on two tracks.

The album debuted at number 11 on the Billboard 200 with 52,000 copies sold in the U.S. in its first week. Its lead single "Party Like a Rockstar" peaked at number two on the Billboard Hot 100, and the follow-up single "They Like Me" made it to number 98 on the same chart.

Cover of the second single from Rockstar Mentality, "They Like Me"

== Critical reception ==
Professional ratings
Review scores
Source	Rating
AllMusic	2/5 stars
Now	1/5
PopMatters	4/10
RapReviews	5.5/10
Rolling Stone	2/5 stars
USA Today	2/4 stars

AllMusic's Marisa Brown felt the album lacked "creative spontaneity" when compared to similar rap rock acts like Linkin Park and Outkast, criticizing the "formulaic and contrived" tracks for the rappers' unremarkable verses and the repetitive "singsongy hooks", concluding that: "Shop Boyz and their producers are looking for that grit and pomp that attract audiences to rock music (and rock stars), but instead they end up with a boy band version of it, which is OK, if that's what you're looking for." Jason Richards of NOW critiqued about the group's "hood rock" style using "typical Roland 808 beats with electric guitars geared toward the ringtone market", concluding with: "They try to make up for their hot garbage rhymes with as many repetitive hooks as possible. This album killed a piece of my soul." Susan Kim of RapReviews was critical of the various mediocre tracks with comparable production and elementary lyrics, but commended the group for experimenting with their "hood rock" sound on "Rollin'", "Baby Girl", the title track and "They Like Me". She critiqued that the record is "neither "hood" nor "rock." It has become a disarrangement of sound that is difficult to categorize, as the less than substantial incorporation of electric guitars cannot constitute the music as rock." USA Today's Steve Jones wrote that "their "hood rock" style doesn't exactly push the envelope with new lyrical or sonic ideas. Still, the fusion cuts are more forward-thinking than the album's more conventional tracks." Quentin B Huff of PopMatters felt the tracks overall were "slightly more comfortable in their rock nods" than their hip-hop predecessors, concluding that: "Whether all this rock stuff is novelty or not, time will tell, as we can rest assured that the monstrous popularity of "Party Like a Rockstar" will likely follow the crew henceforth. That's the nature of the business."

== Track listing ==
No.	Title	Writer(s)	Producer(s)	Length
1.	"Party Like a Rockstar"	Demetrius Hardin; Rasheed Hightower; Richard Stephens; Brian Ward; Jason C. Pittman	Pit	4:13
2.	"Bowen Homes"	Hardin; Hightower; Stephens; Ward; Richard Harris III	Fire	4:37
3.	"Baby Girl"	Hardin; Hightower; Stephens; Ward; James Scheffer	Jim Jonsin	2:53
4.	"They Like Me"	Hardin; Hightower; Stephens; Lavell Crump	David Banner	3:16
5.	"Next to Me"	Hardin; Hightower; Stephens; Ward; Michael D. Hartnett; Pittman	Pit	4:10
6.	"Rollin'"	Hardin; Hightower; Stephens; Ward; William Whedbee; Pittman	Pit; Billy Hume (add.)	3:48
7.	"Rockstar Mentality"	Hardin; Hightower; Stephens; Ward; Theron Feemster	NEFF-U	3:25
8.	"Flexin'"	Hardin; Hightower; Stephens; Ward; Scheffer	Jim Jonsin	3:22
9.	"Totally Dude"	Hardin; Hightower; Stephens; Ward; Darrin Williams; Lynell Boone; Michael Macon; Turinida Sylvester	The Original Dream Team	4:13
10.	"Showin' Me Love"	Hardin; Hightower; Stephens; Ward; Feemster	NEFF-U	2:54
11.	"My Car"	Hardin; Hightower; Stephens; Ward; Pittman	Pit	3:25
12.	"Sumthin' to Talk 'Bout"	Hardin; Hightower; Stephens; Ward; Pittman	Pit	3:36
13.	"World on Fire"	Hardin; Hightower; Stephens; Ward; Calvin Miller	Cal Rip; Billy Hume (add.)	3:25
Total length:				47:17

Bonus track
No.	Title	Length
14.	"Paper (M-O-N-E-Y)"	3:19

Sample credits

- Track 3 contains elements of the composition "One Thing Leads to Another" written by Adam Woods, Jamie West-Oram, Rupert Greenall, Alfie Agius and Cy Curnin.

== Personnel ==
Shop Boyz

- Brian "Bingo" Ward – vocals, executive producer
- Demetrius "Meany" Hardin – vocals
- Rasheed "Sheed" Hightower – vocals
- Richard "Fat" Stephens – vocals

Additional musicians

- William "Billy Hume" Whedbee – guitar (tracks: 1, 13), additional guitar (track 6), bass (tracks: 11, 13), additional producer (tracks: 6, 13), mixing (tracks: 1, 2, 5, 6, 9, 11–13)
- Frank Romano – guitar (tracks: 3, 8)
- Eric Live Florence – guitar (track 4)
- Willie "Get Cool" Poole – keyboards (track 4)
- Keaunda Thomas – backing vocals (track 5)
- Mike Hartnett – guitar (tracks: 5, 6, 11, 12), bass (tracks: 6, 11, 12)
- Darrin Williams – guitar & producer (track 9)
- Jordan Ware – violin (track 9)

Technicals

- Jason "Pit" Pittman – producer (tracks: 1, 5, 6, 11, 12)
- Richard "Fire" Harris III – producer (track 2)
- James "Jim Jonsin" Scheffer – producer (tracks: 3, 8)
- Lavell "David Banner" Crump – producer (track 4)
- Ron "Neff-U" Feemstar – producer (tracks: 7, 10)
- Lynell Boone – producer (track 9)
- Michael Macon – producer (track 9)
- Turinida Sylvester – producer (track 9)
- Calvin "Cal Rip" Miller – producer (track 13)
- Joel Mullis – mixing (track 2)
- Rob Marks – mixing & recording (tracks: 3, 8)
- John Frye – mixing (track 4)
- Kori Anders – recording (track 4)
- Gary Fly – mixing assistant (track 4)
- Stephen Nowoczynski – recording (tracks: 6, 11–13)
- Bob Horn – mixing & recording (tracks: 7, 10)
- Tom Coyne – mastering

== Charts ==
=== Weekly charts ===
Chart (2007)	Peak position
US Billboard 200	11
US Top R&B/Hip-Hop Albums (Billboard)	4
US Top Rap Albums (Billboard)	2

=== Year-end charts ===
Chart (2007)	Position
US Top R&B/Hip-Hop Albums (Billboard)	100
