= Playas Ball =

- Directed by: Jennifer Harper
- Written by: Jennifer Harper
- Story by: Dale Davis; Jennifer Harper
- Produced by: Jeff Clanagan; Kim Olgetree; Ruth Carson
- Starring: Allen Payne; Elise Neal; Treach; Chelsi Smith; Jordana Spiro; Anthony C. Hall; Tasha Smith; Tracey Cherelle Jones; MC Lyte; Gary "G-Thang" Johnson; Jackie Long; David Brown; Matthew Hatchette
- Cinematography: Robert Morris
- Edited by: David Flores; Debra Moore
- Music by: Eddie "Debongo" Ricketts; Bruce Sterling
- Distributed by: CodeBlack Entertainment
- Release date: October 1, 2003
- Running time: 88 minutes
- Country: United States
- Language: English

Playas Ball is a 2003 sports, comedy, drama, and romance movie that was written and directed by Jennifer Harper and produced by Dale Davis. It stars Allen Payne and Elise Neal. The film was released on October 1, 2003 by CodeBlack Entertainment.

== Plot ==
Allen Payne plays a basketball player who becomes involved in a sex scandal.

== Cast ==
- Allen Payne as Cedric Tinsley, a ball player trying to go from rags to riches
- Elise Neal as Summer Twitty, Cedric's publicist
- Anthony 'Treach' Criss as Ricardo Perez, Summer's boyfriend
- Chelsi Smith as Jill Hamlin, Cedric's girlfriend
- Jordana Spiro as Tonya Jenkins, mother of Cedric's purported child
- Antony C. Hall as Lloyd Harrison, Cedric's best friend
- Tasha Smith as Vonda, Cedric's sister
- Tracey Cherelle Jones as Natasha, Summer's cousin
- MC Lyte as Laquinta, Natasha's best friend
- Gary "G-Thang" Johnson as Hakim, a chef at Cedric's favorite restaurant
- Jackie Long as Georgie, another chef at Cedric's favorite restaurant
- David Brown as Mookie, Cedric's second best friend
- Matthew Hatchette as Nick, Cedric's third best friend
- Pamella D'Pella as Kennedy, the bartender

=== Cameos ===
- Judge Joe Brown as himself
- Malik Yoba as himself
- Paula Jai Parker as herself
- Derek Anderson as himself
- Scottie Pippen as himself
- Dale Davis as himself

== Release ==
=== Home media ===
Playas Ball was released on February 6, 2007 on DVD.
