= Mishon Ratliff =

American singer, dancer and actor (born 1993)

- Born: Mishon Tarique Ratliff; February 3, 1993 (age 33); Los Angeles, California, U.S.
- Genre: R&B
- Occupations: Singer, dancer, actor
- Years active: 2004–present
- Labels: Dynasty Records, Columbia, Interscope, Streamline, Zone 4
- Website: www.mishon.net

Mishon Tarique Ratliff (born February 3, 1993) is an American singer, dancer and actor. Though he's been singing and performing on stage since the age of 6, he is best known for his portrayal of Taylor "Tay" Sutton on the ABC Family drama television series Lincoln Heights. He has appeared on music television broadcast such as Soul Train, America's Most Talented Kid, The Mo'Nique Show and BET's 106 & Park. As well as being an artist/actor, Mishon is a musician who plays the keyboard and both acoustic/electric guitar.

== Discography ==
=== Studio albums ===
List of albums, (with selected chart positions)
| Title | Details | Peak Chart Positions | | |
| Title | Details | US | US R&B | US Rap |
|---|---|---|---|---|
| Youngstars | Release: September 13, 2005; Label: Dynasty Records; Format: CD, Digital Download | — | — | — |

=== Extended plays ===
| Title | Details |
|---|---|
| Break You Off | Release: May 10, 2005; Label: Dynasty Records; Format: Digital Download, EP |
| Dorm Room Music | Release: May 1, 2012; Label: Dynasty Records; Format: Digital Download, EP |
| Gambit | Release: November 9, 2026; Label: HOYO-MiX / Sān-Z STUDIO; Format: Digital Download, EP |

=== Mixtapes ===
| Title | Details |
|---|---|
| The Homecoming | Release: August 1, 2010; Hosted by DJ Quest Da Champ & Coast 2 Coast Mixtapes; Format: Digital Download |
| Introducing: Young Hustle | Release: June 25, 2011; Hosted by Bigga Rankin & DJ Smallz; Format: Digital Download |
| The Gift | Release: February 14, 2013; Hosted by DJ Era; Format: Digital Download |

=== Singles ===
==== As lead artist ====
| Year | Title | Peak position | Album |
| Year | Title | US R&B | Album |
|---|---|---|---|
| 2005 | "Break You Off" | — | Youngsters |
| 2005 | "You're The One" | — | Youngsters |
| 2008 | "Excuse Me Mama" | — | Non-album single |
| 2009 | "Just A Kiss" | 36 | Non-album single |
| 2010 | "Turn It Up" (featuring Lil Mama and Roscoe Dash) | 80 | Non-album single |

==== As featured artist ====
| Title | Year | Peak chart positions | Album |
| Title | Year | US R&B | Album |
|---|---|---|---|
| "New Money" (Lil Twist featuring Mishon) | 2010 | 80 | Non-album single |

== Filmography ==
Films

| Year | Title | Role | Notes |
|---|---|---|---|
| 2006 | Akeelah and the Bee | Unknown | Uncredited Role |
| 2007 | The Heartbreak Kid | Baseball Kid | Support Role |
| 2012 | To Love And To Cherish | Wesley | Support Role |
| 2012 | Note To Self | Sean Martin | Support Role |
| 2013 | Frat Brothers | Kyle Cooper | Main Role |

Television

| Year | Title | Role | Notes |
|---|---|---|---|
| 2006-09 | Lincoln Heights | Taylor 'Tay' Sutton | Main Role |
| 2019 | Last Call | Cary Thyme | Main Role |

Theatre

| Year | Title | Role | Notes |
|---|---|---|---|
| 2012 | David E. Talbert's A Fool And His Money | James Jr. | Main/Support Role |
