= G-Slide (Tour Bus) =

2007 single by Lil Mama

Single by Lil Mama

from the album VYP (Voice of the Young People)
- Released: September 25, 2007
- Studio: Legacy Recording (New York City); Sarm West (London)
- Genre: Hip hop; snap
- Length: 3:25
- Label: Jive
- Songwriter(s): Niatia Kirkland; Lukasz Gottwald; Derryl Howard; Maurice Wison; Brian Singleton
- Producer(s): Dr. Luke; The Beatstaz

Lil Mama singles chronology
"Girlfriend (Dr. Luke remix)" (2007)	"G-Slide (Tour Bus)" (2007)	"Shawty Get Loose" (2008)

Music video
- "G-Slide (Tour Bus)" on YouTube

"G-Slide (Tour Bus)" is a song by American rapper Lil Mama from her debut studio album VYP (Voice of the Young People) (2008). It was released exclusively in New Zealand as the second single from the album on September 25, 2007, by Jive Records. The song was written by Lil Mama, Dr. Luke, Derryl Howard, Maurice Wison, and Brian Singleton, while production was helmed solely by Dr. Luke.

The chorus to the song is set to the tune of "The Wheels on the Bus", a popular infant's rhyme.

The song was featured in the film I'm in Love with a Stripper. The song only received a commercial release in New Zealand, in the U.S. the commercial single was cancelled. However, after the film How She Move was released in movie theaters.

Lil Wayne and Juelz Santana made an unofficial remix to this song called "Do My Thang". This song is also referenced in the Superspiz song "Make You Dance".

== Music video ==
The music video was premiered on August 31, 2007 on Yahoo! Music. On MTV, Total Request Live was premiered on September 11, 2007 and debuted at number three on October 1, 2007 and so far been on the countdown four days. Lil Mama made the choreography.

On BET's 106 & Park, was premiered on September 13, 2007.

The video starts with Lil Mama talking to a producer about her single "Lip Gloss" and saying how big "Tour Bus" will be. (Note that when she leaves the building, the maroon awning reads "CHATEAU MAMA" in white letters.) Then, her little sister tells her she doesn't have a tour bus. Using her magic dance moves, she creates one.

The next scene shows kids in a neighborhood dancing, when an ice cream truck with lip gloss inside comes. Lil' Mama and some other girls grab it and start applying.

After this, the screen turns darker and the beat changes considerably; from nursery rhyme to rap. Lil' Mama and some backup dancers are then seen dancing. It then cuts to daytime where the children from the intro are shown singing the chorus of the song, after which the song ends.

=== How She Move version ===
The How She Move version is very similar to the original, but it has clips from the movie, and it reads "How She Move" on a building.

== Track listing ==
1. "G-Slide (Tour Bus)" (Radio version)
2. "G-Slide (Tour Bus)" (Instrumental)
3. "G-Slide (Tour Bus)" (Video version)
4. "G-Slide (Tour Bus)" (A cappella)

== Charts ==
Peak chart positions of "G-Slide (Tour Bus)"
Chart (2007)	Peak position
New Zealand (Recorded Music NZ)	8
