= VYP (Voice of the Young People) =

Studio album by Lil Mama
- Released: April 29, 2008
- Recorded: 2007–2008
- Genres: Hip hop; dance; R&B
- Length: 59:07
- Labels: Zomba, Jive
- Producers: Familiar Mindz (exec.), Xtramile Productions (exec.), Matt Beckley, Benny Blanco, James Chambers, Cool & Dre, Paul Diaz, Dr. Luke, Tatiana Gottwald, Malissa "Mali" Hunter, Justin C. Johnson, Marv Johnson, Scott Storch, The Runners, Tuneheadz Productions, Peter Toh, Danja, Clubba Langg, Carl Shackelton, T-Pain

Lil Mama chronology
VYP (Voice of the Young People) (2008)	Take Me Back (2015)

Singles from VYP: Voice of the Young People
- 1. "Lip Gloss" Released: June 19, 2007; 2. "G-Slide (Tour Bus)" Released: September 25, 2007; 3. "Shawty Get Loose" Released: February 11, 2008; 4. "What It Is (Strike a Pose)" Released: August 2008

Professional ratings
Review scores
Source	Rating
AllMusic	3.5/5 stars
Associated Press	(positive)
RapReviews	7.5/10 stars
Rolling Stone	3/5 stars
US Weekly	3/5 stars
DJBooth.net	3/5 stars
USA Today	2.5/4 stars

VYP (Voice of the Young People) is the only studio album by American rapper Lil Mama, released in April 2008, which includes the singles "Lip Gloss", "G-Slide (Tour Bus)", and "Shawty Get Loose" (featuring Chris Brown and T-Pain). A fourth single, "What It Is (Strike a Pose)" was released in July 2008, replacing "L.I.F.E." Producers included Cool & Dre, Scott Storch, The Runners and Dr. Luke. It debuted at number 25 on the U.S. Billboard 200 chart and later sold over 66,200 U.S. copies.

== Track listing ==
1. "Intro" – 1:08
2. "Lip Gloss" – 4:04
3. "One Hit Wonder" (featuring DJ Khaled) – 3:27
4. "Get Loose Request" – 0:11
5. "Shawty Get Loose" (featuring Chris Brown and T-Pain) – 3:34
6. "What It Is (Strike a Pose)" (featuring T-Pain) – 3:58
7. "G-Slide (Tour Bus)" (featuring Kadar) – 3:31
8. "Gotta Go Deeper Skit" – 0:14
9. "Stand Up" – 3:36
10. "L.I.F.E " – 3:57
11. "College" (featuring Yirayah) – 4:00
12. "Emotional Rollercoasters Skit" – 0:28
13. "Broken Pieces" – 3:47
14. "Swim" – 4:22
15. "Truly in Love" (featuring Peter Toh) – 4:07
16. "Look at My Life Skit" – 1:01
17. "Make It Hot (Put It Down)" – 3:13
18. "Pick It Up" – 3:45

=== Japanese bonus ===
19. "Never Let Go" – 4:02

=== Deluxe edition bonuses ===
19. "On Fire" – 3:15
20. "Girlfriend" (Dr. Luke remix; Avril Lavigne featuring Lil Mama)

== DVD ==
A concurrent DVD contains music videos for "Lip Gloss" and "Shawty Get Loose".

== Charts ==
Chart	Position
U.S. Billboard 200	25
U.S. Top R&B/Hip-Hop Albums	5
U.S. Top Rap Albums	3
