= Lil Mama =

American rapper (born 1989)

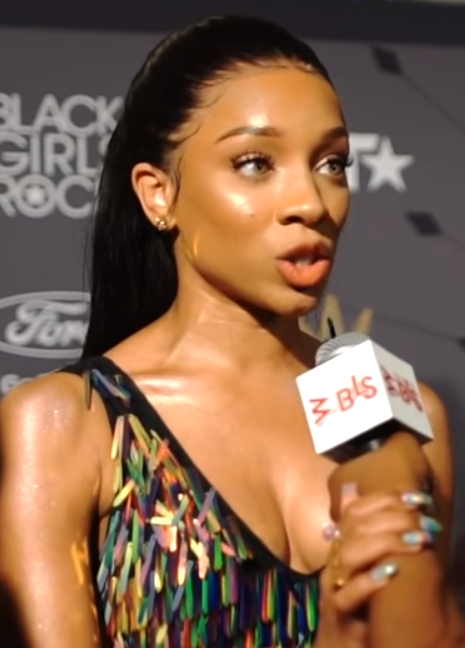
- Lil Mama in 2018

Background information
- Born: Niatia Jessica Kirkland; October 4, 1989 (age 37); New York City, U.S.
- Genre: Hip-hop
- Occupations: Rapper; singer; songwriter; dancer; actress
- Years active: 2006–present
- Labels: Jive; RCA; Zomba

Niatia Jessica Kirkland (born October 4, 1989), better known by her stage name Lil Mama, is an American rapper. She released her debut album, VYP (Voice of the Young People) in 2008. The album debuted at number 25 on the Billboard 200 and spawned her four singles including "Lip Gloss.” The project received two Teen Choice Awards and Monster Single of the Year nominations at the MTV Video Music Awards. Kirkland gained further attention in pop music after a collaboration with Avril Lavigne for the remix of the single "Girlfriend."

Kirkland took a hiatus from music after her single "Hustler Girl," to appear as a judge for a total of seven seasons on MTV's America's Best Dance Crew at the age of 18 from 2008 to 2012. Working with producer and fellow judge Randy Jackson, she appeared alongside JC Chasez, Shane Sparks, Mario Lopez, and Layla Kayleigh.

She was cast as Lisa "Left Eye" Lopes in the VH1 biographical film CrazySexyCool: The TLC Story, which aired in October 2013 and garnered 4.5 million views on the first night. Kirkland later joined TLC on their tour for their last album. She also performed a tribute to Lopes at the 2013 American Music Awards performing the song "Waterfalls.”

Kirkland continued to remain in the public eye, returning to music and making new tracks with fellow rapper MC Lyte on her single "Ball.” She appeared on Growing Up Hip Hop: Atlanta. In 2019, she starred in the film All In, alongside Traci Braxton.

== Career ==
=== 2006–2012: VYP (Voice of the Young People) and turmoil ===
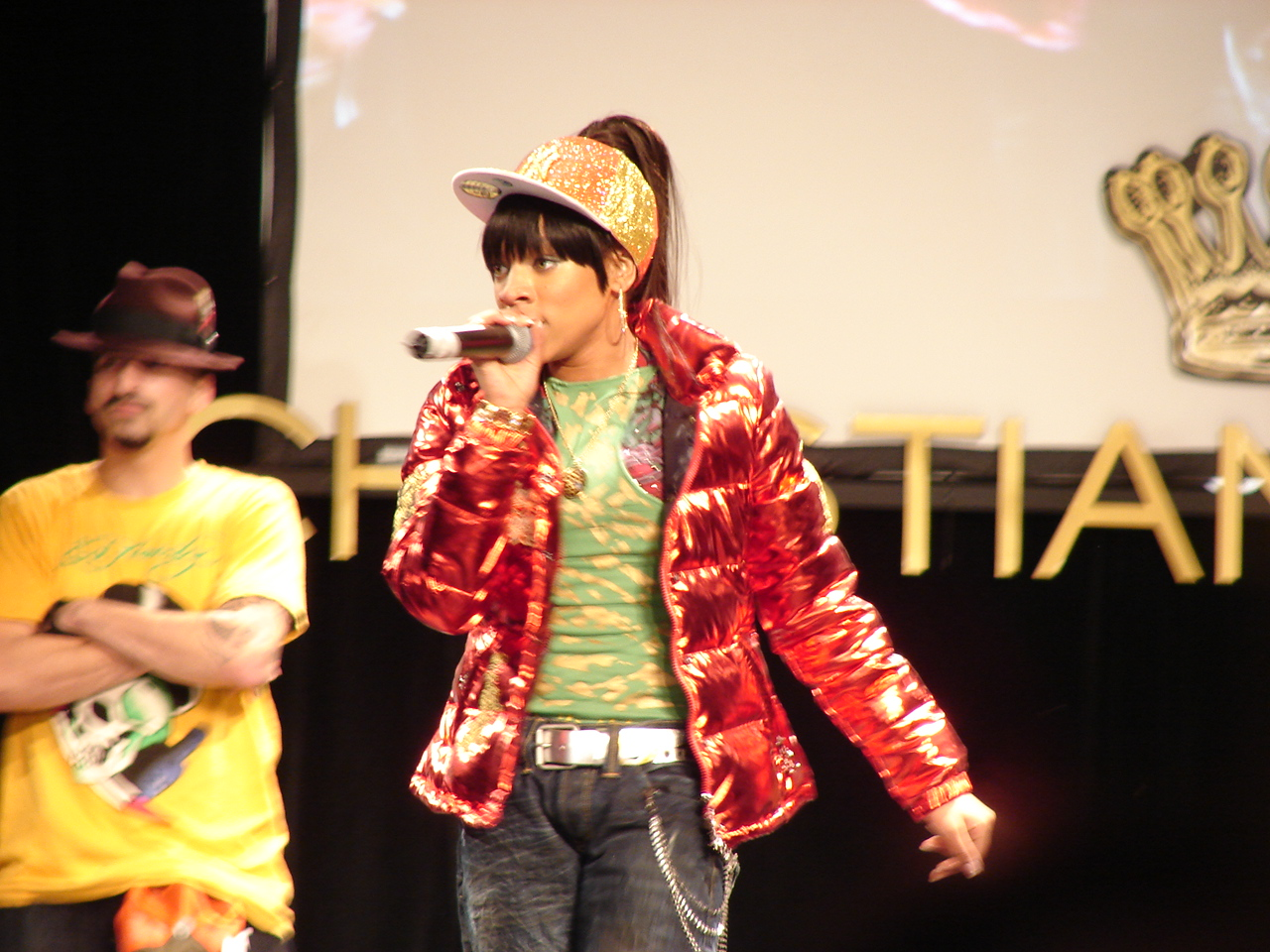
Lil Mama performing in 2008

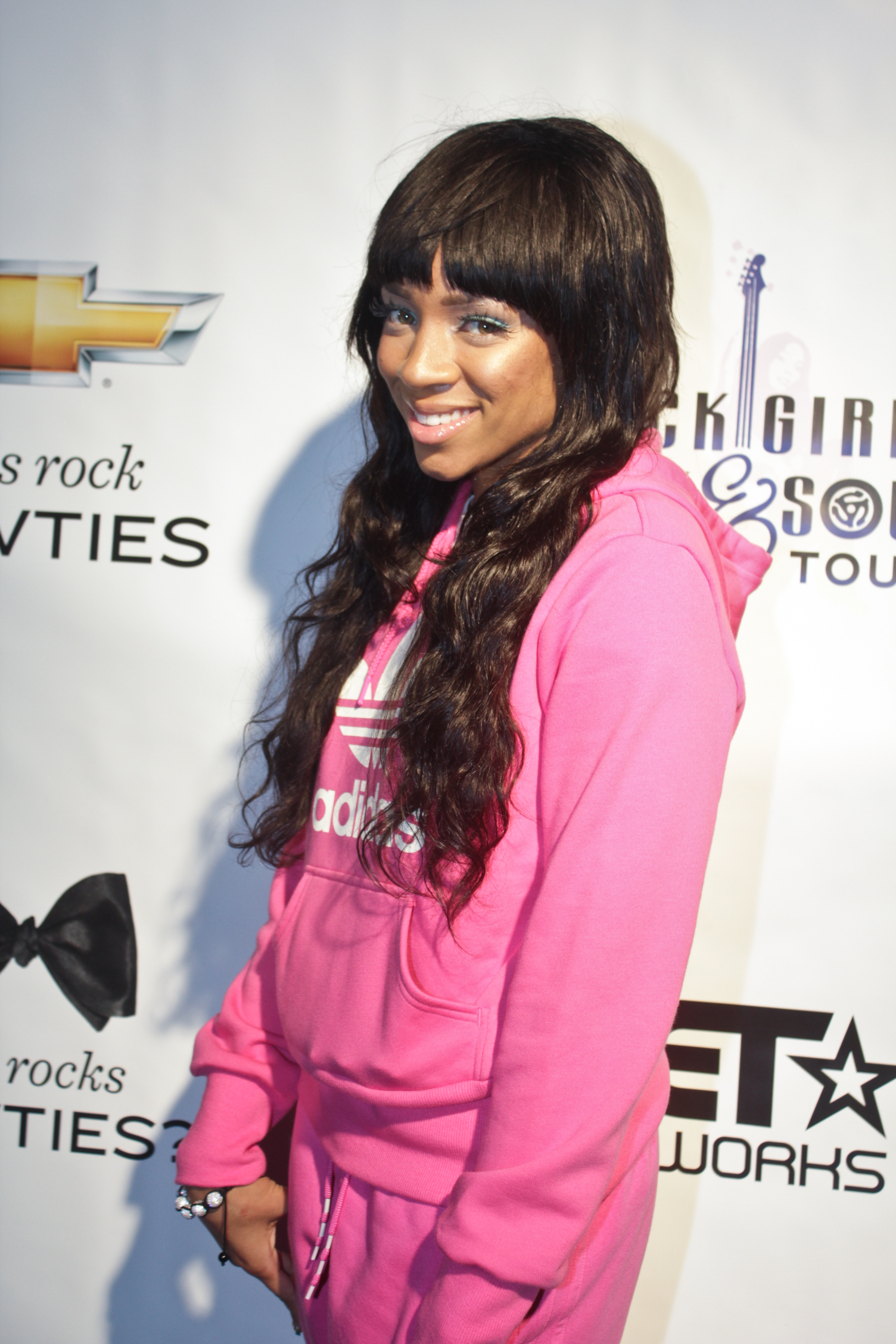
Lil Mama at the Black Girls Rock! and Soul Tour in New York City, 2011

She first introduced herself as the "Birth of Hip-Pop" at the 2007 MTV Video Music Awards sporting a baby-styled look. She later told MTV how she intended to spread and influence more artists to spread the genre of hip-pop. After her 2009 re-release of her single "L.I.F.E.", Kirkland introduced her fans to a whole new side of the darker reality that young people face. The song was followed by a music video that incorporated the themes of the song which included teen pregnancy, drug addiction, child abandonment, domestic violence, and more.

Since the release of her first album, Kirkland has been in and out of studios making new music. She released the single "Doughboy" (featuring Mishon). After that release she made appearances on tracks with other artists, including "Turn It Up" by Mishon and "Sexiest" by Yahaira. She also released "On & On & On" and "NY NY LA LA" (featuring Snoop Dogg). The two singles were intended to be a part of her second studio album, but instead they were released on iTunes and digital download but were later removed for unknown reasons. She then released two more singles entitled "Scrawberry" and "Hustler Girl", both singles were followed by music videos. "Scrawberry" introduced a new look for Kirkland, in which she would wear colorful wigs and futuristic attire; this would be her new style for next few years; however, the song was released on her MySpace page and YouTube, it was unclear if it was removed from streaming services along with her other two singles.

Kirkland was featured on Lil Wayne's "A Milli"; she was brought on stage at his concerts to perform the song. Kirkland was featured in the Grammy Award-nominated album First Love by Karina Pasian, a close friend to Kirkland and a veteran music artist. In 2009, she announced the title of her proposed sophomore album as Voice of the Young People: I Am That after her single "What It Is (Strike a Pose)" failed to chart. The song was the last single with a music video to be added to her album and was used to commercialize the album. The song failed to chart.

On October 7, 2012, RCA Music Group announced it was disbanding J Records along with Arista Records and Jive Records. With the shutdown, Kirkland (and all other artists previously signed to these three labels) would release future material on the RCA Records brand. However, Kirkland had left Jive before the transition to RCA; she stated in an interview that she was not in the right space to make music and decided to take a hiatus. Voice of the Young People: I Am That would have had guest appearances including Soulja Boy, Khalil, Angel Haze, LoLa Monroe, Teyana Taylor, Trina, Keke Palmer, Nas, and Chris Brown, among others. Due to her leaving Jive, the album never saw a release and instead it along with the few singles recorded with Zomba Records were shelved, but she managed to release some the songs directly online for her fans which included "Scrawberry", "On & On & On", and "NY NY LA LA". The other singles she planned to record with the featured artist were never recorded and were disbanded. After leaving Jive, Kirkland became an independent artist.

On June 13, 2012, America's Best Dance Crew came to a series finale. Kirkland had served as a judge for a total of seven seasons. The following year, she released a single titled "Bad as Me" on Myspace and YouTube.

=== 2013–2017: CrazySexyCool: The TLC Story, "Sausage", Take Me Back, and When Love Kills: The Falicia Blakely Story ===
In October 2013, Kirkland starred as Lisa "Left Eye" Lopes in the VH1 biographical film CrazySexyCool: The TLC Story, which aired on October 21, 2013, alongside Keke Palmer and Drew Sidora, who played Rozonda "Chilli" Thomas and Tionne "T-Boz" Watkins, respectively. The film generated 4.5 million views in one night. This was her first acting debut and breakout role, in which she received positive feedback from Lopes' fans. Kirkland was the first to be cast and from both the success of the film and the close relationship she formed with Watkins and Thomas. TLC took a chance on Kirkland, allowing her to substitute for Lopes. TLC took Kirkland on tour, and Kirkland carried out Lopes' legacy by rapping her verses. Kirkland's journey with TLC came to end after they performed at the 2013 American Music Awards. Kirkland and TLC dedicated a performance of "Waterfalls" to Lopes. After the tribute, Kirkland and TLC parted ways, and Kirkland went on to return to making music.

In November 2014, Kirkland and AV were featured on MC Lyte's song "Ball" from her album Legend. The music video was released on November 13, 2014. Kirkland appeared in the video with both artists, providing rap verses, along with some of her signature dance moves. That same year, she performed the song live with AV and MC Lyte on The Real.

In May 2015, Kirkland released the video for her song "Sausage" on WorldStarHipHop. The song was inspired by the #SausageMovement on Vine after Kirkland heard two girls on a street corner following the trend. The video incorporates many themes including Teenage Mutant Ninja Turtles, voguing, Mary J. Blige, Caribbean love, and community fun. It immediately went viral, with more than 3 million views in its first week, topping the Billboard + Twitter Top Tracks charts, passing Maroon 5's "Sugar" and knocking out Jason Derulo's "Want to Want Me". It held itself steady in the top 20 well into June, with numerous dance studio and dance jams featuring choreography and routines on social media danced to the track.

Kirkland got a chance to perform the song live during half time of the 2015 BET Hip Hop Awards. The track was not made available for sale, being absent from both iTunes and Amazon Music due to copyright issues; the track was only available on Kirkland's SoundCloud account and her website. The video also opted out of advertising revenue on YouTube, with no advertisements appearing before the music video. The following year, she released another single "Memes" as a response to memes made of her after her notorious interview on The Breakfast Club. Kirkland released Take Me Back, a mixtape which featured "Sausage" and "Memes". The mixtape was later up for sale on her website and SoundCloud account, it featured seven songs including a cover and re-edition of Rihanna's "Work". The song received mixed reviews online both on YouTube and her website. People were not fond of her vocals on the hook, but adored her choreography. The last song to be added was "Too Fly", which caught less attraction after her website was taken down for unknown reasons. The music video was filmed at a club featuring her younger brother Arnstar as one of the dancers. She also produced her singing vocals on the hook. The song was also another copyright issue that couldn't be made for sale and solely released through her mixtape and her SoundCloud account. The music video is a YouTube exclusive.

After her acting debut, Kirkland made what SOHH called an "epic comeback". Kirkland was back on red carpets, award shows, talk shows, and magazine covers. In 2016, Kirkland made an appearance on Hip Hop Squares as a contestant; the episode was highlighted because of the controversy Tamar Braxton started with the host. That same year, Kirkland, alongside Dej Loaf, gave a tribute to Lil' Kim at VH1's Hip Hop Honors, Lil' Kim later thanked Kirkland with a post of the tribute on her Instagram account.

In June 2015, Kirkland was listed as a featured speaker at an event sponsored by BET and the Hip Hop Sisters Network. Titled "Women, Wealth and Relationships", the event also featured guest speakers MC Lyte, Shanice, and Elise Neal, as well as main speaker and financial advisor specialist Lynn Richardson. The event, held on June 27, 2015, focuses on empowering black women both in their lives and financially, providing answers on such tough issues as men, money, and family relationships.

On August 28, 2017, Kirkland returned to acting, starring in the television film When Love Kills: The Falicia Blakely Story, based on a true story. It premiered to 1.6 million viewers, ranking as TV One's #1 original movie premiere of all time among all key demos. Kirkland, along with director Tasha Smith and her co-stars Tami Roman and Lance Gross, went on a tour to promote the film and share Falicia Blakely's story.

=== 2018–present: "Shoe Game" and Growing Up Hip Hop: Atlanta ===
On April 17, 2018, Kirkland became competitor on MTV's The Challenge: Champs vs. Stars, a competitive television miniseries in which celebrities would team up with pro-athlete champions against each other. There, she met Drake Bell, and the two would later go on to collaborate on his track "Call Me When You're Lonely".

On May 3, 2018, Kirkland released a single titled "Shoe Game". The single was available everywhere online for sale, streaming, and digital download. The single was later followed by a music video, directed by Walu, on May 25, 2018. It became a YouTube exclusive, following a million and twenty thousand views within five months. Kirkland went on to promote the single on the morning edition of Total Request Live in late September informing that this will lead to a future album. She was then followed up by Brynn Elliott after discussion of her old album and viewing of her greatest music videos which included "Lip Gloss", "Shawty Get Loose", and "G-Slide (Tour Bus)".

On September 9, 2018, Kirkland was a presenter for the 2018 BET special Black Girls Rock!; she had the privilege to work with artists such as Queen Latifah, Janet Jackson, Mary J. Blige, etc. She presented the award to Shanay Thompson for her M.A.D. Girls celebrated by Coca-Cola. On September 25, 2018, Entertainment Tonight announced that Kirkland would join the cast of The CW's All American as a supporting character; this would be her first acting role since When Love Kills: The Falicia Blakely Story.

On October 4, 2018, Kirkland appeared on TV One's morning talk show Sister Circle to discuss her latest single "Shoe Game", and her being cast on Growing Up Hip Hop: Atlanta. There, she stated that she will be joining the cast as a regular due to her move to Atlanta, Georgia, to work on her upcoming album that Bow Wow will be assisting to co-produce and allow the series to document her journey as well as her experiences. She also got to discuss her acting career, as well as her taking vocal lessons from R&B singer Kelly Price; her singing will debut on the intended album.

On October 18, 2018, Growing Up Hip Hop: Atlanta premiered for the continuation of its second season. Kirkland made her debut on the first episode alongside Kiyomi Leslie and Masika Kalysha as replacement for cast members who quit. Kirkland stars alongside her mentor and new manager MC Lyte. On November 14, 2018, Kirkland made her debut appearance on All American in its fifth episode. She introduced her character, Chynna Q, an upcoming hip-hop artist.

On June 13, 2019, she starred in the film All In, alongside Traci Braxton.

== Personal life ==
Kirkland's mother, Tara, died on December 15, 2007, following a four-year battle with breast cancer. Kirkland's music video for "Shawty Get Loose" was dedicated to her memory; the single won her a Teen Choice Award. Tara was featured in the intro and closing of Kirkland's music video for the single "Lip Gloss." Kirkland had taken over guardianship over her younger siblings along with the help of her family and older brothers. Kirkland has stated she and her mother had a close relationship and her mother relied on her for the help in raising her younger siblings.

Kirkland is the older sister of rapper and dancer Arnstar.

== Controversies ==
At the 2009 MTV Video Music Awards, Kirkland went onstage while Jay-Z and Alicia Keys performed "Empire State of Mind.” She later stated that she "would never ... try to disrespect Jay-Z or take a moment that someone has created and try to relive it. I'm too original for that and I respect him too much for that."

On August 11, 2011, Kirkland was a guest on The Breakfast Club. While on the air, tensions rose between her and fellow DJ Charlamagne tha God as they exchanged jabs, with Charlamagne bringing up her VMAs incident among other controversies. Two more DJs, Angela Yee and DJ Envy, chimed in, discussing her absence from music at the time. Kirkland broke down in tears when her mother's passing was brought up. Kirkland crying spawned numerous internet memes. Kirkland later returned to The Breakfast Club to explain why she cried, and the DJs and Kirkland exchanged apologies with one another.

On March 10, 2016, Kirkland was arrested for driving 38 mph in a 25 mph speed zone with a revoked license. The incident took place in Harlem at around 4 a.m. Officers conducted an investigation and Kirkland's driver's license was revoked. She went on to make a statement apologizing to her family, friends, and fans.

== Discography ==
Studio albums

- VYP (Voice of the Young People) (2008)

== Filmography ==
=== Film ===
Year	Title	Role	Notes
2013	CrazySexyCool: The TLC Story	Lisa "Left Eye" Lopes	TV movie
2016	Wild for the Night	Val	
2017	When Love Kills: The Falicia Blakely Story	Falicia Blakely	TV movie
2018	Petey in the Park: The Misunderstanding	Taliya	Short
2019	All In	Keema	
2020	True to the Game 2	Alia	
2021	Fruits of the Heart	Maya	
2021	True to the Game 3	Alia	
2021	Hip Hop Family Christmas	A the Rapper	TV movie
2023	Sisters	Tia	
2023	These Are My Brothers	Carmen	Short
2024	A Hip Hop Story	MC Ryte	
2026	Deb is Boss	Deb Antney	

=== Television ===
Year	Title	Role	Note
2005	The Drop	Herself	Episode: "Episode #3.7"
2007	Total Request Live	Herself	Episode: "June 4, 2007"
2007	Access Granted	Herself	Episode: "Lil Mama"
2007	What Perez Sez	Herself	Episode: "About the VMAs"
2007	Showtime at the Apollo	Herself	Episode: "Lil Mama"
2008–12	America's Best Dance Crew	Herself/Judge	Main Judge: Season 1–7
2009	America's Next Top Model	Herself	Episode: "Dance with Me"
2010	My Super Sweet 16	Herself	Episode: "Lil Mama"
2018	Hip Hop Squares	Herself/Contestant	Episode: "Lil Jon vs Lil Mama"
2018	The Challenge: Champs vs. Stars	Herself/Contestant	Contestant: Season 3
2018	Growing Up Hip Hop: Atlanta	Herself	Main Cast: Season 2b
2018	All American	Chynna Q	Recurring Cast: Season 1
2019	Growing Up Hip Hop: New York	Herself	Recurring Cast

== Awards and nominations ==
=== BET Awards ===
Year	Nominee / work	Award	Result
2008	Herself	Best Female Hip Hop Artist	Nominated
2009	Herself	Best Female Hip Hop Artist	Nominated

=== MTV Video Music Awards ===
Year	Nominee / work	Award	Result
2007	"Lip Gloss"	Monster Single of the Year	Nominated

=== MTV Asia Awards ===
Year	Nominee / work	Award	Result
2008	"Girlfriend (Remix)"	Best Hook Up	Nominated

=== Teen Choice Awards ===
Year	Nominee / work	Award	Result
2007	Herself	Choice Rap Artist	Nominated
2007	"Lip Gloss"	Choice Summer Song	Won
2008	"Shawty Get Loose"	Choice Music: Hook Up	Nominated
2008	"Shawty Get Loose"	Choice Rap/Hip-Hop Track	Won
2008	Herself – America's Best Dance Crew	Choice TV: Personality	Nominated

=== Vibe Awards ===
Year	Nominee / work	Award	Result
2007	"Lip Gloss"	Ringtone of the Year	Nominated

== See also ==
- List of people from Harlem
