= Shawty Get Loose =

2008 single by Lil Mama featuring Chris Brown and T-Pain

Single by Lil Mama featuring Chris Brown and T-Pain

from the album VYP (Voice of the Young People)
- Released: January 11, 2008
- Recorded: 2007
- Genre: Pop rap
- Length: 3:34
- Label: Jive Records
- Songwriters: Faheem Najm; Niatia Kirkland
- Producer: T-Pain

Lil Mama singles chronology
"G-Slide (Tour Bus)" (2007)	"Shawty Get Loose" (2008)	"What It Is (Strike a Pose)" (2008)

Chris Brown singles chronology
"With You" (2007)	"Shawty Get Loose" (2008)	"No Air" (2008)

T-Pain singles chronology
"Who the Fuck Is That?" (2007)	"Shawty Get Loose" (2008)	"The Boss" (2008)

"Shawty Get Loose" is the third single from American rapper Lil Mama's debut album, VYP (Voice of the Young People). The single is the remix version, where it features American singer Chris Brown singing the chorus, and fellow rapper T-Pain rapping on the second verse. In the original, T-Pain originally sings the chorus, while Lil Mama raps on the second verse. Instead of T-Pain using the Auto-Tune effect, Chris Brown uses it, like he did in his other collaboration with T-Pain, "Kiss Kiss".

== Composition ==
"Shawty Get Loose" is a pop/rap song, performed in the key of F minor with a tempo of 115 beats per minute.

== Critical response ==
Allmusic editor K. Ross Hoffman praised the song: "recording of some cute tykes requesting "Shawty Get Loose," the infectious lite-R&B/dance banger which saved her from one-hit-wonder status by going Top Ten in early 2008 (thanks in part to the presence of guaranteed chart-greasers T-Pain and Chris Brown) and it was highlighted. MSN Entertainment compared the song: "Shawty Get Loose" with Chris Brown and T-Pain treads similar sonic terrain as Brown's hit "Kiss Kiss." Adrienne Day praised the song by putting it in "Download This" list and noting: "But kids will dig smart, quick cuts like the Southern-fried snap of Shawty Get Loose, featuring Chris Brown, who adds the special to Mama's sauce." Caroline Sullivan wrote a positive description: "a duet with R&B pin-up Chris Brown, Shawty Get Loose, is uplifting to a fault." OMH Music wrote that: "surprisingly the tempo is maintained with T-Pain testing his production skills on Shawty Get Loose." Emilee Woods was positive: "she repeatedly proves her ability to recreate the radio friendly formula of "Lip Gloss" on tracks like "Shawty Get Loose" (...) "Shawty Get Loose" is already making waves internationally with its signature T-Pain production and Chris Brown on the Auto-Tune." Rolling Stone's Jason Gay wrote: "The rat-a-tat "Shawty Get Loose," co-starring fellow phenom Chris Brown and produced by T-Pain, will have Mama's acolytes bouncing around Hot Topic." Spin magazine recommended this song: "kinetic Chris Brown- and T-Pain-assisted TV dance-show theme "Shawty Get Loose" should also be on your hard drive." A more mixed review came from DJ Booth: "there’s Shawty Get Loose, a track featuring Lil Mama trying to squeeze a little more life out of the successful Chris Brown and T-Pain combination, with only decent results, mostly because it’s hard to figure out just which of her many personalities Lil Mama is inhabiting on Shawty."

== Music video ==
The video was filmed and directed by R. Malcolm Jones in Miami, Florida. There is a dedication to Tara Kirkland, Lil Mama's mother, who died on December 15, 2007, after a four-year battle with cancer.

The video is set to be futuristic as it is an imitation of Michael Jackson and Janet Jackson's 1995 "Scream" video. Moreover, Chris Brown imitates Michael Jackson's signature moves, and Lil' Mama saying, "Get it in control like Janet Jack..." in reference to Janet Jackson. The video also pays homage to TLC's "No Scrubs" (1999) and IMx's "Stay the Night" (1999). DJ Khaled makes a cameo appearance on one of the TV screens and another features a clip of anime, with a character similar in features to Monkey D. Luffy of One Piece. Also, at the beginning of the video, T-Pain uses the saying "Greatness + greatness = great greatness". The video also was featured during the 2008 ACC Basketball Tournament.

It premiered on BET's Access Granted on January 30, 2008. Lil Mama presented her video on BET's show 106 & Park on February 1, 2008. It debuted at number 10 and reached to number 1 in 8 days. It stayed at number 1 for 13 days, this is the longest a video has stayed at number one in 2008. However, it appeared at #87 on BET's Notarized: Top 100 Videos of 2008 list. The video was released on February 19 on iTunes.

VFX for the video were created by Baked FX, previously Baked Goods.

== Track listing ==
CD Single 1

1. "Shawty Get Loose" (Main Version) (featuring Chris Brown and T-Pain)
2. "Shawty Get Loose" (Squeaky Clean)

== Charts ==
=== Weekly charts ===
Chart (2008)	Peak position
Australia (ARIA)	41
Canada Hot 100 (Billboard)	38
Japan (Japan Hot 100)	31
New Zealand (Recorded Music NZ)	3
UK Singles (Official Charts)	57
US Billboard Hot 100	10
US Hot R&B/Hip-Hop Songs (Billboard)	43
US Latin Rhythm Airplay (Billboard)	22
US Hot Rap Songs (Billboard)	13
US Rhythmic Airplay (Billboard)	22
US Billboard Pop 100	15

=== Year-end charts ===
Chart (2008)	Position
New Zealand (RIANZ)	39

== Certifications ==
Region	Certification	Certified units/sales
New Zealand (RMNZ)	Gold	7,500^{*}
^{*} Sales figures based on certification alone.
