= Party Like a Rockstar =

Single by Shop Boyz

from the album Rockstar Mentality
- B-side: "They Like Me"
- Released: February 19, 2007 (US)
- Recorded: 2007
- Genre: Hip hop, rap rock
- Length: 4:13 (album version); 4:08 (short edit)
- Label: On Deck, Universal Motown
- Songwriters: Demetrius "Meany" Hardin; Rasheed "Sheed" Hightower; Jason Vories Pittman; Richard "Fat" Stephens; Brian D Ward; William Whedbee
- Producer: Jason "Pit" Pittman

Shop Boyz singles chronology
"Party Like a Rockstar" (2007)	"They Like Me" (2007)

Music video
- "Party Like a Rockstar" on YouTube

"Party Like a Rockstar" is a song by American hip-hop group Shop Boyz. It was released as their commercial debut single and also served as the lead single from their debut album Rockstar Mentality (2007). It reached huge success during mid-2007, namely in the United States, peaking in the top five of the Billboard Hot R&B/Hip-Hop Songs, Hot Rap Tracks, and Hot 100 charts. The song was nominated for Best Rap Performance by a Duo or Group at the 50th Grammy Awards.

For a time, "Party Like a Rockstar" was the most played rhythmic, and rap song in the United States, according to Radio & Records. In foreign countries, the song also gained airplay in the UK on BBC Radio 1, and was added to the B-List on its playlist.

== Music and lyrics ==
The rap rock song was produced by Jason “Pit” Pittman. Lyrically the song makes references to prominent rock music figures such as Marilyn Manson, The Osbournes, and Travis Barker.

== Music video ==
The music video for the song opens with a clip of the group performing doughnuts in a black 1968 Pontiac GTO. It then progresses to show the group performing at a crowded concert, with intercut clips of an actual R&B playing and clips of the group performing in a hotel room. Cristal Athena Steverson from VH1's Flavor Of Love, as well as LaLa Brown make cameo appearances in the video.

== Chart performance ==
"Party Like a Rockstar" was a mid-charting hit in the United States as an airplay-only single. Confusion ensued, however, when a similarly titled song by hip hop artist Freak Nasty (who had his own hit a years earlier with Da' Dip) titled "Do It Just Like a Rock Star", was erroneously listed in the American iTunes Store with the title "Party Like a Rockstar". This led to Freak Nasty's song, recorded in 2005, selling approximately 30,000 digital downloads even though his track was completely dissimilar. In the Billboard issue dated May 26, 2007, the Shop Boyz were at number 54 on the Hot 100 due to heavy airplay while Freak Nasty was number 56 due to strong sales. The following week, after the Shop Boyz had an official digital release of their single, "Party Like a Rockstar" shot to number two while Freak Nasty dropped completely off the chart. After its jump, "Party Like a Rockstar" managed to remain in the runner-up spot for a total of six weeks.

== Critical performance ==
Nathan Rabin of The A.V. Club stated that the song was "one of my favorite guilty pleasures of the past few years: 'Party Like A Rockstar' by Shop Boyz, a hip-hop group whose conception of the rock-star mentality—which not so coincidentally is also the name of its debut album—began and ended with smashing guitars, staying up late, and saying 'totally' or 'dude' every other sentence."

Amid accusations of Freak Nasty taking advantage of the popularity of the Shop Boyz song, he responded in Billboard magazine's letters to the editor, stating in part, "I expect any artist that's signed to a major to do far better than any independent artist. Unlike Shop Boyz, I don't have a video. I also don't have any radio play or marketing. They do. My song sounds totally different from theirs, and our names are distinctly different. So how can consumers be confused? I have much love and respect for Shop Boyz, and I would never do anything to block their shine."

== Remixes ==
The song was officially remixed featuring verses from fellow hip hop rappers Lil Wayne, Jim Jones and Chamillionaire, with more guitar riffs included. Jones' verse however does not appear on the official iTunes release of the remix. A line from Lil Wayne's verse in this remix was later used in The Game's 2011 single "Martians vs. Goblins", with Lil Wayne being officially credited as a feature on the Game's track.

An unofficial remix was produced by crunk music legend Lil Jon. Additionally, there were also "freestyles" recorded by hip hop rappers J. R. Writer of Dipset, Trina and Bow Wow.

== In media ==
The song was featured in the video game NBA Live 08. The song was featured in the US television series The Wire, "React Quotes". The song was covered by Kidz Bop, but also featured in the 13th album. The song will be available in Fortnite Festival starting on 30 January 2025

== Charts ==
=== Weekly charts ===
Weekly chart performance for "Party Like a Rockstar"
Chart (2007)	Peak position
Australia (ARIA)	81
Australian Urban (ARIA)	16
Canada Hot 100 (Billboard)	23
UK Singles (OCC)	151
US Billboard Hot 100	2
US Hot R&B/Hip-Hop Songs (Billboard)	3
US Pop Airplay (Billboard)	10
US Hot Rap Songs (Billboard)	1
US Rhythmic Airplay (Billboard)	1

=== Year-end charts ===
Year-end chart performance for "Party Like a Rockstar"
Chart (2007)	Position
US Billboard Hot 100	14
US Hot R&B/Hip-Hop Songs (Billboard)	27
US Rhythmic (Billboard)	10

== Certifications ==
Certifications for "Party Like a Rockstar"
Region	Certification	Certified units/sales
United States (RIAA) digital	Platinum	1,000,000^{*}
United States (RIAA) Mastertone	3× Platinum	3,000,000^{*}
^{*} Sales figures based on certification alone.
