= Shop Boyz =

American hip hop group

- Origin: Bankhead, Atlanta, Georgia, United States
- Genre: Hip hop
- Years active: 2004–15, 2020–present
- Labels: Still Shop Entertainment, LLC; TranScend Entertainment, LLC
- Members: Meany; Fat; Sheed

The Shop Boyz are an Atlanta-based rap group best known for their 2007 hit single "Party Like a Rockstar." The group is composed of Demetrius "Meany" Hardin, Richard "Fat" Stephens, Rasheed "Sheed" Hightower.

== Career ==
After signing with Universal Republic Records, Shop Boyz began to record their first album, Rockstar Mentality, which featured rock-influenced hip hop. The album's lead single, "Party Like a Rockstar," was released in May 2007 and achieved commercial success, reaching number two on the US Billboard Hot 100 (the #1 song on the Hot 100 at the time being Rihanna's "Umbrella") and becoming the highest-selling ringtone of 2007. Rockstar Mentality was released on June 19, 2007, debuting at number 11 on the US Billboard 200, which had sold 200,000 copies as of 2007. The follow-up single, "They Like Me", performed at number 98. The group was eventually released from Universal and moved to another label.

In August 2008, Shop Boyz released "Up Thru There" as the lead single from their second studio album.

== Discography ==
=== Studio albums ===
List of studio albums, with selected details and chart positions
| Title | Album details | Peak chart positions | | |
| Title | Album details | US | US R&B | US Rap |
|---|---|---|---|---|
| Rockstar Mentality | Release date: June 19, 2007; Label: Universal Motown | 11 | 4 | 2 |
| Gift and a Curse | Release date: March 14, 2015 | — | — | — |

=== Singles ===
List of singles, with selected chart positions and certifications
| Title | Year | Peak chart positions | | | | | | Certifications | Album |
| Title | Year | US | US R&B | US Rap | US Pop | AUS | CAN | Certifications | Album |
|---|---|---|---|---|---|---|---|---|---|
| "Party Like a Rockstar" | 2007 | 2 | 3 | 1 | 10 | 81 | 23 | RIAA: 3× Platinum (Mastertone)/Platinum (Digital) | Rockstar Mentality |
| "They Like Me" | 2007 | 98 | 111 | — | — | — | — | | Rockstar Mentality |
| "Up Thru There" | 2008 | — | 79 | — | — | — | — | | Non-album song |
"—" denotes releases that did not chart

== Awards and nominations ==
=== BET Hip Hop Awards ===
- 2007: Best Track: "Party Like a Rockstar" (Won)

=== Grammy Awards ===
- 2008: Best Rap Performance by Duo or Group: "Party Like a Rockstar" (Nominated)
