= Growing Up Hip Hop: Atlanta =

- Genre: Reality television
- Starring: Bow Wow; Zonnique Pullins; Reginae Carter; Shaniah Mauldin; Ayana Fite; Brandon Barnes; Deb Antney; Da Brat; Masika Kalysha; Kiyomi Leslie; Lil Mama; Waka Flocka Flame; Tammy Rivera; Diamond; Lelee Lyons
- Country of origin: United States
- Original language: English
- No. of seasons: 4
- No. of episodes: 48

Production
- Executive producers: Tara Long; Datari Turner; Mark Herwick; Ben Megargel; Dean W. Slotar; Gennifer Gardiner; Shad Moss; Shawntae Harris; Deb Antney; Angela Simmons
- Running time: 42 to 44 minutes
- Production companies: Datari Turner Entertainment; Entertainment One Studios

Original release
- Network: WE tv
- Release: May 25, 2017 – March 11, 2021

Related
- Growing Up Hip Hop; Growing Up Hip Hop: New York

Growing Up Hip Hop: Atlanta is the second installment of the Growing Up Hip Hop reality television franchise on WE tv. The series premiered on May 25, 2017, and chronicles the lives of the children of hip hop legends in Atlanta.

On September 29, 2020, the series was renewed for a 10-episode fourth season, which premiered on January 7, 2021.

== Cast ==
=== Main ===
Cast member	Seasons				
Cast member	1	2A	2B	3	4
Bow Wow	Main	Main	Main	Main	Main
Shaniah Mauldin	Main	Main	Main	Main	Main
Ayana Fite	Main	Main	Main	Main	Main
Brandon Barnes	Main	Main	Guest	Main	
Zonnique Pullins	Main	Main			
Reginae Carter	Main	Main			
Deb Antney	Supporting	Supporting	Main	Main	Main
Da Brat	Supporting	Supporting	Main	Main	Main
Masika Kalysha			Main		
Kiyomi Leslie			Main		
Lil Mama			Main		
Waka Flocka Flame				Main	Main
Tammy Rivera				Main	Main
Reemarkable				Main	Main
Buku				Main	Supporting
Diamond					Main
Lelee Lyons					Main

- Bow Wow (real name Shad Moss): Moss released his first album Beware of Dog in 2000 as Lil' Bow Wow at the age of 13 under the guidance of Snoop Dogg and Jermaine Dupri. He has released five other studio albums since his debut. Moss was the host of the music video countdown show 106 & Park from 2012 to 2014. Moss has acted in many movies and television shows including Like Mike and CSI: Cyber. The first season showcases Bow Wow returning to Atlanta to record his final studio album and reconnecting with his father.
- Shaniah Mauldin: daughter of Jermaine Dupri. During the second half of season 2, she reveals she wants to start a clothing line that her father does not take as serious.
- Ayana Fite: daughter of DJ Hurricane. In the first season, Ayana tries to become more serious with her girlfriend Amy. After working in retail for several years, she decided to start her own clothing line. Although the clothing line was successful, she ultimately decided that it was not her passion, and made the decision to not pursue it any further. She also takes a major step in introducing her father to her girlfriend Amy, as well as prep for a breast reduction surgery.
- Deb Antney (Seasons 2–4; supporting cast member in season 1): godmother of Brandon Barnes and mother of Waka Flocka Flame. Deb has developed the career of her son Waka along with French Montana, Gucci Mane and Nicki Minaj.
- Da Brat (Seasons 2–4; supporting cast member in season 1): the first female rapper to go platinum with her album Funkdafied on Jermaine Dupri's So So Def label. Da Brat is currently a part of The Rickey Smiley Morning Show and Dish Nation.
- Waka Flocka Flame (Seasons 3–4): son of Deb Antney
- Tammy Rivera (Seasons 3–4): Waka Flocka's wife
- Reemarkable (Seasons 3–4): daughter of Eazy-E
- Diamond (Season 4): member of Crime Mob and Pimpin's ex-girlfriend
- Lelee Lyons (Season 4): member of SWV
- Zonnique Pullins (Seasons 1–2): daughter of Tameka "Tiny" Cottle-Harris and stepdaughter of T.I. Pullins first came to public attention appearing in Tiny & Toya and later in T.I. & Tiny: The Family Hustle. Pullins was formerly a member of the OMG Girlz, who released the single "Gucci This (Gucci That)", which was nominated for an "NAACP Image Award" for Best New Artist. Pullins recently released her first solo EP titled Love Jones. In the first season, Zonnique attempts to take control of her music career by finding a new manager in Deb Antney.
- Reginae Carter (Seasons 1–2): daughter of Lil Wayne and Toya Wright. Carter has previously appeared in Tiny & Toya with her mother. Carter was a founding member of the OMG Girlz but left the group before any singles were released. Carter appeared on My Super Sweet 16 in 2015. In the first season, Reginae has a major conflict with Brandon when he disrespects her father.
- Brandon Barnes (Seasons 1–3): godson of Debra Antney. The first season showcases a major conflict between him and Reginae after he disrespects her father (Lil Wayne). During the first half of season 2, Brandon moved out of his Godmother Debra Antney's house after being confronted about all the disputes he drags her into.
- Masika Kalysha (Season 2): former video vixen and singer. She has a baby by rapper Fetty Wap and she was a former cast member of Love & Hip Hop: Hollywood.
- Kiyomi Leslie (Season 2): television personality, actress, singer, rapper, songwriter, model, and businesswoman
- Lil Mama (Season 2): former rapper, singer and actress. She has also ventured into acting, including her role as Lisa "Left Eye" Lopes in CrazySexyCool: The TLC Story. She later joined the cast of Growing Up Hip Hop: New York.
- Joann "Buku" Kelly (Season 3; supporting cast member in season 4): Daughter of R. Kelly and Drea Kelly

=== Supporting ===
Cast member	Seasons				
Cast member	1	2A	2B	3	4
Jermaine Dupri	Supporting	Supporting	Supporting	Supporting	Supporting
Toya Wright	Supporting	Supporting			
Tameka "Tiny" Harris	Supporting	Supporting			
DJ Hurricane	Supporting	Supporting	Supporting	Supporting	Supporting
Jhonni Blaze	Guest	Supporting	Supporting		Supporting
Teresa Caldwell	Guest	Guest	Supporting	Supporting	
Mona				Supporting	
Drea Kelly				Supporting	Supporting
BT			Guest	Supporting	Supporting
Angela Simmons				Supporting	Supporting
Pimpin'				Guest	Supporting
Jesseca Dupart					Supporting
Amy	Guest	Guest	Guest	Guest	Supporting
Khi Lyons					Supporting
Chevy				Guest	Supporting

- Jermaine Dupri: father of Shaniah Mauldin and the owner of the record label So So Def
- DJ Hurricane: father of Ayana Fite
- Jhonni Blaze (Seasons 2 & 4; guest star in season 1): former supporting cast member of Love & Hip Hop: New York
- Teresa Caldwell (Seasons 2–3; guest star in season 1): mother and former manager of Bow Wow
- Mona (Season 3): mother of Tammy Rivera
- Drea Kelly (Seasons 3–4): ex-wife of R. Kelly
- BT (Seasons 3–4; guest star in season 2): DJ at Streetz 94.5 and Bow Wow's friend
- Angela Simmons (Seasons 3–4): Bow Wow's ex-girlfriend and fiance. Daughter of Rev Run and former cast member of Growing Up Hip Hop.
- Pimpin' (Season 4; guest star in season 3): Bow Wow's friend
- Jesseca "Judy" Dupart (Season 4): Da Brat's girlfriend
- Amy (Season 4; guest star in seasons 1–3): Ayana's girlfriend
- Khiry "Khi" Lyons (Season 4): Lelee's son
- Chevy (Season 4; guest star in season 3): Reemarkable's boyfriend
- Toya Wright (Seasons 1–2): mother of Reginae Carter
- Tameka "Tiny" Harris (Seasons 1–2): mother of Zonnique Pullins and member of the R&B group Xscape

=== Guest ===
- $ir D Da Realist
- Joie Chavis
- MC Lyte
- Kelly Price
- Soulja Boy
- T-Boz
- Corri Moore
- LisaRaye
- Lil' Eazy-E

== Episodes ==
=== Series overview ===
Season	Episodes	Originally released	
Season	Episodes	First released	Last released
1	8	May 25, 2017	July 13, 2017
2	20	January 11, 2018	December 20, 2018
3	10	June 13, 2019	August 22, 2019
4	10	January 7, 2021	March 11, 2021

=== Season 1 (2017) ===
No. overall	No. in season	Title	Original release date	U.S. viewers (millions)
1	1	"Lil' Trouble in the A"	May 25, 2017	0.68
2	2	"You Don't Work with Rihanna"	June 1, 2017	0.45
3	3	"Bow Down to Your Mother"	June 8, 2017	0.59
4	4	"U Don't Know Me"	June 15, 2017	0.63
5	5	"Watch Me Flip, Watch Me Nae Nae"	June 22, 2017	0.67
6	6	"Problems and Sound is One"	June 29, 2017	0.66
7	7	"Pop's Locked...And Drops It"	July 6, 2017	0.61
8	8	"A-Town Goin' Down"	July 13, 2017	0.61

=== Season 2 (2018) ===
No. overall	No. in season	Title	Original release date	U.S. viewers (millions)
9	1	"Money Ain't a Thing"	January 11, 2018	0.54
10	2	"Secrets in the A"	January 18, 2018	0.41
11	3	"Rack It Up"	January 25, 2018	0.47
12	4	"Making Moves Like Whoa"	February 1, 2018	0.43
13	5	"Bow Caught in Jhonni's Blaze"	February 8, 2018	0.40
14	6	"The Young and the Wreckless"	February 15, 2018	0.62
15	7	"Guess Who's Back"	February 22, 2018	0.53
16	8	"Straight Outta Time"	March 1, 2018	0.47
17	9	"Can't Bow Out of This One"	March 8, 2018	0.42
18	10	"Drop the Mic"	March 15, 2018	0.40
19	11	"Welcome to the Wild Side"	October 11, 2018	0.44
20	12	"Ex and the City"	October 18, 2018	0.48
21	13	"Wild 'n Out"	October 25, 2018	0.52
22	14	"Too Lit to Quit"	November 1, 2018	0.49
23	15	"In My Feelings"	November 8, 2018	0.50
24	16	"Broken Heart"	November 15, 2018	0.44
25	17	"Trouble in Paradise"	November 29, 2018	0.43
26	18	"Relationship Goals"	December 6, 2018	0.53
27	19	"Hour of Chaos"	December 13, 2018	0.50
28	20	"No Ma'am, No Ham, No Turkey"	December 20, 2018	0.53

=== Season 3 (2019) ===
No. overall	No. in season	Title	Original release date	U.S. viewers (millions)
29	1	"Bow After Lockup"	June 13, 2019	0.51
30	2	"Sex, Lies & Surveillance Tape"	June 20, 2019	0.47
31	3	"Sex with You"	June 27, 2019	0.46
32	4	"R. Kelly Chaos"	July 11, 2019	0.28
33	5	"So So Triggered"	July 18, 2019	0.48
34	6	"Firestorm"	July 25, 2019	0.56
35	7	"It's Gettin Hot in Herre"	August 1, 2019	0.54
36	8	"No Ree-grets"	August 8, 2019	0.54
37	9	"Dangerous Liaisons"	August 15, 2019	0.59
38	10	"Smash Hit"	August 22, 2019	0.60

=== Season 4 (2021) ===
No. overall	No. in season	Title	Original release date	U.S. viewers (millions)
39	1	"Make Atlanta Great Again"	January 7, 2021	0.31
40	2	"Georgia Impeach"	January 14, 2021	0.32
41	3	"Word in the Streets"	January 21, 2021	0.33
42	4	"Fight For Your Life"	January 28, 2021	0.31
43	5	"The Battle of the OGs"	February 4, 2021	0.40
44	6	"Waka Weighs In"	February 11, 2021	0.30
45	7	"Guns Blazing"	February 18, 2021	0.39
46	8	"Call Security"	February 25, 2021	0.34
47	9	"Savage Love"	March 4, 2021	0.30
48	10	"Lil Bow Wow"	March 11, 2021	0.32

== Specials ==
Title	Original release date	U.S. viewers (millions)
"Bow in the Q"	June 25, 2020	N/A
