= Picciano (surname) =

Picciano is an Italian surname. Modern reference works describe it primarily as a habitational (toponymic) surname, taken from the place name Picciano, a comune in the province of Pescara (Abruzzo).

== Etymology and origin ==
Most English and Italian surname references that define Picciano connect it to the town of Picciano (Pescara, Abruzzo), meaning the name originally identified someone “from Picciano.”

Picciano is an official municipality in the province of Pescara, Abruzzo.

== Spelling and related surnames ==
Sources that list Italian surnames by etymology often group Picciano with closely related forms such as Picciani and Picciana, treating them as variants tied to the same place-name root. This follows Italian language grammar of pluraization and gender.

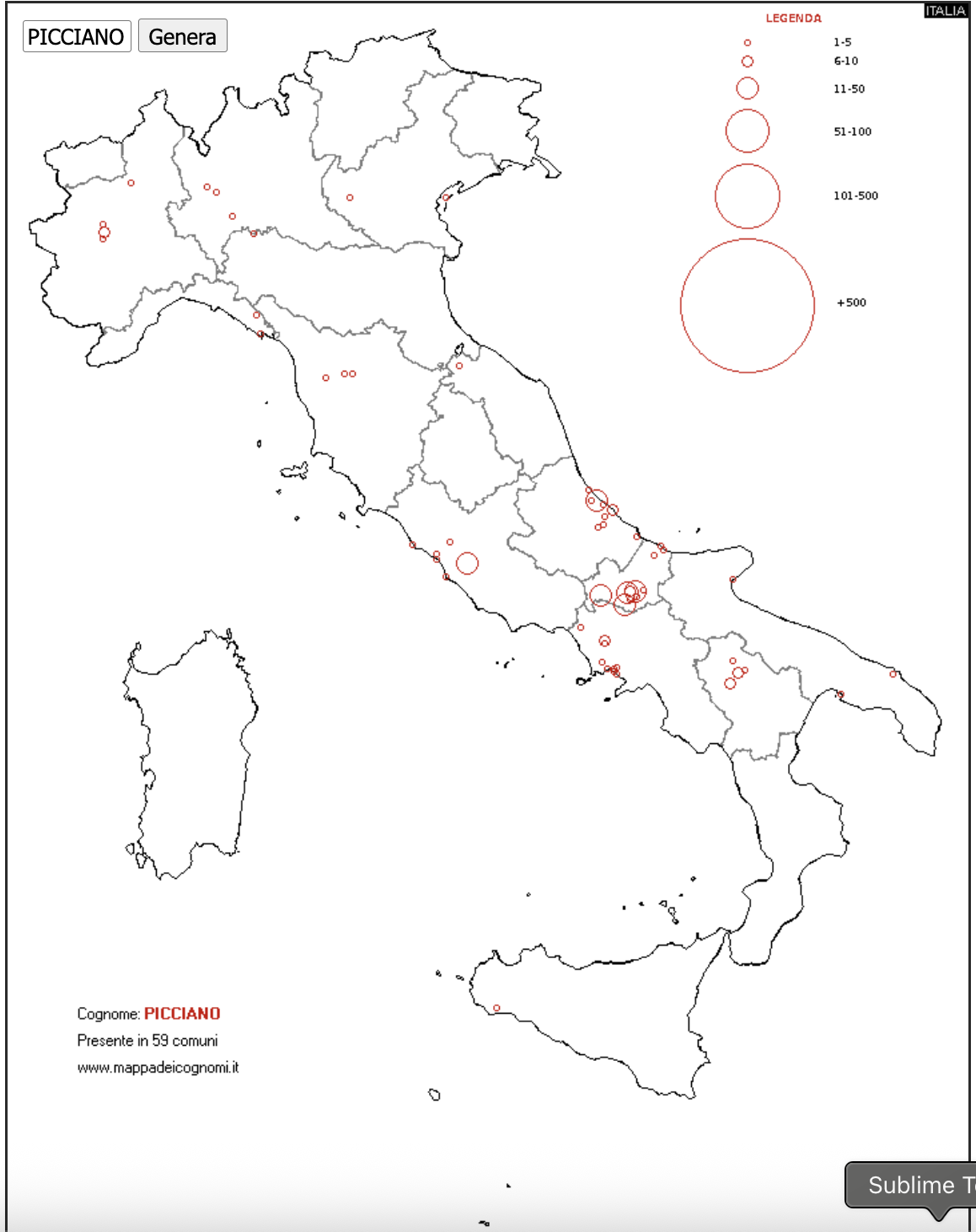
Picciano family distribution in Italy

== Geographic distribution ==
=== Italy ===
Because the surname is identified as habitational from a specific town in Pescara province, standard interpretation is that the surname's earliest concentration would be expected in or near Abruzzo the Pescara area.

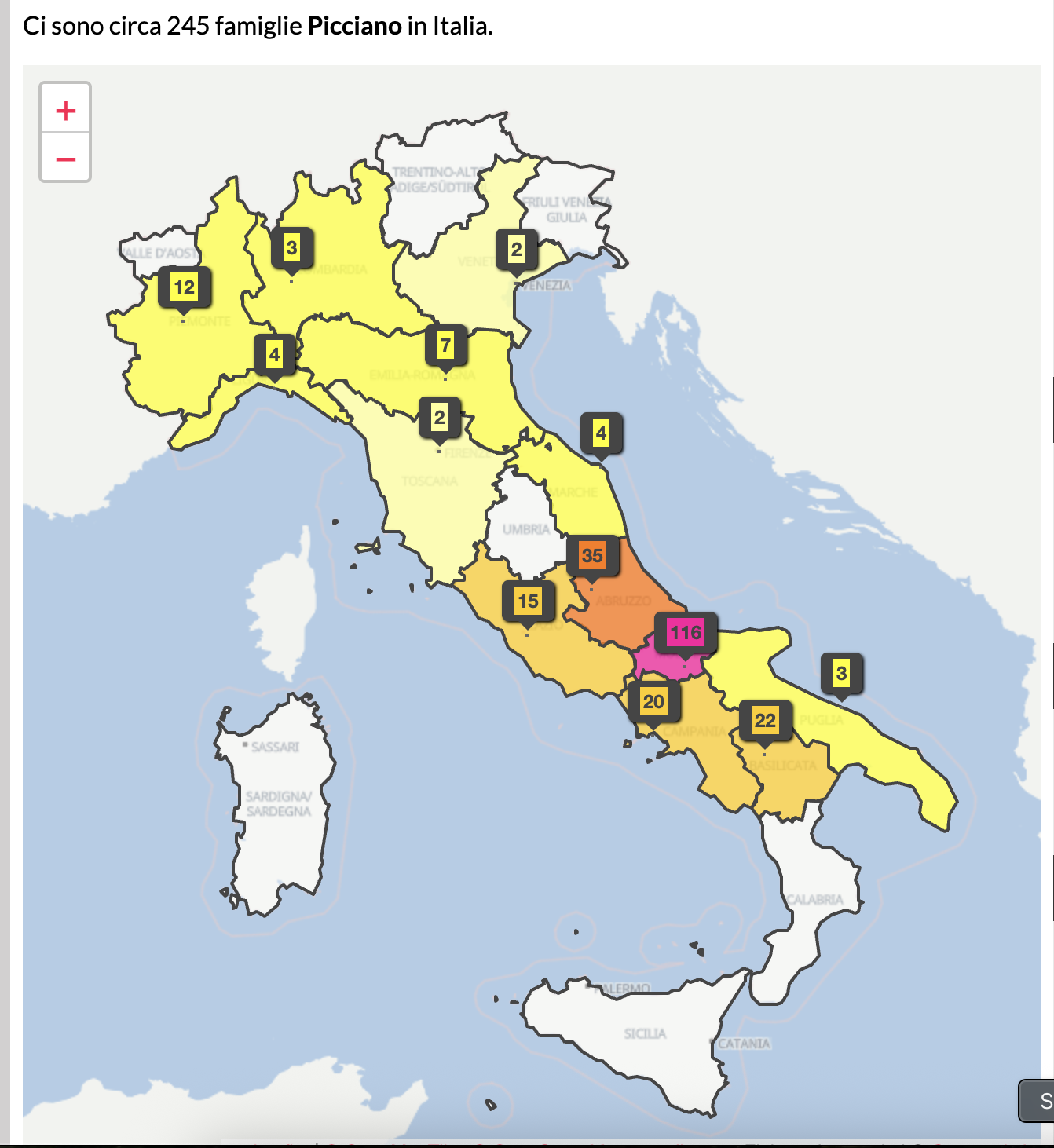
Picciano family in Italy

=== Americas ===
The Picciano surname can be found in use throughout the Americas. There are notable people bearing the last name, predominately in the United States. The general distribution is varied as the diaspora is spread through many different countries between North and South America, the largest concentrations seem to be Argentina, Brazil and the United States.

== Notable people ==
- Anthony Picciano
- Joe Picciano, former CEO of DirectBuy
- Thomas "Pooch" Picciano, MMA fighter
- Tom Picciano, musician, trumpet, clarinet, vocals in The Knewz
- Jorge Picciani
- Leonardo Picciani
- Rafael Picciani
- Picciano cast members from Staten Island Cakes

== Publications ==
The Picciano surname has appeared in at least one publicized work.

- Waiting Out a War: The Exile of Private John Picciano (1971) by Lucinda Franks
