= James DuBose =

American film producer (born 1969)

James L. DuBose
- Born: December 4, 1969 (age 56); Greensboro, North Carolina, U.S.
- Education: Wake Forest University (B.A.)
- Occupations: Founder and CEO, In The Black Network
- Years active: 1996–present
- Notable work: Fox Soul, One Mic Stand
- Television: Keyshia Cole: The Way It Is, Keyshia Cole: All In, The Michael Vick Project, Monica: Still Standing
- Relatives: Mary Ann DuBose (mother)
- Awards: Trailblazer, Sheen Magazine Awards
- Website: https://intheblacknetwork.tv/

James DuBose Jr (born December 4, 1969) is an American television producer, filmmaker, and entertainment-industry executive. He is widely recognized for his pioneering role as general manager and head of programming of Fox Soul for Fox Broadcasting Network. He is the founder of In The Black Network (ITBN), an advertising-based video on demand streaming network technically operated through Brightcove Inc.

== Early life and family ==
Born and raised in the Southern US city of Greensboro, North Carolina, during a turning point of the civil rights movement and throughout the pinnacle "desegregation and integration" era of Greensboro, He was raised as an only child by his mother, Mary Ann DuBose, a single parent who was employed at the local AMP plant.

== Education ==
DuBose attended Northeast Guilford Middle School before he transitioned to Northeast Guilford High School in McLeansville, North Carolina. He gained recognition as an elite athlete on both the football field and the basketball court. As a result, he received a full athletic football scholarship at Wake Forest University in Winston-Salem, North Carolina, with Communications as his focused major of study. DuBose was a major team player of WSU's college football roster, as a defensive end for the Wake Forest Demon Deacons. As a senior, he was co-captain of the 1989 Wake Forest Demon Deacons football team. On May 21, 1990, DuBose was officiated as a member of the Wake Forest University Graduating Class of 1990, presented with a Bachelor of Communications. He was later inducted as a pledged member of Omega Psi Phi fraternity.

== DuBose Entertainment ==
Before launching DuBose Entertainment, DuBose served as president of Sean 'P. Diddy' Combs' Bad Boy Television under the Bad Boy Worldwide Entertainment brand. DuBose is credited for his executive eye in captivating audiences while generating top-billing numbers.

In 2006, DuBose founded DuBose Entertainment. Within the first two years of operation, the Los Angeles production company had 45 employees. Projects under the DuBose Entertainment banner include ComicView: One Mic Stand with Kevin Hart, Keyshia Cole: The Way It Is, Monica: Still Standing, Tiny and Toya, Toya: A Family Affair, Trey Songz: My Moment, The Michael Vick Project, and Hell Date.

Efforts to form a music branch under the DuBose Entertainment banner led DuBose to join forces with rapper MC Lyte. On August 27, 2009, MC Lyte took to her blog to announce the merger. "There is no doubt that James DuBose is a prolific producer," she wrote, "who has become the go to guy for some of today's biggest names." Two years later, the pair signed dancehall reggae artist Beenie Man to the music label. That same year, R&B singer Tweet joined the growing artist roster of DuBose Music Group. In 2013, Tweet released a five-track EP, Simply Tweet, under the DuBose banner.

== Fox Soul ==
On January 13, 2020 DuBose led the official live-streamed launch of Fox Soul, a digital television network and streaming service operated by Fox Television Stations, audience-accessed through various digital streaming platforms including YouTube, YouTube TV, Fox Now, Samsung +, Roku, Tubi, Amazon Fire TV, The Web, Apple TV, Stirr, FuboTV, IOS, Android, Twitter, Facebook, and Instagram.

In May 2021, with a reported 44-million count of viewers, Fox Soul was green-lit to expand its Black culture-fuelled programming. With DuBose as head of programming, the streaming service successfully entered its second season. "The partnerships with black talent and creators that we have been able to forge to date, speaks [sic] volumes to how the community is feeling about us here at Fox Soul," DuBose told PR and mainstream media outlets.

On September 30, 2022 Deadline Hollywood published word of Fox Soul's further expansion with a return of original flagship series on the network including The Black Report, The Book of Sean (hosted by Rev. Dr. Sean H. McMillian), The Business of Being Black with Tammi Mac, Cocktails with the Queens (co-hosted by Claudia Jordan, Vivica A. Fox, LisaRaye McCoy and Syleena Johnson), and TEA G-I-F (co-hosted by Claudia Jordan, Al Reynolds and Funky Dineva aka Quentin Latham). "Fox Soul continues to expand on genres that we love, in a unique way. This fall, we are tapping further into music, sports and finance," said James DuBose, general manager and Head of Programming. "Fox Soul will continue to provide programming that tells the story behind the stories as we remain resolute in our mission to entertain, educate and inspire."

In February 2023 Fox Soul was recognized by the Biden White House as a game-changing network of choice trusted by 46th president of the United States of America Joe Biden. "The President was looking forward to an interview with Fox Soul to discuss the Super Bowl, the State of the Union, and critical issues impacting the everyday lives of Black Americans," read an announcement posted to the official Twitter account of 35th White House Press Secretary Karine Jean-Pierre, surrounding the widely publicized pre-Super Bowl 57 presidential interview. "We’ve been informed that Fox Corp has asked for the interview to be cancelled." Jean-Pierre's social media announcement was highlighted by all mainstream media outlets including ABC, CBS, NBC, and CNN. "The White House seeking out Fox Soul was seen as a way to have the president avoid appearing with a Fox News personality while still going through with an interview," wrote Politico California Bureau Chief Christopher Cadelago. "Biden’s team worked on landing an agreement with Fox Soul, a streaming outfit part of Fox's TV stations division and geared toward a Black audience. White House officials had arranged for the interview to be conducted by Fox Sports host Mike Hill and actress Vivica A. Fox. Fox Soul general manager James DuBose had planned to produce the interview. All three flew Friday from Los Angeles to Washington for the interview."

== In The Black Network (ITBN) ==
DuBose spent three years at Fox Soul, which launched in early 2020, before leaving in 2023 to set up ITBN.

On June 23, 2023 Deadline Hollywood announced that DuBose had founded in the Black Network, an advertisement-based video on demand streaming service "that highlights Black voices and original stories." "Since its inception in October 2023 by CEO James DuBose, In The Black Network TV (“ITBN") has aimed to become the leading platform for Black creators and diverse audiences," wrote Nickie E. Robinson for Madamenoire.com. "Its goal is to create a destination that highlights stories in a celebration of authenticity and unity." In an interview with the National Newspaper Publishers Association's Let It Be Known morning news show, DuBose described In The Black Network as "a cultural phenomenon set to house a rich tapestry of entertainment meticulously curated from the vault of Fox Television Stations."

Within six months of the initial launch, a music division was formed. On February 26, 2024, In The Black Music, a division of James DuBose's in the Black Network—in collaboration with the label Red Eye Lifestyle—released a ten-track album titled Game 7 by North Carolina hip-hop lyricist Joshua Gunn. DuBose and Gunn shared executive producer credits over the "Pay What You Want" marketed sound recording.

On March 22, 2024 Deadline Hollywood reported that Holly Davis Carter had announced her "family, faith and lifestyle-focused MergeTV would be launched and carried on ITBN. A social media campaign featured DuBose and Carter celebrating the newly established platform-partnership, aiming to present audiences with "elevated content, redeeming conversations and inspired entertainment" over INBN.

A 2024 article by RollingOut.com cited InTheBlackNetwork.tv's "community-driven" content of influential value creating a "cultural legacy". The author drew a comparison to similarly constructed yet seasoned networks including Kathy Hughes' TV One and Oprah Winfrey's OWN.

== Film ==
DuBose officiated his role as a film producer with the February 11, 2018 release of the Damon Dash-directed Lionsgate film Honor Up. According to the Los Angeles Times, "Damon Dash directed and stars in this crime drama about an OG trying to protect his family after a shootout in Harlem."

== Philanthropy ==
DuBose reportedly plans to launch a television production camp for children of low-income families.

During the COVID-19 pandemic, the James DuBose Scholarship Program was created as a charitable resource for qualified candidates to gain financial assistance for post-secondary study in the US across multiple disciplines.

== Awards and nominations ==
On September 8, 2022, DuBose was named a trailblazing figure at the Sheen Magazine Awards show. In a press release, the Black PR Wire published word of the event held in Atlanta, Georgia. Hosted by Dish Nation commentator Headkrack, the awards show was streamed live from the Sheraton Hotel Atlanta over the Fox Soul streaming network.

== Filmography ==
Year	Title	Network	Role
2024	Who's Cheating Who?	BET	Producer
2023	Whatever It Takes	BET Plus	Co-Executive Producer
2018	Dish Nation	Fox Television Networks	Executive producer
2018	Honor Up	Lionsgate	
2017	WAGS Atlanta	E! Networks, Comcast	Executive producer
2016	From The Bottom Up	BET Networks	Executive producer
2015	Keyshia Cole: All In	BET Networks	Executive producer
2014	Keyshia & Daniel: Family First	BET Networks	Executive producer
2014	Toya: A Family Affair	BET Networks	Executive producer
2013	ComicView 14	BET Networks, Viacom	Executive producer
2012	Keyshia Cole: The Way It Is	BET Networks	Executive producer
2010	Monica: Still Standing	BET NEtworks	Executive producer
2010	Tiny & Toya	BET Networks	Executive producer
2010	The Michael Vick Project	BET Networks	Executive producer
2009	Frankie & Neffe	BET Networks	Executive producer
2009	Inside DTP	BET Networks	Executive producer
2009	Trey Songz: My Moment	BET Networks	Executive producer
2008	One Mic Stand with Kevin Hart	BET Networks	Executive producer
2007	We Got to Do Better	BET Networks	Director
2005	Super Agent	Spike TV, Viacom	Executive producer
2005	Run's House	MTV, MTV2, BET	Producer
2005	P. Diddy Presents: The Bad Boys of Comedy	HBO, Time Warner	Executive producer
1999	Tarzan in Concert With Phil Collins	Time Warner	Producer
