= Monica: Still Standing =

- Starring: Monica; Melinda Dancil; Bryan Michael Cox; Rocko
- Opening theme: "Still Standing" by Monica
- Country of origin: United States
- No. of seasons: 1
- No. of episodes: 12

Production
- Executive producer: James DuBose
- Production locations: Atlanta, Georgia

Original release
- Network: BET
- Release: October 27, 2009 – January 19, 2010

Related
- Monica: The Single

Monica: Still Standing is an American reality television series from executive producer James DuBose, in conjunction with Jimmy Iovine. The series was first aired on BET October 27, 2009, plugged by the 2009 BET Hip Hop Awards. Production of the ten part docu-series was strategically developed to gear towards Monica making an official comeback after lengthy hiatus. The show focused on searching for a hit single for her fifth studio album release, while aiming to balance her life with father of her children and former fiancé Rocko da Don and recovery from a troubled past.

== Overview ==
It focused on searching for a hit single for her fifth studio album release and balancing her personal life of being a full-time mother and troubled past. The strategic planning of the special leading to her successful return to the limelight following a ten-year hiatus from the recording industry, Monica—whose real name is Monica Denise Arnold—credited consulting producer of episode one, Ryan Glover and executive producer of the project, James DuBose for helping to navigate the reemergence of her artistic career through the reality docu production of the BET broadcast; which led to both the 2009 DuBose Entertainment series and the 2009 Interscope Records album to be named: Monica: Still Standing"

"I have to be honest, I did not come up with the idea for the television show. I have to give credit to Ryan Glover and James DuBose that did "The Way It Is" for one of my good friends (Keyshia Cole)." – Monica

== Cast ==
=== Main cast ===
- Monica – R&B singer
- Melinda Dancil – Monica's cousin and manager
- Bryan Michael Cox – songwriter and record producer

=== Guest stars ===
- Rocko Da Don
- Jermaine Dupri
- Kendrick "WyldCard" Dean
- Polow Da Don
- Timbaland
- Dallas Austin
- Soulja Boy Tell 'Em

== Production ==
While searching for a hit single for her sixth studio album release, the singer balances her personal life of being a full-time mother and troubled past. The show was a spin-off to the one-hour reality special television show Monica: The Single on Atlanta's Peachtree TV on August 5, 2008. The series was later picked up by BET the following week. The show premiered on October 27, 2009, directly after the 2009 BET Hip Hop Awards. The series runs all-new episodes every Tuesday at 10 pm and 10:30 pm EST. The show has appearances by Bryan Michael Cox and Kendrick "WYLDCARD" Dean. Also stars Monica's trainer Carlos and her cousin Melinda.

== Episodes ==
| No. | Title | Original release date |
|---|---|---|
| 1 | "Still Standing" | October 27, 2009 |
In our premiere episode, Monica takes us on her journey as an artist, back to where it all began in Atlanta, Georgia. We learn about her years as a singing child star and the trials and tribulations she experienced as a young woman. Now, Monica is working on her fifth studio album and the future of her music career at J Records is riding on its success. While she's working hard with producers to find a single, and setting up a meeting with her record label, Monica is also managing a busy family life. She's excited about moving into a brand new home, but for now she's living in the Presidential Suite at InterContinental Buckhead Atlanta hotel because the house is still under construction.
| 2 | "Angel of Mine" | November 3, 2009 |
Monica travels to Birmingham with her family (her two sons, mom and Melinda) to sing at a small club called Platinum. Monica's fans are extremely important to her and this show is a great way to connect with them. During a sold-out performance, Monica is reminded why she sings.
| 3 | "Love All Over Me" | November 10, 2009 |
Monica meets with Ne-Yo's manager, Tango, to hear new music for the album. After listening to a number of songs, a debate ensues over which song is right for Monica after a four-year hiatus from the music industry. Is this the day Monica finds another great single for the album?
| 4 | "Why I Love You So Much" | November 17, 2009 |
The news from Monica's doctor inspires her to take immediate control of her health. Monica meets with her favorite chef and trainer at the gym to create a daily regimen. Monica wants to do more than look great; she wants to feel great for all of the promotion related to the album….and for her family. The question is, will she stick to the plan? Afterward, Monica goes to the studio to finish working on the song, "Infiniti." During the session, Jazze Pha calls to get her thoughts on the song he pitched. Though Monica doesn't feel that the song is for her, she agrees to listen to it some more before she gives him a final answer.
| 5 | "For You I Will" | November 24, 2009 |
Monica is up early so she can spend some time with her mom before making a public appearance at Atlanta's Car & Bike Show. Monica is determined to make her new album a reflection of who she is now as an artist. She and Melinda meet with B. Cox one last time to discuss song selection before the big label meeting.
| 6 | "Everything to Me" | December 1, 2009 |
It's 4 days before the big meeting with the label in NYC, so Monica meets with B. Cox to finish putting the final touches on the songs she's recorded for the album. Melinda has the managing business down to a tee – handling everything from Monica's busy schedule to interior decorating. Realizing that she may need to seek more balance in her personal life, she meets with an old romance who gives her advice on why she's still single.
| 7 | "Don't Take It Personal" | December 8, 2009 |
On her day off, Monica checks on the status of her new house with Melinda. Later, Monica visits the Atlanta Children's Hospital in an effort to help kids who have asthma like her son, Romello. Monica is determined to make her new album a reflection of who she is now as an artist. She heads into the studio to work with Missy Elliott's producer, Lamb. Later, Monica has a pre-listening party with her industry confidants to get critical feedback and to prepare for the meeting with J Records in New York.
| 8 | "Let Me Know" | December 15, 2009 |
Monica and Melinda are in New York for a meeting with J Records about the single. Monica fights for one of her favorite two songs to be named the album's single, but J Records decides that neither song makes the cut
| 9 | "Before You Walk Out of My Life" | December 29, 2009 |
In a surprising turn of events, both of the songs Monica hoped would be contenders for her first single were rejected by the label. Back to square one, again. Always determined and driven, Monica steps up her search for the ever-elusive single. The release of her album depends on it.
| 10 | "Breaks My Heart" | January 5, 2010 |
In a stepped up effort to make a single that the label will approve, Monica, Melinda and their new assistant Tara travel to Los Angeles to get in the studio with Polow Da Don. Not only is he a bona fide super-producer, but he is also Monica's cousin, and tempers flare when they debate the subject of monogamy and fidelity in male/female relationships. Timbaland makes a surprise appearance and gives Monica some great insight on her album project.
| 11 | "Superman" | January 12, 2010 |
On Monica's 29th birthday, she and her work crew travel by bus to Tallahassee, Florida to perform a FAMU Homecoming concert. Before the concert, Monica has an impromptu ‘open forum’ with 30 young women from FAMU's School of Business. Monica opens herself to no-holds-barred questions from the women and shares some of her struggles and obstacles with them.
| 12 | "Still Standing: Reprise" | January 19, 2010 |
Monica and the crew are back in NY for some serious business. Along with her meeting with Larry Jackson to play the new potential singles, Monica has a ton of press and promotion to do for her upcoming album. She appears on "106 & Park," the D.L. Hughley radio show, and does numerous other interviews in a whirlwind of activity.

== Ratings ==
The premiere and encore episode garnered 3.2 million total viewers. The James DuBose production was made the second highest series debut in BET history behind the debut of DuBose Entertainment's Tiny & Toya. The show was given a "B" by Entertainment Weekly.
