= Fox Soul =

Digital television network

- Company type: Division
- Website type: Entertainment, streaming
- Available in: English
- Headquarters: New York City, {{{location_country}}}
- Owner: Fox Corporation
- Parent: Fox Television Stations
- Website: www.foxsoul.tv
- Registration: Optional
- Launched: January 13, 2020; 6 years ago
- Current status: Active

Fox Soul is a digital television network and live streaming service operated by Fox Corporation that launched on January 13, 2020. Named after soul music, the network focuses on two demographics: the African American experience and Christian media.

Featuring original and syndicated programs including The Sharpton Sisters, Brutally Honest with Jasmine Brand, Crockett's Corner, Cocktails with Queens, The Book of Sean and The Business of Being Black with Tammi Mac. The network also includes programs about the achievements of past and present African Americans, for instance The Uprising series.

Fox Soul is the first streaming service launched by Fox Television Stations and Fox Entertainment; prior to the acquisition of 21st Century Fox by the Walt Disney Company Fox had another faith-based studio called Fox Faith. It is accessed by audiences across various digital streaming platforms including YouTube, YouTube TV, Hulu + Live TV, FOX Now, Samsung +, Roku, Tubi, Amazon Fire TV, The Web, Apple TV, Stirr, FuboTV, iOS, Android, Twitter, Facebook, Instagram and DirecTV channel 4401.

== History ==
In May 2021, with a reported 44-million count of viewers, FOX Soul was greenlit to expand its Black culture-fueled programming. With James DuBose holding the seat of Head of Programming, the streaming service entered into its second season.

On September 30, 2022, Deadline Hollywood published word of FOX Soul's further expansion with a return of original FOX Soul flagship series on the network including The Black Report, The Book of Sean (hosted by Rev. Dr. Sean H. McMillian), The Business of Being Black with Tammi Mac, Cocktails with the Queens (co-hosted by Claudia Jordan, Vivica A. Fox, LisaRaye McCoy and Syleena Johnson), TEA-G-I-F (co-hosted by Claudia Jordan, Al Reynolds and Funky Dineva aka Quentin Latham).

== Original programming ==
- One on One with Keyshia Cole — Hosted by Keyshia Cole
- The Book of Sean — Hosted by Dr. Sean McMillan
- Choppin’ It Up with Mike and Donny — Hosts: Mike Hill and Donny Harrell
- The Tammi Mac Late Show — Host: Tammi Mac
- Turnt Out With Ts Madison - Host: Ts Madison
- Out Loud with Claudia Jordan — Hosted by Claudia Jordan
- Fox Soul’s Screening Room — Hosted by Vivica A. Fox
- Fox Soul’s Black Report
- Tea-G-I-F - Hosted by Claudia Jordan, Funky Dineva (left December 2023), Armon Wiggins (replaced Funky Dineva), and Al Reynolds
- Fox Soul Deals
- Chatter
- Cocktails With Queens - Hosted by Claudia Jordan, LisaRaye, Vivica A. Fox, and Syleena Johnson
- Hollywood Unlocked With Jason Lee Uncensored
- The Mix
- Kingz With Kosine
- Worth A Conversation with Jay "Jeezy" Jenkins — Hosted by Jeezy
- Quarantine Cook-Off with Rickey Smiley — Host: Rickey Smiley
- Established with Angela Yee — Hosted by Angela Yee
- Get Into It With Tami Roman — Hosted by Tami Roman
- Love In Black with Tory and Teri- Hosted by Tory Smith and Teri Smith
- A7FL Games of the Week — Hosted by A7FL

== Fox Television Stations syndicated programming ==
- Dish Nation – syndicated entertainment news show
- The Real
- Street Soldiers with Lisa Evers – Community issues and music news from WNYW/New York, hosted by Lisa Evers
- Later with Leon – Comedic view of the news airing in late night on WFLD/Chicago, hosted by Leon Rogers
- The Feed At Night – Pop culture, comedy and news airing in late night on WTXF/Philadelphia, hosted by Alex Holley and Thomas Drayton
- Isiah Factor: Uncensored – Late night news and pop culture show on KRIV/Houston, hosted by Isiah Carey
- Divorce Court
