= Toya Johnson =

American reality television personality (born 1983)

Toya Johnson-Rushing
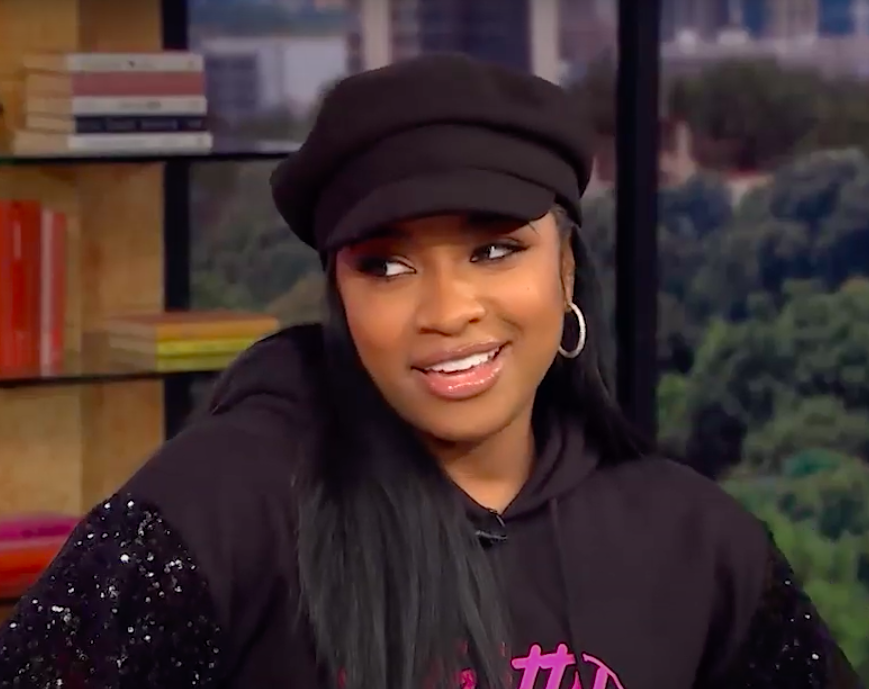
- Johnson-Rushing in 2020
- Born: Antonia Johnson; October 26, 1983 (age 42); New Orleans, Louisiana, U.S.
- Other names: Toya Carter; Toya Wright
- Occupation: Television personality
- Years active: 2004–present
- Spouses: Lil Wayne (m. 2004; div. 2006) Memphitz Wright (m. 2011; div. 2016) Robert Rushing (m. 2022)
- Children: 2
- Musical career
- Genres: R&B; hip-hop
- Instrument: Vocals
- Label: Def Jam Recordings

Antonia "Toya" Johnson-Rushing (née Johnson; born October 26, 1983) is an American reality television personality.

== Early life ==
Johnson was born in New Orleans, Louisiana. She is the second child of Anita Johnson and Walter Andrews.

== Career ==
In 2009, Johnson and Tameka "Tiny" Harris from the R&B group Xscape (also wife of rapper T.I.) starred on a reality show on BET called Tiny and Toya.

She wrote a book called Priceless Inspirations, as well a memoir titled In My Own Words..My Real Reality, How to Lose a Husband, and You Just Don't Get It with her daughter, Reginae Carter. She owns a boutique called G.A.R.B. in New Orleans, Louisiana, and GARB Shoetique in Smyrna, Georgia. Johnson starred in her own reality show on BET called Toya: A Family Affair which consisted of 16 episodes of one season in 2011.

== Personal life ==
At age 14, Johnson and rapper Lil Wayne met when she was at a corner store and Wayne was standing outside in New Orleans, Louisiana. She later became pregnant with their daughter. Lil Wayne was already signed to Cash Money Records as a burgeoning rapper. He ultimately chose to pursue his rap career with Cash Money Records in order to support his child. When she was 15 and Lil Wayne was 16, Johnson gave birth to their daughter in November 1998. Years later, upon Lil Wayne achieving stardom, they were married on February 14, 2004. In January 2006, however, after almost two years of marriage, the couple separated, citing her inability to cope with his lifestyle, most specifically his career keeping him away from home for long periods of time. Despite being divorced, the two have remained good friends and continued to raise their daughter together.

On June 18, 2011, Johnson and Memphitz Wright were married in Atlanta. The wedding guest list included rapper Rasheeda, Tameka Harris, Kandi Burruss, Nivea, Lauren London, Monica Brown, and Tamar Braxton. Kelly Price and Lloyd sang at the wedding. In February 2015, Johnson confirmed that she and Wright had separated after almost four years of marriage.

On July 31, 2016, Johnson's brothers Josh and Rudy were shot in New Orleans while inside of their car.

On February 8, 2018, Johnson gave birth to girl whose father is Robert "Red" Rushing. Johnson and Rushing married on October 15, 2022, in Cabo San Lucas.

== Filmography ==
Television
Year	Title	Role	Notes
2009–2010	Tiny and Toya	Herself	Main cast
2011	Toya: A Family Affair	Herself	Main cast
2014	My Super Sweet 16	Herself	Main cast
2016	Marriage Boot Camp: Reality Stars	Herself	Main cast
2017–2018	Growing Up Hip Hop: Atlanta	Herself	Supporting cast
2018–2020	T.I. & Tiny: Friends & Family Hustle	Herself	Main cast
2023–present	Toya & Reginae	Herself	Main cast
