= Growing Up Hip Hop: New York =

- Genre: Reality television
- Starring: Jeffrey Atkins, Jr.; Brittney Atkins; Da'Zyna Drayton; Young Dirty Bastard; Ryan Cartagena; Vina Love; Angie Pearson; JJ Lorenzo; Siaani Love; JoJo Simmons
- Country of origin: United States
- Original language: English
- No. of seasons: 1
- No. of episodes: 13

Production
- Executive producers: Tara Long; Datari Turner; Mark Herwick; Ben Megargel; Dean W. Slotar; Gennifer Gardiner; Kim Osorio; Jeffrey Atkins; Irving Lorenzo; Young Dirty Bastard; Da'Zyna Drayton; Jeffrey Atkins, Jr.; Jojo Simmons; Tanice Amira; JJ Lorenzo
- Running time: 42 to 44 minutes
- Production companies: Datari Turner Entertainment; Entertainment One Studios

Original release
- Network: WE tv
- Release: August 29 – November 21, 2019

Related
- Growing Up Hip Hop; Growing Up Hip Hop: Atlanta

Growing Up Hip Hop: New York is the third installment of the Growing Up Hip Hop reality television franchise on WE tv. The series premiered on August 29, 2019, and chronicles the lives of the children of hip hop legends in New York City.

== Cast ==
=== Main ===
- Jeffrey Atkins, Jr., Ja Rule's son
- Brittney Atkins, Ja Rule's daughter
- Da'Zyna Drayton, Flavor Flav's daughter
- Young Dirty Bastard, Ol' Dirty Bastard's son
- Ryan Cartagena, Fat Joe's son
- Vina Love, Kid Capri's daughter
- Angie Pearson, Irv Gotti's daughter
- JJ Lorenzo, Irv Gotti's son
- Siaani Love, Charli Baltimore's daughter
- JoJo Simmons, Rev Run's son

=== Recurring ===
- Ja Rule
- Irv Gotti
- Fat Joe
- Flavor Flav
- Kid Capri
- Charli Baltimore
- Quan, Flavor Flav's son
- Will, Flavor Flav's son
- Lil Mama
- Madina Milana, talent manager
- Taniqua, Ol' Dirty Bastard's daughter
- Angela Simmons, Rev Run's daughter
- Arnstar, Lil Mama's brother
- Deb, Irv Gotti's ex-wife

=== Guests ===
- Vanessa Simmons
- Tanice Amira
- Lil' Eazy-E
- Aisha Atkins

== Episodes ==
No.	Title	Original release date	U.S. viewers (millions)
1	"Face the Fyre"	August 29, 2019	0.32
2	"Lil Mama Drama"	September 5, 2019	0.32
3	"Have Your Cake & Eat It Too"	September 12, 2019	0.37
4	"Flavor of Love"	September 19, 2019	0.36
5	"Keeping It Real"	September 26, 2019	0.38
6	"Kissing Cousins"	October 3, 2019	0.29
7	"JoJo's Arrest"	October 10, 2019	0.33
8	"Free JoJo"	October 17, 2019	0.36
9	"Infidelity Exposed"	October 24, 2019	0.28
10	"F*** Is Up"	October 31, 2019	0.41
11	"Coming to Blows"	November 7, 2019	0.37
12	"Seize the Cameras!"	November 14, 2019	0.31
13	"Murder Inc for Life"	November 21, 2019	0.34
