= Everyday Elegance with Colin Cowie =

- Created by: Colin Cowie
- Starring: Colin Cowie
- Country of origin: United States
- Original language: English

Production
- Executive producer: Colin Cowie

Original release
- Network: We TV
- Release: 1999 – 2003

Everyday Elegance with Colin Cowie is an American lifestyle television program hosted by Colin Cowie.

The series ran for five seasons.

== Overview ==
Television program hosted by lifestyle guru and party planner Colin Cowie about ideas on home entertaining, decorating, cooking and style.
