= Colin Cowie =

American lifestyle advisor, author and interior designer (born 1962)

- Born: Colin Andrew Wilkie Cowie; 3 January 1962 (age 63); Kitwe, Federation of Rhodesia and Nyasaland
- Occupation(s): Entrepreneur, television personality, author
- Website: colincowie.com

Colin Andrew Wilkie Cowie (born 3 January 1962) is a Northern Rhodesia-born American lifestyle advisor, author, interior designer and party planner.

== Biography ==
Cowie was born in Kitwe, Northern Rhodesia (now Zambia), and educated in East London, South Africa. He moved to the United States in 1985 and founded Colin Cowie Lifestyle, a wedding planning agency, in 1992.

His media appearances include the Today Show, The Oprah Winfrey Show and The Ellen DeGeneres Show. He spent seven years on the Home Shopping Network and was a contributing member to the CBS Early Show for eight years. Cowie hosted the daily wedding planning show Get Married on Liefetime, on which he advised brides-to-be on fashion, decorating, and other wedding-related topics. He also hosted the television series Everyday Elegance with Colin Cowie for five seasons.

In March 2017, Cowie launched Wilkieblog.com. Two months later, Colin Cowie Lifestyle announced the launch of a catering venture, F.O.O.D. Inc..
