= Growing Up Hip Hop =

Reality television series

- Genre: Reality television
- Starring: Romeo Miller; Angela Simmons; Kristinia DeBarge; Boogie Dash; Egypt Criss; TJ Mizell; Vanessa Simmons; Briana Latrise; Tahira "Tee Tee" Francis; Jojo Simmons; Savannah Jordan; Cree Campbell; Sammattick; Layzie Bone; Sakoya Wynter; Lil Twist; Tyran Denton; Shawn Rogers; Lil Eazy E; Bow Wow
- Country of origin: United States
- Original language: English
- No. of seasons: 7
- No. of episodes: 106

Production
- Executive producers: Tara Long; Datari Turner; Mark Herwick; Gennifer Gardiner; Jeff Morayniss; Romeo Miller; Master P; Angela Simmons; Sandra "Pepa" Denton; Damon "Dame" Dash; Oji Singletary; Mala Chapple; Kate Farrell; Suzanne Gladstone; Bow Wow; Jojo Simmons; Steven Jordan; Sam "Sammattick" Wright; Boogie Dash; Egypt Criss; Luther Campbell; Layzie Bone; Briana Latrise; Cedric "K-Ci" Hailey; Joel "JoJo" Hailey; Treach
- Running time: 42 to 44 minutes
- Production companies: Datari Turner Entertainment; Entertainment One Studios

Original release
- Network: WE tv
- Release: January 7, 2016 – March 9, 2023

Related
- Growing Up Hip Hop: Atlanta; Growing Up Hip Hop: New York

Growing Up Hip Hop is the original installment of the Growing Up Hip Hop reality television franchise on WE tv. The series premiered on January 7, 2016, and chronicles the lives of the children of hip hop legends. Its success has led to the creation of spin-offs Growing Up Hip Hop: Atlanta and Growing Up Hip Hop: New York. The series is executive produced by Datari Turner Productions and Entertainment One Studios.

== Cast ==
=== Main ===
| Cast member | Seasons | | | | | | |
| Cast member | 1 | 2 | 3 | 4 | 5 | 6 | 7 |
|---|---|---|---|---|---|---|---|
| Romeo Miller | Main | Main | Main | Main | Main | | Main |
| Angela Simmons | Main | Main | Main | Main | Main | Main | Main |
| Kristinia DeBarge | Main | Main | Main | Main | | | |
| Boogie Dash | Main | Main | Main | Main | Main | Main | |
| Egypt Criss | Main | Main | Main | Main | Main | Main | Main |
| TJ Mizell | Main | Main | Supporting | | | | |
| Vanessa Simmons | Guest | Supporting | Main | Main | Main | Main | Main |
| Briana Latrise | | Supporting | Supporting | Main | Main | Main | Main |
| Tahira "Tee Tee" Francis | | | Supporting | Main | Main | Main | Main |
| Jojo Simmons | | | | Supporting | Main | Main | Main |
| Savannah Jordan | | | | | | Main | |
| Cree Campbell | | | | | | Main | Main |
| Sammattick | | | | Supporting | Supporting | Supporting | Main |
| Layzie Bone | | | | | | Supporting | Main |
| Sakoya Wynter | | | | | | Supporting | Main |
| Lil Twist | | | | Supporting | Supporting | Supporting | Main |
| Tyran Denton | | | | Supporting | Supporting | Supporting | Main |
| Shawn Rogers | | | | | Supporting | Supporting | Main |
| Lil Eazy E | | | | Supporting | Supporting | Supporting | Main |
| Bow Wow | | | Supporting | Supporting | Supporting | | Main |

- Romeo Miller (Seasons 1–5, 7): son of Master P and brother of Cymphonique Miller. Miller's career began with the release of his debut studio album Lil' Romeo at the age of 11, which led to other opportunities including his own Nickelodeon sitcom, Romeo!. Miller appeared on Dancing with the Stars during its twelfth season. In 2016, Miller appeared on Empire during its third season as Gram. The series chronicles his business ventures with his father. He broke up with Angela, his ex-fiance, in the fifth season.
- Angela Simmons: daughter of Rev Run of Run-DMC Simmons first gained attention when she appeared with her family on the reality television series Run's House. She has made a name for herself creating a clothing line.
- Egypt Criss: daughter of Pepa of Salt-N-Pepa and Treach of Naughty by Nature and wife of Sammattick. Criss has the desire to create a name for herself musically.
- Vanessa Simmons (Seasons 3–7; supporting cast member in season 2; guest star in season 1): Angela Simmons' sister. Simmons first gained public attention when she appeared with her family on the reality television series Run's House.
- Briana Latrise (Seasons 4–7; supporting cast member in seasons 2–3): daughter of Kendu Isaacs. In the second season, Briana deals with an abusive relationship. The third season chronicles the fallout from the breakup of her father and Mary J. Blige. She is Boogie's ex, and Lil' Eazy-E's love interest.
- Tahira "Tee Tee" Francis-Rogers (Seasons 4–7; supporting cast member in season 3): niece of Pepa. In the third season, Tee Tee goes to LA to watch over Egypt as Pepa goes on tour again.
- Jojo Simmons (Seasons 5–7; supporting cast member in season 4): Vanessa and Angela's brother. Jojo later joined the cast of Growing Up Hip Hop: New York along with his father.
- Cree Campbell (Seasons 6–7): daughter of Uncle Luke
- Sammattick (Season 7; supporting cast member in seasons 3–6): Egypt Criss' husband
- Layzie Bone (Season 7; supporting cast member in season 6): member of Bone Thugs-n-Harmony
- Sakoya Wynter (Season 7; supporting cast member in season 6): daughter of Joel "JoJo" Hailey and baby's mama of Daniel Jacobs
- Lil Twist (Season 7; supporting cast member in seasons 4–6): rapper currently signed to Young Money Entertainment
- Tyran Denton (Season 7; supporting cast member in seasons 5–6): Egypt's brother
- Shawn Rogers (Season 7; supporting cast member in seasons 5–6): Tee Tee's husband
- Lil Eazy E (Season 7; supporting cast member in seasons 4–6): son of Eazy-E (real name Eric Wright, Jr.). He was in a relationship with Briana.
- Bow Wow (Season 7; supporting cast member in season 3–5): rapper and actor, who grew up a child rap star under the tutelage of Jermaine Dupri, Snoop Dogg, and Da Brat. Angela's ex-fiance. Bow Wow is also main cast member on Growing Up Hip Hop: Atlanta.
- Kristinia DeBarge (Seasons 1–4): daughter of James DeBarge of DeBarge. DeBarge's debut single "Goodbye" went platinum and DeBarge has continued to make music over the years. She has the desire to find out if she has a half-sister, whose mother was speculated for years to be Janet Jackson, in beginning in the second season. The third season chronicles her desire to put out music, but faces rumors about sleeping with her producer.
- TJ Mizell (Seasons 1–2; supporting cast member in season 3): son of Jam Master Jay of Run-DMC
- Damon "Boogie" Dash (Seasons 1–6): son of Linda Williams and Damon Dash
- Savannah Jordan (Season 6–7): daughter of Stevie J and Boogie's love interest

=== Supporting ===
| Cast member | Seasons | | | | | | |
| Cast member | 1 | 2 | 3 | 4 | 5 | 6 | 7 |
|---|---|---|---|---|---|---|---|
| Master P | Supporting | Supporting | Supporting | Supporting | Supporting | | |
| Pepa | Supporting | Supporting | Supporting | Supporting | Supporting | Supporting | Supporting |
| Damon Dash | Supporting | Supporting | Supporting | Supporting | Supporting | | |
| Rev Run | Supporting | | | | Supporting | Guest | |
| Andre King | | Supporting | | | | | |
| Kyndall Ferguson | | | | Supporting | | | |
| Raquel Horn | | | Guest | Supporting | Supporting | | |
| Tanice Amira | | | | Guest | Supporting | Supporting | Supporting |
| Treach | Guest | Guest | Guest | Guest | Supporting | Supporting | Supporting |
| Ava Dash | | | Guest | Guest | Supporting | | |
| Troy | | | Guest | Guest | Supporting | | |
| Maureen "Aunt Bev" | | | | | Supporting | Supporting | |
| Stevie J | | | | | | Supporting | |
| Steven Jordan, Jr. | | | | | | Supporting | |
| Uncle Luke | | | | | | Supporting | Supporting |
| Devin Hailey | | | | | | Supporting | Supporting |
| Joel "JoJo" Hailey | | | | | | Guest | Supporting |
| Tashaunda "Tiny" Hailey | | | | | | Supporting | Supporting |
| Buck | | | | | | | Supporting |
| Drew Sangster | | | | | | | Supporting |
| Cedric "K-Ci" Hailey | | | | | | | Supporting |
| Aaliyah Wright | | | | | Guest | Guest | Supporting |

- Pepa: Egypt Criss' mother
- Rev Run (Seasons 1–6): Angela and Vanessa Simmons' father. He later joined the cast of Growing Up Hip Hop: New York along with his son Jojo.
- Tanice Amira (Seasons 5–7; guest appearance in season 4): Jojo Simmons' wife
- Treach (Seasons 5–7; guest appearance in seasons 1–4): Egypt's father
- Uncle Luke (Seasons 6–7): Cree's father
- Devin Hailey (Seasons 6–7): Son of Cedric "K-Ci" Hailey
- Joel "JoJo" Hailey (Season 7; guest in season 6): Sakoya Wynter's father
- Tashaunda "Tiny" Hailey (Seasons 6–7): Sakoya Wynter's mother
- Buck (Season 7): Tanice's stepfather
- Drew Sangster (Season 7): girlfriend and baby's mama of Romeo Miller
- Cedric "K-Ci" Hailey (Season 7): Devin Hailey's father
- Aaliyah Wright (Season 7; guest in seasons 5–6): Lil Eazy E's wife
- Master P (Seasons 1–5): Romeo Miller's father
- Damon Dash (Seasons 1–5): Boogie Dash' father
- Andre King (Season 2): Swizz Beatz' brother
- Kyndall Ferguson (Season 4): daughter of El DeBarge and cousin of Kristinia
- Raquel Horn (Seasons 4–5; guest appearance in season 3): Damon Dash's girlfriend
- Ava Dash (Season 5; guest appearance in seasons 3–4): daughter of Damon Dash
- Troy (Season 5; guest appearance in seasons 3–4): former hairstylist and friend of Pepa
- Maureen "Aunt Bev" (Seasons 5–6): mother of Tee Tee and sister of Pepa
- Stevie J (Seasons 6–7): father of Savannah, Dorian and Steven, Jr.
- Steven Jordan, Jr. (Seasons 6–7): son of Stevie J

== Episodes ==
=== Series overview ===
| Season | Episodes | Originally released | |
| Season | Episodes | First released | Last released |
|---|---|---|---|
| 1 | 6 | January 7, 2016 | February 11, 2016 |
| 2 | 10 | October 13, 2016 | December 22, 2016 |
| 3 | 10 | July 20, 2017 | September 21, 2017 |
| 4 | 23 | May 24, 2018 | March 14, 2019 |
| 5 | 23 | December 5, 2019 | June 18, 2020 |
| 6 | 24 | May 13, 2021 | March 24, 2022 |
| 7 | 10 | January 5, 2023 | March 9, 2023 |

=== Season 1 (2016) ===
| No. overall | No. in season | Title | Original release date | US viewers (millions) |
|---|---|---|---|---|
| 1 | 1 | "The Master Plan" | January 7, 2016 | 0.84 |
| 2 | 2 | "The Struggle Is Real" | January 14, 2016 | 0.60 |
| 3 | 3 | "Run to Miami" | January 21, 2016 | 0.71 |
| 4 | 4 | "O Romeo, Romeo" | January 28, 2016 | 0.61 |
| 5 | 5 | "Master Player" | February 4, 2016 | 0.60 |
| 6 | 6 | "Master of My Fate" | February 11, 2016 | 0.65 |

=== Season 2 (2016) ===
| No. overall | No. in season | Title | Original release date | US viewers (millions) |
|---|---|---|---|---|
| 7 | 1 | "Blinged Up, Throne Down" | October 13, 2016 | 0.60 |
| 8 | 2 | "Boogie Down" | October 20, 2016 | 0.53 |
| 9 | 3 | "Run in the Oven" | October 27, 2016 | 0.59 |
| 10 | 4 | "Immaculate Deception" | November 3, 2016 | 0.52 |
| 11 | 5 | "Only God and Janet Would Know" | November 10, 2016 | 0.53 |
| 12 | 6 | "Busta Crime" | November 17, 2016 | 0.60 |
| 13 | 7 | "Straight Trippin'" | December 1, 2016 | 0.61 |
| 14 | 8 | "Denial Ain't Just a River in Egypt" | December 8, 2016 | 0.58 |
| 15 | 9 | "Lie to Fly" | December 15, 2016 | 0.59 |
| 16 | 10 | "Empire State of Mind" | December 22, 2016 | 0.52 |

=== Season 3 (2017) ===
| No. overall | No. in season | Title | Original release date | US viewers (millions) |
|---|---|---|---|---|
| 17 | 1 | "Cash Me in New Orleans" | July 20, 2017 | 0.55 |
| 18 | 2 | "Bad and Boogie" | July 27, 2017 | 0.54 |
| 19 | 3 | "Bad to the Throne" | August 3, 2017 | 0.54 |
| 20 | 4 | "Gossip Girl" | August 10, 2017 | 0.60 |
| 21 | 5 | "Mo Money Mo Problems" | August 17, 2017 | 0.51 |
| 22 | 6 | "Let's Talk About Pep" | August 24, 2017 | 0.63 |
| 23 | 7 | "Treacherous Waters" | August 31, 2017 | 0.49 |
| 24 | 8 | "Count Your Blessings" | September 7, 2017 | 0.54 |
| 25 | 9 | "Spilling the Tee Tee" | September 14, 2017 | 0.56 |
| 26 | 10 | "Sticks and Bones and Broken Thrones" | September 21, 2017 | 0.66 |

=== Season 4 (2018–19) ===
| No. overall | No. in season | Title | Original release date | US viewers (millions) |
|---|---|---|---|---|
| 27 | 1 | "Yo Gotti Got the Next Date?" | May 24, 2018 | 0.47 |
| 28 | 2 | "The Boy Is Mine" | May 31, 2018 | 0.52 |
| 29 | 3 | "Game of Thrones" | June 7, 2018 | 0.45 |
| 30 | 4 | "Blurred Lines" | June 14, 2018 | 0.49 |
| 31 | 5 | "No More Boogie Nights" | June 21, 2018 | 0.52 |
| 32 | 6 | "A Ninja in the Shadows" | June 28, 2018 | 0.48 |
| 33 | 7 | "The Cupid Shuffle" | July 5, 2018 | 0.53 |
| 34 | 8 | "Straight Outta Rehab" | July 12, 2018 | 0.47 |
| 35 | 9 | "Tee Tee With the Good Hair" | July 19, 2018 | 0.51 |
| 36 | 10 | "Let's Talk About Sam" | July 26, 2018 | 0.49 |
| 37 | 11 | "What Heirs in Vegas, Stays in Vegas" | August 2, 2018 | 0.49 |
| 38 | 12 | "Hard Times" | January 10, 2019 | 0.56 |
| 39 | 13 | "Meet Your New Daddy" | January 10, 2019 | 0.62 |
| 40 | 14 | "This Ain't My First Rodeo" | January 17, 2019 | 0.47 |
| 41 | 15 | "Don't Get It Twisted" | January 17, 2019 | 0.50 |
| 42 | 16 | "The Battle of the Lil's" | January 24, 2019 | 0.59 |
| 43 | 17 | "Wherefore Art Thou Romeo?" | January 31, 2019 | 0.54 |
| 44 | 18 | "Leave Me Alone" | February 7, 2019 | 0.54 |
| 45 | 19 | "Everyday We Strugglin'" | February 14, 2019 | 0.53 |
| 46 | 20 | "Hot Grass Mess" | February 21, 2019 | 0.56 |
| 47 | 21 | "Imma Throw You a Drank" | February 28, 2019 | 0.55 |
| 48 | 22 | "Will You Be My Feyonce?" | March 7, 2019 | 0.60 |
| 49 | 23 | "Run to You" | March 14, 2019 | 0.59 |

=== Season 5 (2019–20) ===
| No. overall | No. in season | Title | Original release date | US viewers (millions) |
|---|---|---|---|---|
| 50 | 1 | "The Gospel of Romeo" | December 5, 2019 | 0.36 |
| 51 | 2 | "Fireworks, Boom!" | December 12, 2019 | 0.45 |
| 52 | 3 | "A Proposal in the Heir" | December 19, 2019 | 0.35 |
| 53 | 4 | "No Run in the Oven" | December 26, 2019 | 0.46 |
| 54 | 5 | "Serving the Tee Tee" | January 2, 2020 | 0.42 |
| 55 | 6 | "Yo Boogie Got the Next Date" | January 9, 2020 | 0.41 |
| 56 | 7 | "Watch Out Sammy" | January 16, 2020 | 0.40 |
| 57 | 8 | "Is That the Joker?" | January 23, 2020 | 0.39 |
| 58 | 9 | "Nothing a Few Shots Can't Fix" | January 30, 2020 | 0.45 |
| 59 | 10 | "Love and War" | February 6, 2020 | 0.46 |
| 60 | 11 | "JoJo Makes a No-No" | February 13, 2020 | 0.37 |
| 61 | 12 | "Popping Off" | February 20, 2020 | 0.42 |
| 62 | 13 | "New Chapters" | February 27, 2020 | 0.47 |
| 63 | 14 | "Check Yourself Before You Treach Yourself" | March 5, 2020 | 0.53 |
| 64 | 15 | "Bring Da Ruckus" | April 23, 2020 | 0.47 |
| 65 | 16 | "Gangsta's Paradise" | April 30, 2020 | 0.41 |
| 66 | 17 | "The Royal Rumble" | May 7, 2020 | 0.46 |
| 67 | 18 | "The Master Demand" | May 14, 2020 | 0.53 |
| 68 | 19 | "The Setup" | May 21, 2020 | 0.58 |
| 69 | 20 | "Sit Down, Throne Down" | May 28, 2020 | 0.57 |
| 70 | 21 | "A Treacherous Heart" | June 4, 2020 | 0.54 |
| 71 | 22 | "Pop Up, Pop Off" | June 11, 2020 | 0.46 |
| 72 | 23 | "Fire & Desire" | June 18, 2020 | 0.44 |

=== Season 6 (2021–22) ===
| No. overall | No. in season | Title | Original release date | US viewers (millions) |
|---|---|---|---|---|
| 73 | 1 | "Subscribe or Step Aside" | May 13, 2021 | 0.30 |
| 74 | 2 | "Don't Be Salty" | May 20, 2021 | N/A |
| 75 | 3 | "Her Backyard Is Not Clean" | May 27, 2021 | 0.27 |
| 76 | 4 | "Loyalty Is Dead" | June 3, 2021 | 0.31 |
| 77 | 5 | "Every Woman for Themselves" | June 10, 2021 | N/A |
| 78 | 6 | "Nip It in the Bud" | June 17, 2021 | 0.32 |
| 79 | 7 | "Light Everything Ablaze" | June 24, 2021 | 0.37 |
| 80 | 8 | "The Elephant in the Room" | July 1, 2021 | 0.34 |
| 81 | 9 | "Some Type of Swindle" | July 8, 2021 | 0.40 |
| 82 | 10 | "Coming in Hot" | July 15, 2021 | 0.37 |
| 83 | 11 | "The Showcase" | July 22, 2021 | 0.35 |
| 84 | 12 | "Don't Start the Fire" | July 29, 2021 | N/A |
| 85 | 13 | "Legacy Will Not Be Lit" | January 6, 2022 | 0.25 |
| 86 | 14 | "Twist & Shout" | January 13, 2022 | 0.29 |
| 87 | 15 | "Parental Advisory" | January 20, 2022 | 0.35 |
| 88 | 16 | "On Demon Time" | January 27, 2022 | 0.34 |
| 89 | 17 | "The Naked Hustle" | February 3, 2022 | 0.35 |
| 90 | 18 | "Thugs-n-Matrimony" | February 10, 2022 | 0.36 |
| 91 | 19 | "Breaking Generational Curses" | February 17, 2022 | 0.36 |
| 92 | 20 | "I Can't Stand the Rain" | February 24, 2022 | 0.33 |
| 93 | 21 | "Push It to the Altar" | March 3, 2022 | 0.28 |
| 94 | 22 | "Beef N Pepa" | March 10, 2022 | N/A |
| 95 | 23 | "Let's Elope Now" | March 17, 2022 | N/A |
| 96 | 24 | "The Wright Way" | March 24, 2022 | N/A |

=== Season 7 (2023) ===
| No. overall | No. in season | Title | Original release date | US viewers (millions) |
|---|---|---|---|---|
| 97 | 1 | "Parents Just Don't Understand" | January 5, 2023 | 0.27 |
| 98 | 2 | "Sneak Diss" | January 12, 2023 | N/A |
| 99 | 3 | "Family Business" | January 19, 2023 | N/A |
| 100 | 4 | "Tuck and Roll" | January 26, 2023 | N/A |
| 101 | 5 | "Secrets, Snowcones, and Scuffles" | February 2, 2023 | N/A |
| 102 | 6 | "Mending Fences" | February 9, 2023 | N/A |
| 103 | 7 | "Ice Buck Challenge" | February 16, 2023 | N/A |
| 104 | 8 | "Romeo, Romeo" | February 26, 2023 | N/A |
| 105 | 9 | "Bones to Pick" | March 2, 2023 | N/A |
| 106 | 10 | "50 Years of Hip Hop" | March 9, 2023 | N/A |

== Spin-offs ==
=== Growing Up Hip Hop: Atlanta ===
The first spin-off titled Growing Up Hip Hop: Atlanta premiered on May 25, 2017.

=== Growing Up Hip Hop: New York ===
The second spin-off titled Growing Up Hip Hop: New York premiered on August 29, 2019.
