= The Michael Vick Project =

- Created by: James DuBose
- Presented by: DuBose Entertainment
- Country of origin: United States
- No. of seasons: 1
- No. of episodes: 10

Production
- Production locations: Atlanta, GA
- Running time: 22 minutes

Original release
- Network: BET
- Release: February 2 – April 6, 2010

The Michael Vick Project is an American docu-series following football player Michael Vick, executive produced by James DuBose. The ten-part docu-series premiered on February 2, 2010, on BET, and aired its last episode on April 6, 2010. It chronicled the widely publicized and criticized plummet of the NFL's one-time highest paid player.

== Critical reception ==
Hank Stuverer, in a review for The Washington Post which was reprinted in the Boston Globe, gave the series a mixed reception. He described it as "far from a defensive vanity project" but thought that it needed "an objective outsider who will ask tougher questions".
