= Dirty Dancing: Living the Dream =

- Official title-card
- Also known as: Dirty Dancing
- Genre: Reality competition television
- Based on: Dirty Dancing by Eleanor Bergstein
- Country of origin: United States
- Original language: English
- No. of seasons: 1
- No. of episodes: 8

Original release
- Release: December 6, 2006 – January 24, 2007

Dirty Dancing: Living the Dream (also known simply as, Dirty Dancing) is an American reality television series. The series was hosted by Cris Judd and was shown on WE: Women's Entertainment. Fifteen men and fifteen women were paired for a dance competition. Each episode featured couples learning dance routines with the weakest couples eliminated from the competition. Cris Judd and Eddie Garcia were the choreographers.
