= Picciano =

- Comune
- Comune di Picciano
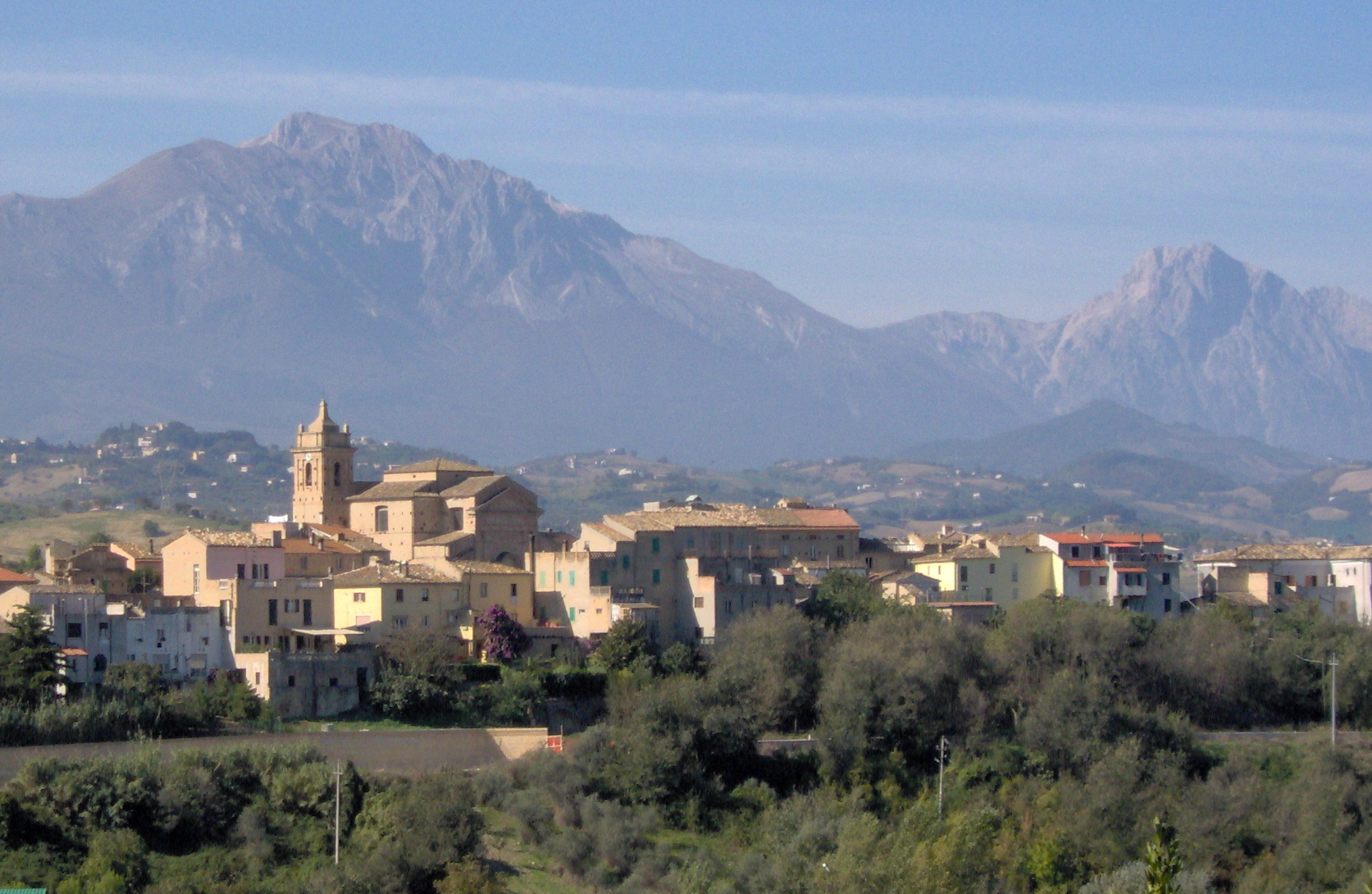
- View of Picciano from the east

- Location within Italy Location within Abruzzo
- Coordinates: 42°28′N 13°59′E
- Country: Italy
- Region: Abruzzo
- Province: Pescara (PE)
- Frazioni: Piccianello, Pagliari, Colletti, Le Piane, Incotte, Casette, Colli, Fontanelle.

Government
  - Mayor: Marino Marini

Area
  - Total: 7 km^{2} (2.7 sq mi)
- Elevation: 153 m (502 ft)

Population (December 31, 2006)
  - Total: 1,398
  - Density: 200/km^{2} (520/sq mi)
- Demonym: Piccianesi
- Time zone: UTC+1 (CET)
  - Summer (DST): UTC+2 (CEST)
- Postal code: 65010
- Dialing code: 085
- Patron saint: San Vincenzo Ferreri
- Saint day: 1st Sunday after Easter

Picciano is a village and comune in Italy in the Province of Pescara, within the Abruzzo region. Its population at the end of 2006 was 1,398.

== History ==
Picciano is first mentioned in 1049 when Bernardo Earl of Penne, with the Charta Offersionis, gave fields and buildings to build a Benedictine abbey in its hills. This is the first indication of the existence of a town called Picciano. and could be considered its terminus ante quem.

Many legends are known about the origin of the name "Picciano", the most believable talks about shepherds devoted to the Goddess Pithia; other variants of the name, found in the Charta Convenientiae, is "Piczano" so that perhaps the name of the town can be dated back to the Early Middle Age, avoiding conjectures about Roman origins.

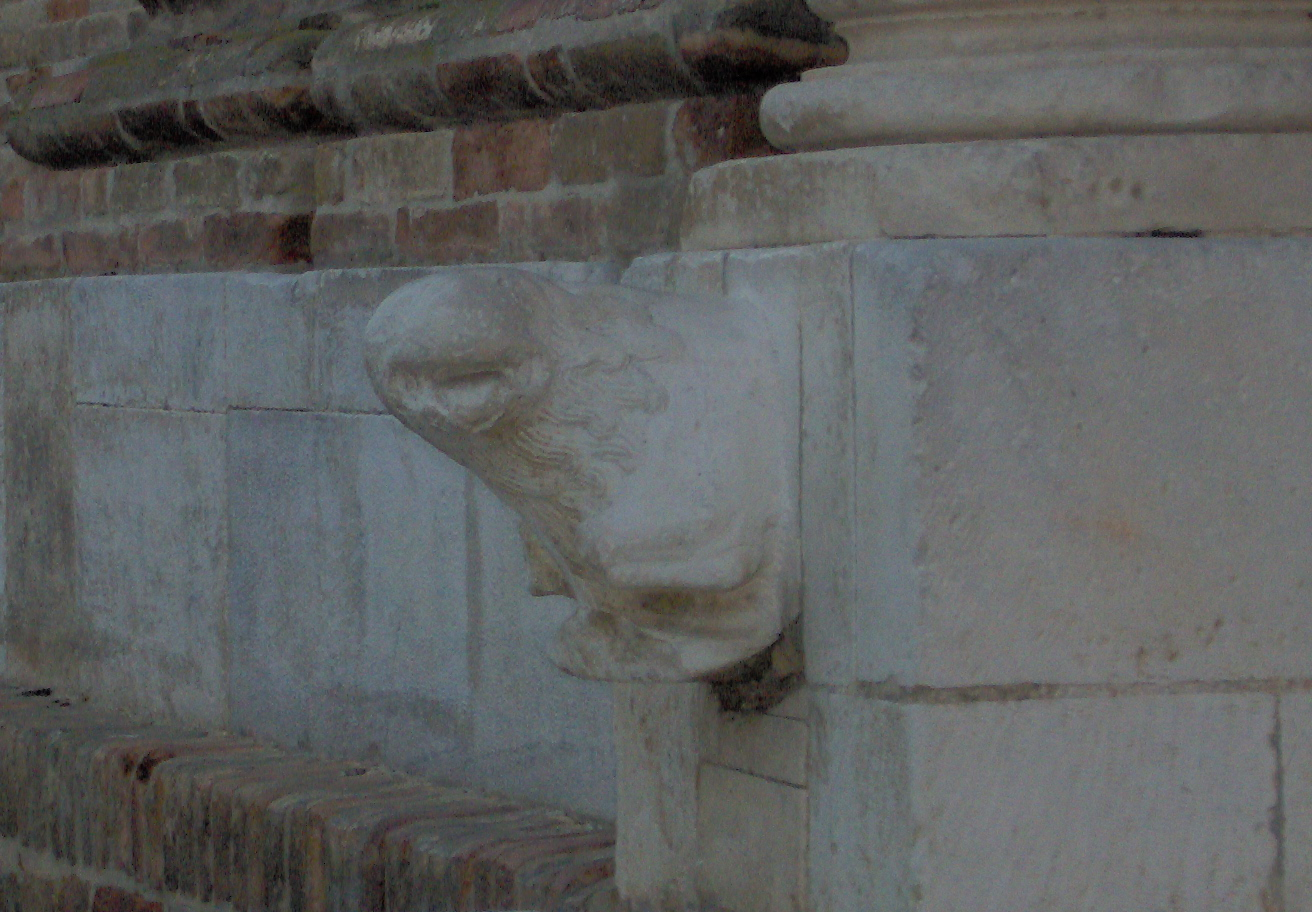
One of the two marble Lions coming from the ancient Abbey.

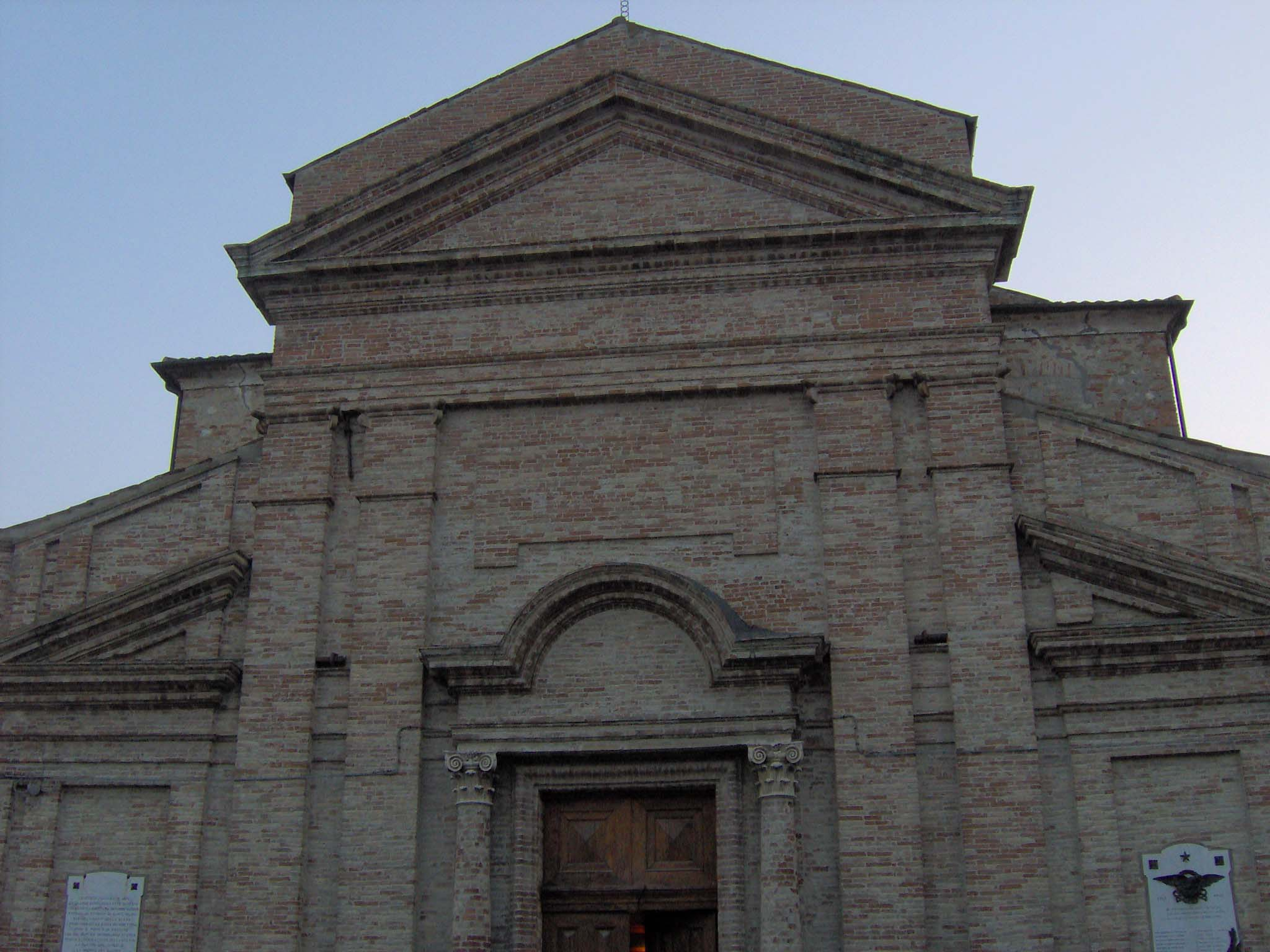
S. Maria del Soccorso Church, Picciano, Façade

== Images ==
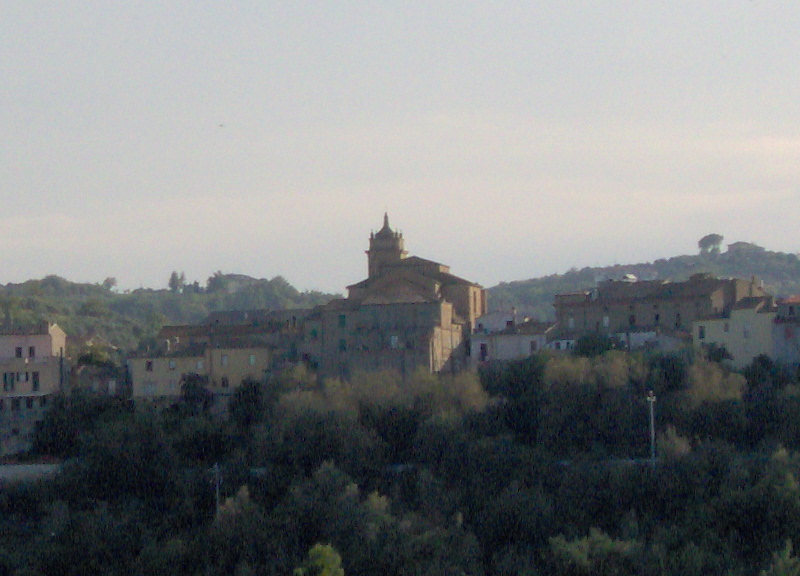
The campanile of Santa Maria del Soccorso from north

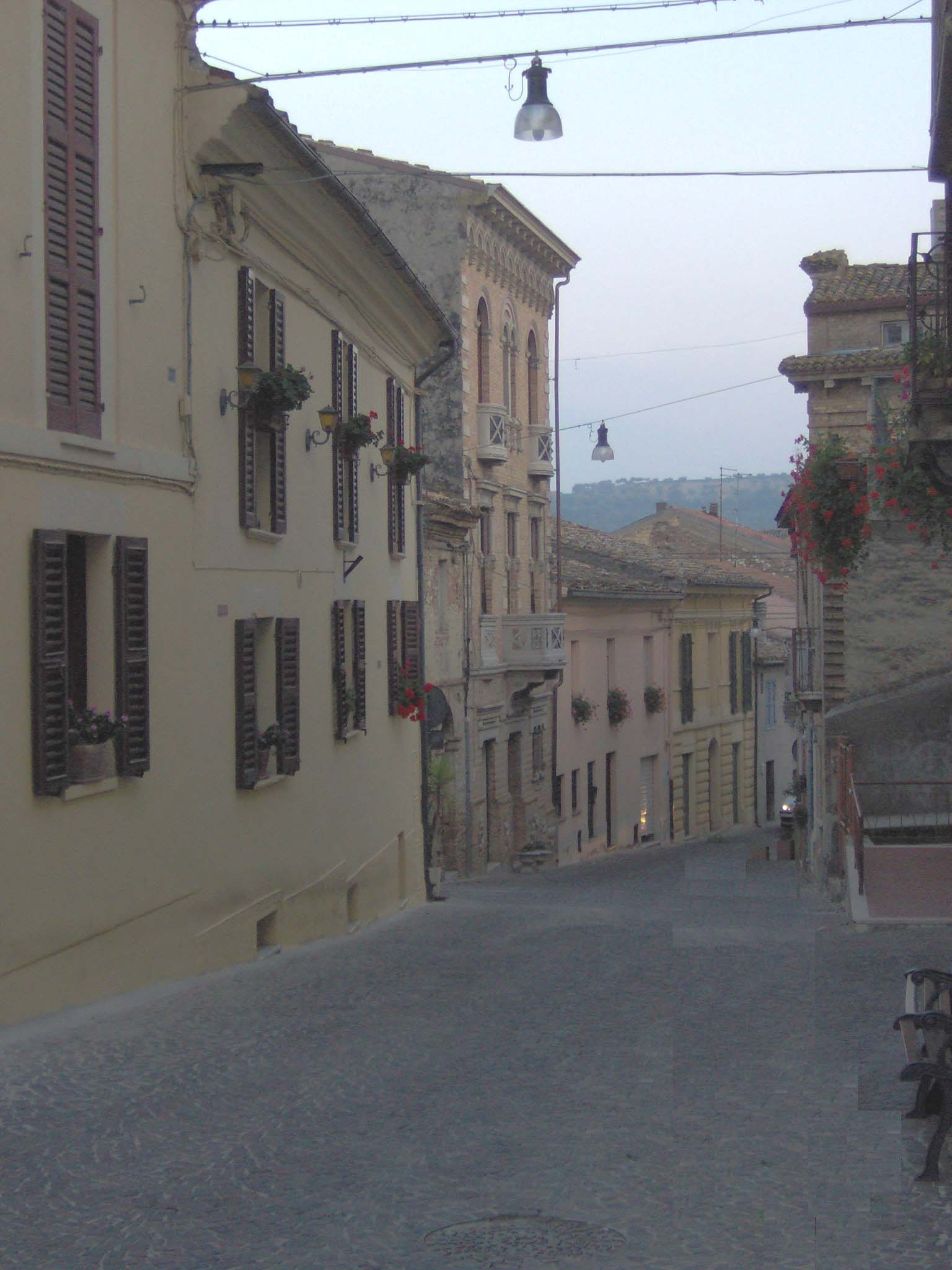
Picciano, Historic Centre

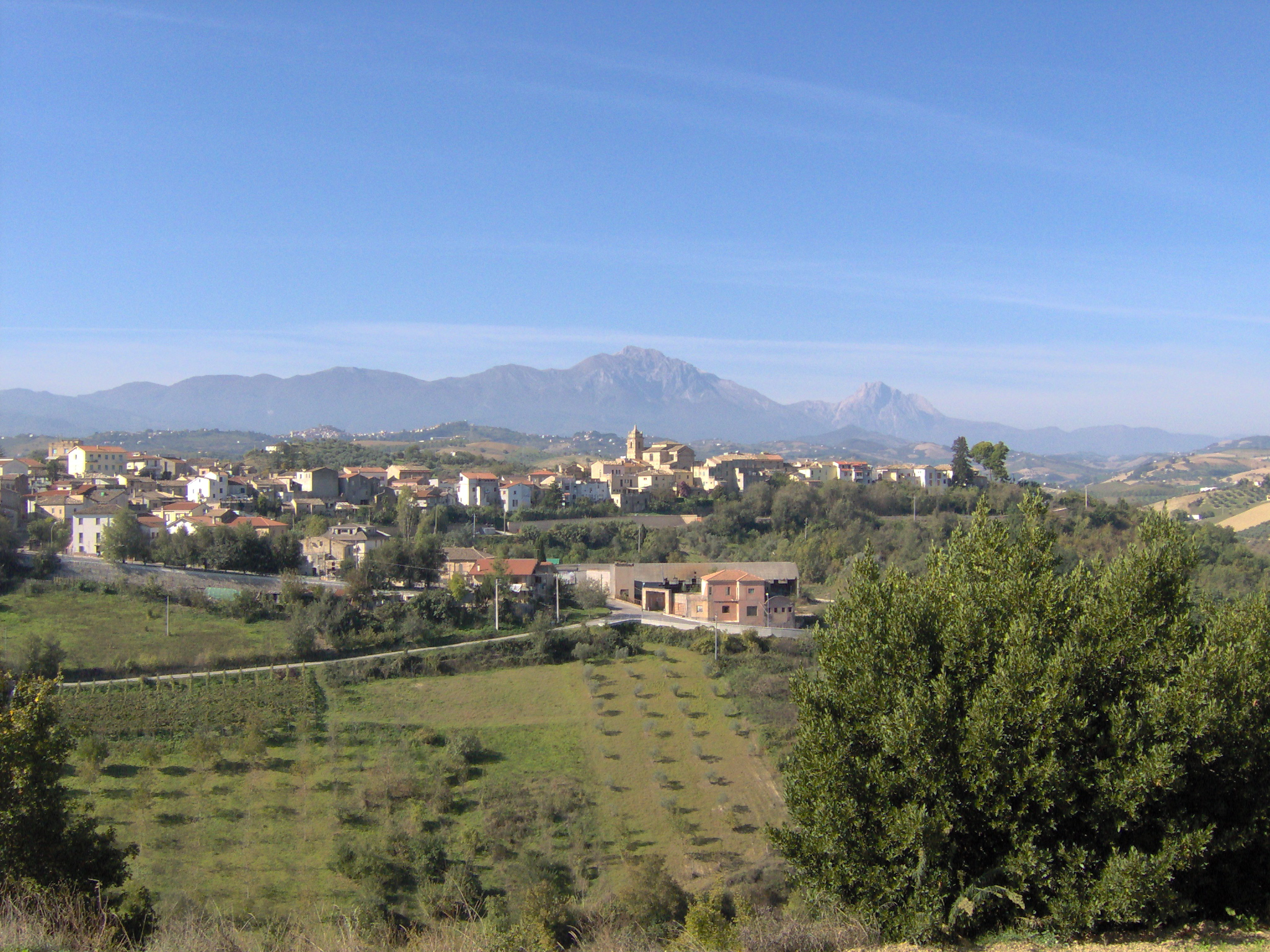
Picciano & La Bella Addormentata

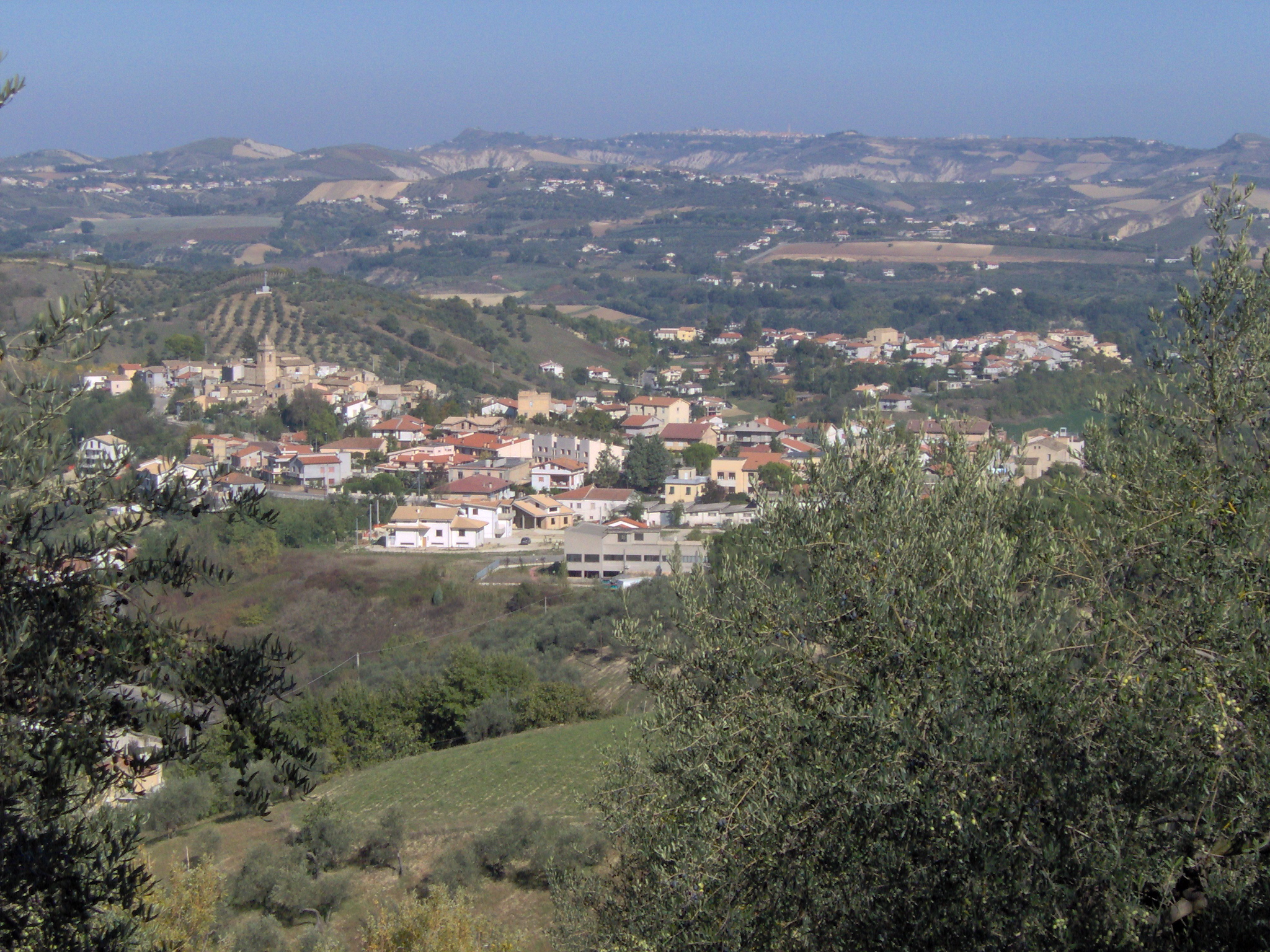
Picciano e Piccianello

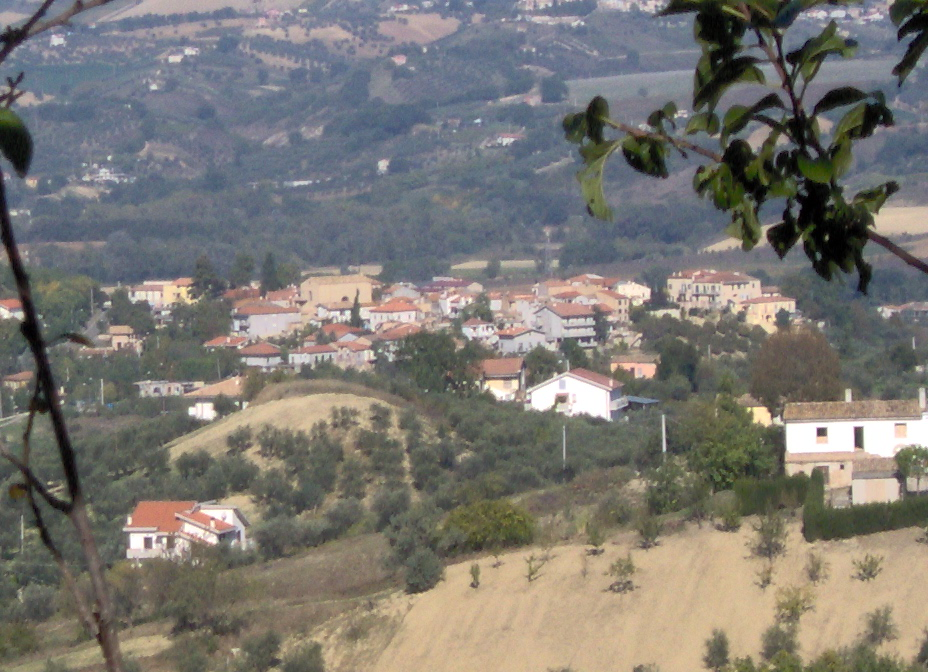
Piccianello from south

== See also ==
- Picciano (surname)
