= We TV =

American pay television channel

- Country: United States
- Broadcast area: Nationwide
- Headquarters: New York City, United States

Programming
- Language: English
- Picture format: 1080i HDTV (downscaled to letterboxed 480i for the SDTV feed)

Ownership
- Owner: AMC Global Media
- Sister channels: AMC; BBC America; IFC; Sundance TV

History
- Launched: September 1, 1997; 29 years ago
- Former names: Romance Classics (1997–2000); WE: Women's Entertainment (2000–2006)

Links
- Website: www.wetv.com

Availability

Streaming media
- Service(s): DirecTV Stream, Philo, Sling TV, YouTube TV

We TV is an American cable television channel owned by AMC Global Media. The channel primarily airs lifestyle and entertainment programming targeting women, including reality television programs and acquired series.

The channel originally launched on September 1, 1997 as Romance Classics, a spin-off of AMC focusing primarily on romance films. It adopted its current branding in January 2001, pivoting to a general entertainment format targeting women. Later shifts in its programming have included a focus on reality series, and programming targeting African American women.

As of November 2023, We TV is available to approximately 64,000,000 pay television households in the United States, down from its 2017 peak of 87,000,000 households.

== History ==
=== Relaunch and early years ===
Romance Classics launched on September 1, 1997, under the ownership of what was then the Cablevision Systems Corporation-controlled Rainbow Media. It was originally a movie channel focusing mostly on romantic dramas and comedies, and television miniseries. Similar to the original format of AMC, the channel initially broadcast its films commercial-free. On January 1, 2001, the network was relaunched as WE: Women's Entertainment, taking on an ad-supported general entertainment format. By 2006, the network's name was shortened to WE tv.

WE's programming shifted towards reality shows in the 2000s. In addition to general fare (like Secret Lives of Women), the network became known for airing several shows related to weddings, such as Bridezillas, Big Easy Brides and My Fair Wedding with David Tutera. On August 18, 2009, Rainbow launched a sister network called Wedding Central. The channel lasted less than two years, closing in July 2011.

In January 2011, We TV signed Toni Braxton for a reality series, entitled Braxton Family Values, which is marketed as one of the flagship shows. The network was given a new logo and branding ahead of the show's launch, with the tagline "Life As WE Know It".

In March 2012, the network ordered 14 episodes of Kendra on Top, a reality show following the lives of Kendra Wilkinson and Hank Baskett, who previously appeared in the E! reality series Kendra. Kendra said the show focuses on "motherhood, parenthood, and wife hood". Kendra On Top premiered on June 5, 2012.

=== 2014–present ===
The We TV logo from September 2014 to June 2024

In June 2014, We TV unveiled a new logo and branding by Eloisa Iturbe AMC Networks president Marc Juris explained that while We TV was to remain "a leading destination for women on television and online", the goal of the new branding was to broaden the focus on the word "we" as representing shared experiences, describing it as "a powerful and universal theme which drives connection, conversation, collaboration and community". In promotional usage, the new wordmark was shown underlined within other words and phrases containing the letters "we", such as "Powerful" and "Tweet It".

During this period, the network attempted a move into scripted series. The Divide, which was originally pitched for AMC, was cancelled after a single season. Its second series, South of Hell, was burned off as a Black Friday programming stunt, with all episodes premiering as a marathon on November 27, 2015.

In 2018, We TV premiered Love After Lockup, a reality show following relationships formed by singles who had been recently released from prison. Benefitting from word of mouth via fans on social media, Love After Lockup was one of the fastest-growing, newly-launched reality series on cable that year, became We TV's second-highest rated series among women 25–54 behind Marriage Boot Camp. In 2019, the show and its spinoff Life After Lockup helped make We TV the highest-rated cable network among African American women 25–54 on Friday nights.

In December 2020, Urban Movie Channel (now Allblk) head Brett Dismuke became the general manager of both We TV and UMC, with plans to increase the synergies between the two services amid internal consolidations at AMC Networks, and ratings successes at the channel among African American audiences.

== List of programming broadcast by We TV ==
=== Current ===
==== Unscripted ====
- Growing Up Hip Hop (2016-2023, Reruns)
- Mama June: From Not to Hot (2017-present)
- Love After Lockup (2018-present)
- The Braxtons (2024-present)
- This Is Poly (2026-present)

==== Acquired ====
- 9-1-1
- Beyond the Pole (2021)
- Blue Bloods
- Bones
- Criminal Minds
- Double Cross (Allblk original series)
- Joseline's Cabaret (2021)
- Law & Order
- NCIS
- S.W.A.T.
- The Real Blac Chyna (2021)

=== Former programming ===
- Everyday Elegance with Colin Cowie (1999-2003)
- Fashion Flashback
- Cinematherapy (2001-09)

==== Scripted ====
- The Divide
- Kold x Windy
- South of Hell

==== Unscripted ====
- Braxton Family Values
- A Stand Up Mother
- Adoption Diaries
- Adventures in Doggie Day Care
- Alien Abduction: True Confessions
- Amazing Wedding Cakes
- America's Cutest Puppies
- American Princess
- Amsale Girls
- The Barnes Bunch
- Big Easy Brides
- Bould & Bougie
- Bride vs. Bride
- Bridezillas
- Bridezillas: Scared Fit
- Bulging Brides
- Cheerleader U
- Chris and Adrianne Do Russia (2-hour reality TV special)
- Cinematherapy
- Crimes of Passion
- The Cupcake Girls
- Cutting It: In the ATL
- Cyndi Lauper: Still So Unusual
- David Tutera's CELEBrations
- Designer to the Stars: Kari Whitman
- Deb's House
- Dirty Dancing
- Downsized
- Dr. Miami
- Driven to Love
- Ex Isle
- Extreme Ghost Stories
- Extreme Love
- Family Restaurant
- Fix My Family
- Ghosts in the Hood
- Girl Meets Cowboy
- Girl Meets Gown
- Growing Up Hip Hop: Atlanta
- Growing Up Hip Hop: New York
- Grown & Gospel
- Hair Trauma
- High School Confidential
- House of Curves
- Hustle & Soul
- I Want to Save Your Life
- Jilted?
- Jim & Chrissy: Vow or Never
- Joan & Melissa: Joan Knows Best?
- John Edward Cross Country
- Kendra on Top
- Kiss & Tell
- L.A. Hair
- Little Miss Perfect
- The Locator
- Love Thy Sister
- The Lylas
- Marriage Boot Camp: Reality Stars
- Marriage Boot Camp: Reality Stars Family Edition
- Mary Mary
- Match Made in Heaven
- Money. Power. Respect.
- Most Popular
- My Life Is a Telenovela
- Mystery Millionaire
- Obsessed with the Dress
- Party Mama's
- Platinum Babies
- Platinum Weddings
- Pregnant & Dating
- Raising Sextuplets
- Rescue Mediums
- Rich Bride Poor Bride
- Secret Lives of Women
- Sanya's Glam & Gold
- Selling It: In the ATL
- Sex Box
- Sex Change Hospital
- Shannen Says
- She House
- She's Moving In
- Sinbad: It's Just Family
- Sisters in Law
- Skating's Next Star
- Spend It Fast!
- Split Ends
- Staten Island Cakes
- Style Me with Rachel Hunter
- Sunset Daze
- SWV Reunited
- Tamar & Vince
- Tamar Braxton: Get Ya Life!
- Texas Multi Mamas
- Toya & Reginae
- The TS Madison Experience (March 4, 2021)
- Twister Sisters
- Ugliest House on the Block
- Unforgivable Crimes
- Untold Stories of Hip Hop
- Waka & Tammy: What The Flocka
- WE Investigates
- Wedding Central
- Wife, Mom, Bounty Hunter
- Women Behind Bars
- You're Wearing That?!?

==== Acquired ====
- 20/20
- 48 Hours
- Blue Planet II
- Boston Public
- Charmed
- Committed
- CSI: Miami
- Dharma & Greg
- The District
- Felicity
- Frasier
- Ghost Whisperer
- Girlfriends
- The Golden Girls
- The Great Christmas Light Fight
- Hope & Faith
- House
- How to Get Away with Murder
- JAG
- Kate & Allie
- Law & Order: Criminal Intent
- MacGyver
- Madam Secretary
- McLeod's Daughters
- Monk
- The Naked Truth
- Nash Bridges
- Ned and Stacey
- Orphan Black (AMC Studios)
- Roseanne
- Two Guys and a Girl
- Will & Grace

== See also ==
- Slice - Canadian cable channel that airs selected We TV programming from 2024.
