= Staten Island Cakes =

- Genre: Reality TV
- Starring: Vincent "Vinny" Buzzetta
- Country of origin: United States
- Original language: English
- No. of seasons: 1
- No. of episodes: 8

Production
- Executive producers: Annabelle McDonald; John Miller
- Production locations: Staten Island, New York, United States

Original release
- Network: WE tv
- Release: June 21, 2011

Staten Island Cakes is an American food reality-television series airing on WE tv. The series stars Vincent "Vinny" Buzzetta, an Italian-American cake artist who lives and works on Staten Island, a borough of New York City, New York.

== Cast ==
=== Vincent "Vinny" Buzzetta ===
Buzzetta was born on October 4, 1989, in the Brooklyn borough of New York City. He and his family moved to Staten Island when he was 13 years old, but he continued to attend Xaverian High School in Brooklyn, from which he graduated in 2007. In February 2008, Buzzetta graduated first in his class from the French Culinary Institute – located in New York City's Manhattan borough – the youngest person ever to complete the institute's program. On October 31, 2008, with financial backing from his grandfather, Buzzetta opened his bakery, The Cake Artist, on Forest Avenue in the West Brighton neighborhood of Staten Island.

=== Other cast members ===
- Cammy Picciano, Buzzetta's mother
- Kristin Buzzetta, Buzzetta's younger sister
- "Crazy Joe" Russo, Buzzetta's grandfather
- Spiro Grammatikopoulos, Buzzetta's best friend and life partner
- Rob Picciano, Buzzetta's stepfather
- Joe Celentano, Buzzetta's cousin
- Teresa Vocile, Buzetta's employee
- Jess Mari, Buzzetta's employee
- Sam Misiti, Buzzetta's employee

== Episodes ==
No.	Title	Original release date
1	"Vinny Turns 21"	June 21, 2011
2	"It's Going to the Dogs"	June 28, 2011
3	"Kristin Gets Cut Off"	July 5, 2011
4	"Celebrity Status"	July 30, 2011
5	"Spooktacular"	August 6, 2011
6	"Quit Horsing Around"	August 13, 2011
7	"Mambo Italiano"	August 20, 2011
8	"You Can Take the Boy Out of Staten Island..."	August 27, 2011
