= Dish Nation =

American syndicated television series

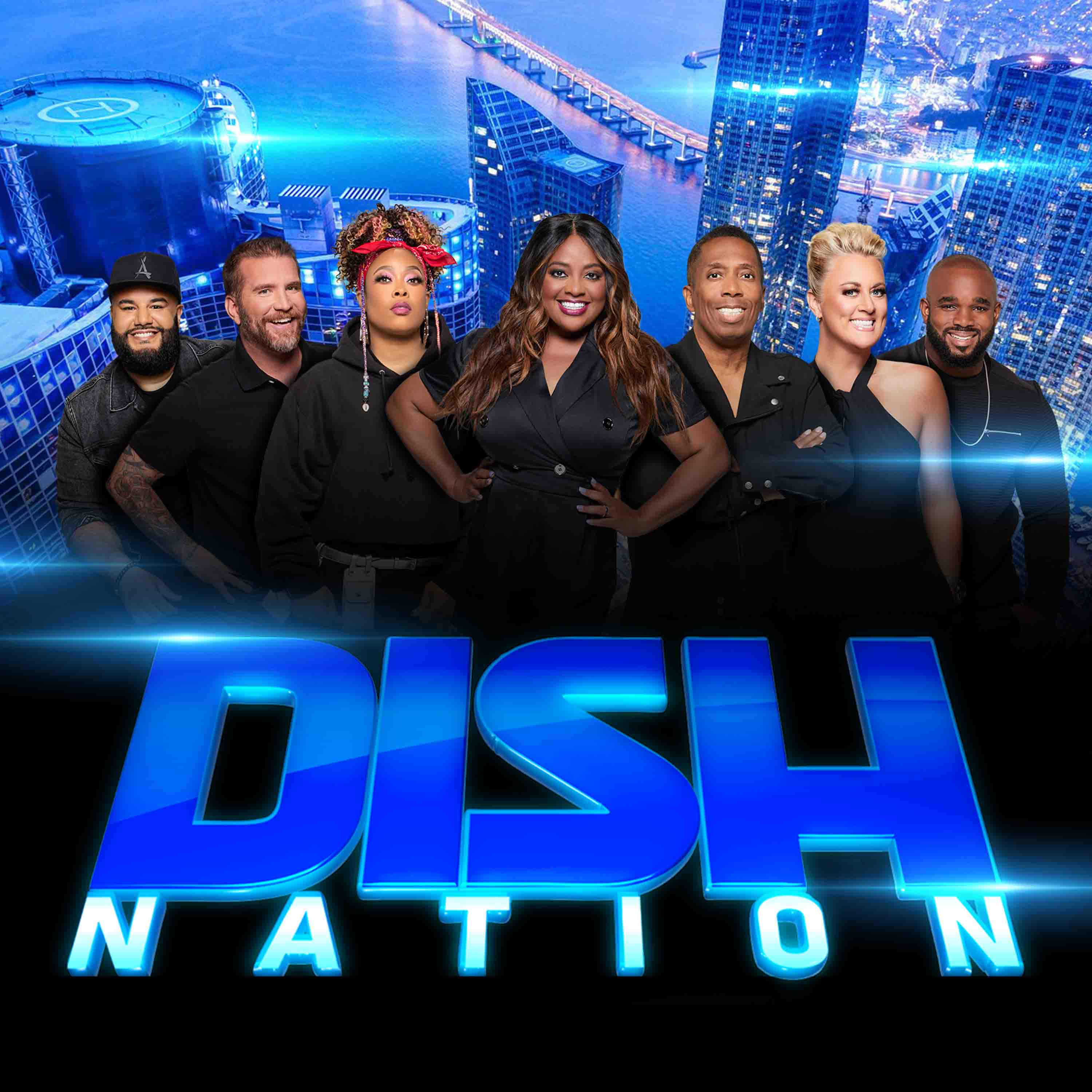
- Genre: Entertainment newsmagazine
- Created by: Stu Weiss
- Country of origin: United States
- Original language: English
- No. of seasons: 13

Production
- Executive producers: Joaquin Ferreira; James DuBose; Vincent Rutherford; Michael Bachmann; Stu Weiss
- Production locations: Atlanta, Georgia, US; Los Angeles, California, US
- Running time: 22 minutes
- Production companies: Bartholomew Productions; Giant Bowling Pin Productions, Inc.; Dino Bones Productions; Studio City; Fox First Run; 20th Television; Georgia Media

Original release
- Network: First-run syndication
- Release: July 25, 2011 (test run); September 10, 2012 – September 12, 2025 (nationwide launch)

Dish Nation is an American broadcast syndication, tabloid television, news broadcasting program distributed by Fox First Run for television stations throughout the United States. Debuting in 2011, it features celebrity news and pop-culture commentary delivered by celebrity personalities stationed nationwide. In November 2020, the series was renewed for two additional seasons, through the 2022–23 season.

Dish Nation's radio teams include Rickey Smiley, heard locally on Atlanta's WHTA and syndicated in over 60 markets nationwide, and Heidi & Frank, heard weekdays on KLOS in Los Angeles.

On January 29, 2025, it was announced that Dish Nation would end after thirteen seasons.

== Conception ==
Dish Nation was conceived in 2008 by broadcast marketing veteran and former radio DJ and TV weatherman Stu Weiss.

== Radio personalities ==
The radio teams include The Rickey Smiley Morning Show from Atlanta, which is heard on over 65 radio stations. The show features standup comic and theatrical star Rickey Smiley, as well as Headkrack, Gary with da Tea, and Da Brat. The Heidi & Frank Show from KLOS in Los Angeles features Heidi Hamilton and Frank Kramer, and formerly featured Erik Smith and Sammy Marino. Brooke & Jubal in the Morning from KQMV in Seattle, featured Brooke Fox and Jubal Flagg. The group was dropped from the show in 2015. The nationally syndicated The Kidd Kraddick Morning Show from Dallas, joined Dish Nation for season one in September 2012. The show starred J-Si Chavez, Kellie Raspberry, Jenna Owens, and Big Al Mack. They were dropped in December 2016.

During the 2011 Dish Nation summer test, recording artist DJ Felli Fel and Jessi Malay of Los Angeles' KPWR were a part of the radio roundtable. Blaine Fowler & Allyson Martinek in the Morning on WDVD in Detroit was also part of the original lineup, as was New York's Scott & Todd, starring Scott Shannon and Todd Pettengill on WPLJ. The DJ Laz Morning Show was added to the show's first season.

== Synopses ==
=== Summer test run ===
On July 25, 2011, Dish Nation premiered in a limited test run in seven markets. With the help of Madeleine Smithberg, co-creator of The Daily Show and Scott Rockett, co-creator of Hollywood Uncensored, the show began as a fast-paced entertainment round-table covering pop culture and celebrity news through four radio teams. The test show ran in the home markets where the radio shows were based (New York, Atlanta, Detroit, and Los Angeles), as well as in Baltimore, Washington, D.C., and Phoenix, Arizona. Hosts for the test run included WPLJ's Scott Shannon and Todd Pettengill, WHTA's nationally syndicated Rickey Smiley Morning Show, featuring Ebony Steele, Gary With Da Tea, and HeadKrack, as well as WDVD's Fowler and Martinek. Recording artist DJ Felli Fel and Jessi Malay, with comedian Michael Bachmann, were the show's Los Angeles hosts. Smiley would prove to be the longest-lasting contributor to the program, continuing to be featured until the end of the series.

Dish Nation averaged a 0.9 rating/2 share for the six-week test. It experienced an 11% increase in household ratings from the premiere week to the end of the six-week test. In Atlanta, Dish Nation finished ahead of Late Show with David Letterman and sitcoms and finished third in key demographics and household ratings. The show's median age of viewers was 43.1, the lowest among all entertainment magazine shows, according to Twentieth (TMZ 43.7, Access Hollywood 52.3, Extra 54.2, The Insider 55.2, Entertainment Tonight 56.6, Inside Edition 58).

=== Season 1 ===
Before the 2012 National Association of Television Program Executives conference, 20th Century Fox announced that Dish Nation would return for a 52-week, full-series run to premiere September 10, 2012. After the rating success of its first 100 episodes, 20th Television announced on January 25, 2013, that Dish Nation had been picked up for a second season. Stephen Brown, EVP of programming and development at 20th Television, credited the show's success to the viral and real-time nature of the program.

On July 27, 2013, Kidd Kraddick died in the New Orleans area while raising money for his charity, Kidd's Kids. Two days later, Dish Nation paid tribute to him with a special broadcast.

=== Season 2 ===
Season two premiered on September 10, 2013, with the cast of The Rickey Smiley Morning Show from Atlanta, the remaining cast members of The Kidd Kraddick Morning Show (formerly named Kidd Kraddick in the Morning) from Dallas, and The Heidi and Frank Show from Los Angeles.

In late 2013, the show was renewed for a third season, having finished first in key demographics among freshman and sophomore syndicated programs.

In July 2014, Ebony Steele was replaced by Claudia Jordan. That summer, Porsha Williams also joined the panel of hosts.

=== Season 3 ===
Season three premiered on September 8, 2014.

In November 2014, the show began to rotate the Dallas and LA crew on a day-to-day basis. The Seattle crew came in at various times and rotations. The Atlanta crew was the only group that appeared all five days a week.

On January 6, 2015, the show was renewed for two more years.

In July 2015, Claudia Jordan was dropped from the panel.

=== Season 4 ===
Season four premiered on September 7, 2015.

Rapper Da Brat was added as a main personality for the Atlanta team.

This season featured correspondents from other cities. Among them were Ben Campbell and Matt McAllister ("Ben and Matt") from KNIX-FM in Phoenix, the ill-received Miguel Fuller and Holly O'Connor ("Miguel and Holly") from WPOI in Tampa, Florida, and Anthony May ("Tone Kapone") from WGCI-FM in Chicago.

=== Season 5 ===
Season five premiered on September 5, 2016.

The Dallas team, The Kidd Kraddick Morning Show, left the show in late December 2016.

In January 2017, Dish Nation was renewed for two years. It averaged 4.1 million weekly viewers in the fifth season and continued to skew towards a younger audience, with a median age of 49.8.

=== Season 6 ===
Season six premiered on September 4, 2017.

Guests this season included Torrei Hart and Eva Marcille, among others.

=== Season 7 ===
Season seven premiered on September 3, 2018.

On February 22, 2019, Porsha Williams announced a temporary leave of absence from the show for her maternity leave. Williams returned to Dish Nation on June 24. Eva Marcille filled in for Williams during her leave.

=== Season 8 ===
Season eight premiered on September 2, 2019.

Following the completion of the acquisition of 21st Century Fox by Disney in March 2019, the distribution of Dish Nation, along with Divorce Court and the new 2019–20 game show 25 Words or Less, was transferred to a new division of Fox Corporation (which retained the broadcast network and sports assets of Fox) known as Fox First Run.

In November 2019, Dish Nation was renewed for a ninth season.

=== Season 9 ===
Sherri Shepherd was scheduled to join the program as a co-host for the new season.

=== Season 10 ===
Porsha Williams left after 8 years on the show.

=== Seasons 11–13 ===
Heidi Hamilton and Frank Kramer left Dish Nation after 10 years. Chuey Martinez no longer co-host but still with the show as a correspondent.

Tanner Thomason was promoted as co-host for season 11.

Sherri Shepherd left the show to focus on her talk show, Sherri. Her final Dish Nation months she was in limited episodes due to her talk show.

In January 2023, it was renewed for a 12th season, In addition, Tamar Braxton and Jessie Woo joined the show as co-hosts. The show was subsequently renewed for a thirteenth season, which was announced to be its last in January 2025. The final episode aired on September 12, 2025.

=== Side Dish ===
A live show hosted by HeadKrack, Tanner Thomason and Claudia Jordan titled Side Dish premiered on July 22, 2024, featuring weekly episodes airing on Fox Soul and through Dish Nation's YouTube channel.
