= Tiny and Toya =

- Genre: Reality
- Starring: Tameka "Tiny" Cottle; Antonia "Toya" Johnson-Rushing
- Country of origin: United States
- Original language: English
- No. of seasons: 2
- No. of episodes: 20

Production
- Executive producer: James DuBose
- Producers: Susan Marya Baronoff; Ashley Sylvester
- Production location: Atlanta, Georgia
- Running time: 22–24 minutes
- Production company: DuBose Entertainment

Original release
- Network: BET
- Release: June 28, 2009 – June 22, 2010

Tiny and Toya is an American reality television series starring Xscape singer-songwriter and the wife of rapper T.I., Tameka "Tiny" Cottle and Antonia "Toya" Johnson-Rushing, popularly known as the childhood sweetheart and ex-wife of Lil Wayne. With entertainment industry exec James DuBose serving as executive producer of the project, upon its debut on June 28, 2009, on BET, the series drew in more than three million viewers, the highest-rated series debut in BET history. In October 2009, a second season of the series was confirmed. The premiere for the second season was broadcast on BET on April 13, 2010.

== Episodes ==
=== Season 1 (2009) ===
No.	Title	Original release date
1	"A Secret Tip"	June 30, 2009
2	"Miami Forever"	July 14, 2009
3	"A Tiny Pain"	July 21, 2009
4	"Basic Training"	July 28, 2009
5	"Vent-Elation"	August 4, 2009
6	"The Talk"	August 11, 2009
7	"A Musical Escape"	August 18, 2009
8	"Pajama Party"	August 25, 2009

=== Season 2 (2010) ===
No.	Title	Original release date
1	"My Family, No Matter What"	April 13, 2010
2	"Music to My Ears"	April 20, 2010
3	"Easy Come, Easy Go"	April 27, 2010
4	"The Party's Over"	May 4, 2010
5	"Surprise, Surprise"	May 11, 2010
6	"Artists in Training"	May 18, 2010
7	"Tell It Like It Is"	May 25, 2010
8	"Fashion for Passion"	June 1, 2010
9	"Next Level"	June 8, 2010
10	"Out in the Open"	June 15, 2010
11	"Never Been Here, Never Done This"	June 22, 2010
12	"Something Strong. Something Complete."	June 22, 2010
