= Al Reynolds =

American football player (1938–2019)

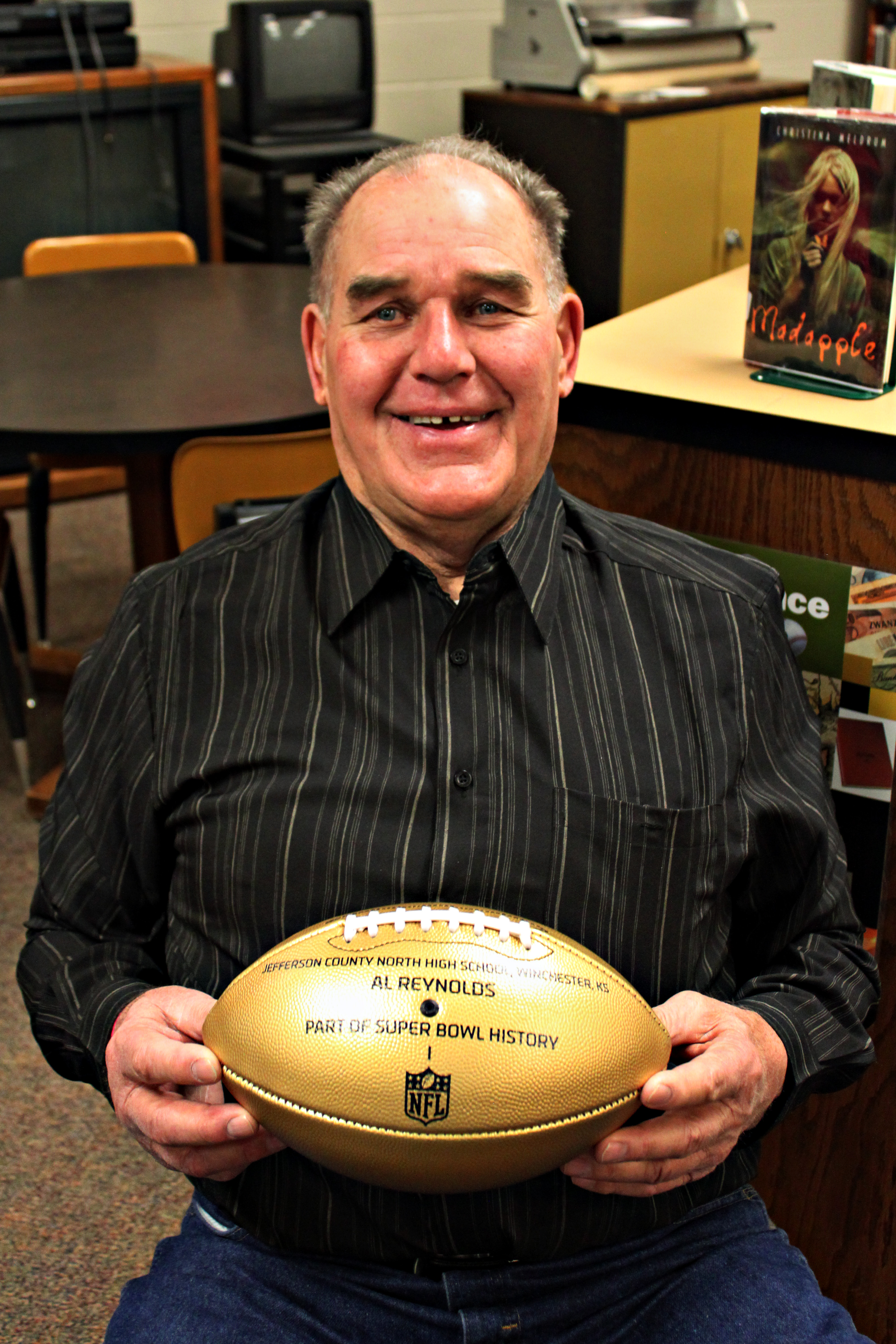
- Reynolds in 2016

No. 60
- Position: Guard

Personal information
- Born: February 15, 1938; Winchester, Kansas, U.S.
- Died: 11 December 2019 (aged 81)
- Listed height: 6 ft 3 in (1.91 m)
- Listed weight: 250 lb (113 kg)

Career information
- High school: Winchester (KS)
- College: Tarkio College

Career history
- Dallas Texans/Kansas City Chiefs (1960–1967)

Awards and highlights
- AFL champion (1962)

Career statistics
- Games played: 98
- Stats at Pro Football Reference

Allen F. Reynolds (February 15, 1938 – December 11, 2019) was an American college and professional football guard who played eight seasons in the American Football League from 1960–1967 for the Dallas Texans/Kansas City Chiefs. Allen is an alumnus of Tarkio College in Tarkio, Missouri where he was inducted into the Tarkio College Hall of Fame in 1987.

== Career ==
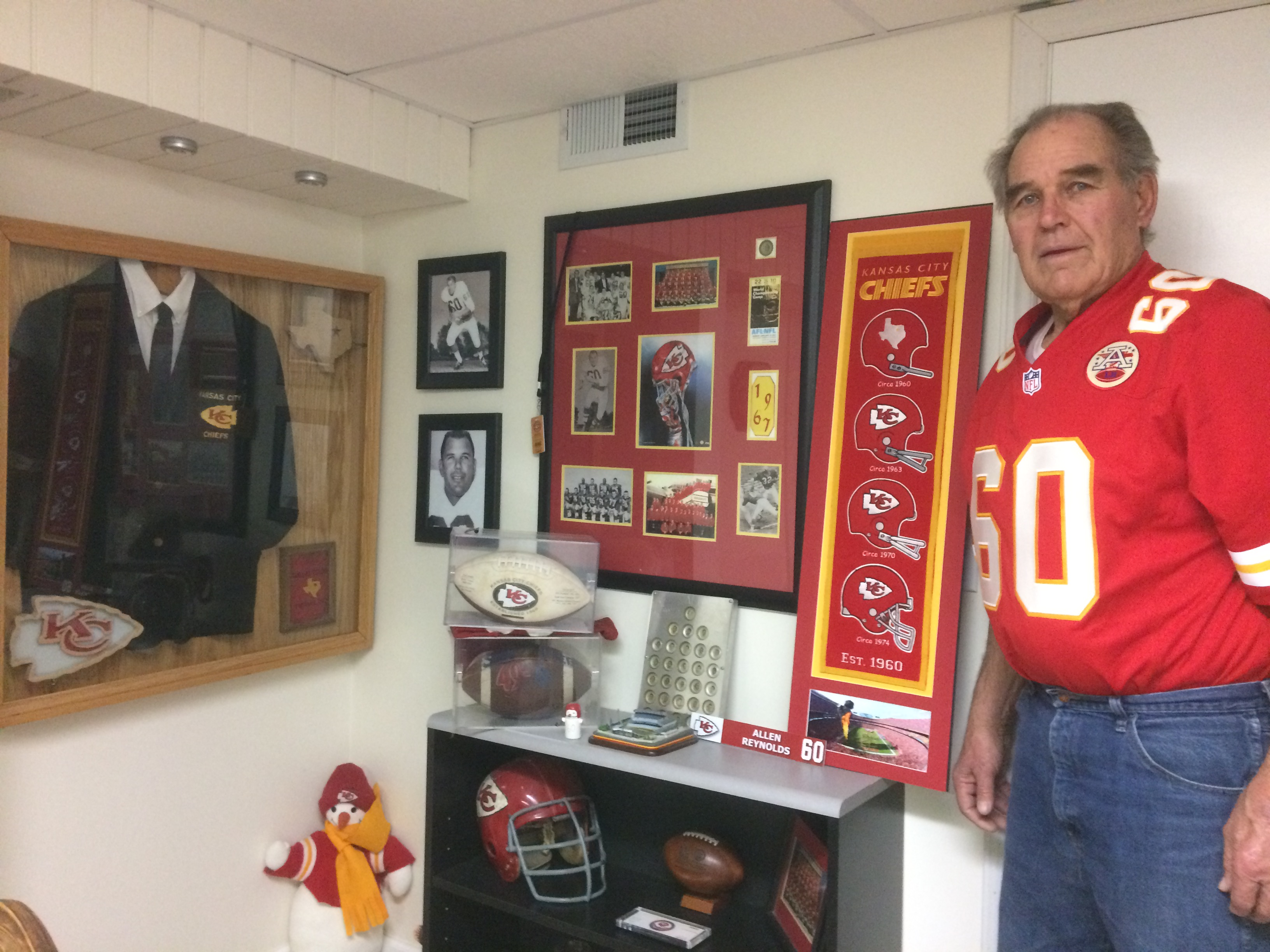
Reynolds pictured in 2017 with his helmet, team jacket, and other memorabilia from his time as a Kansas City Chiefs player.

Al Reynolds played in 98 games with the Texans/Chiefs and was a starter in 56 of those games through his career in the AFL. Al is also credited with 1 fumble in his career but when questioned about this his only reaction was "I did? I don't remember that." The NFL apparently doesn't know which game it was in. Only that the fumble occurred during the 1966 season in which the Chiefs went on to play Green Bay in the first AFL-NFL World Championship. Since Allen was an offensive lineman it can only be assumed this happened during an attempt to recover a fumble by another player.

Allen's official position was right guard but during his career with the Texans and Chiefs he proved valuable at several positions in the offensive line. He is credited with playing both left and right guard and well as playing right offensive tackle.

After the 1967 season Allen did not immediately retire from pro football. Before the 1968 season the AFL expanded into Cincinnati with the Bengals football club. During the expansion draft that year, the Bengals drafted several of the Kansas City Chiefs including offensive guard Allen Reynolds. Allen spent time with the team before the season began but ultimately decided to retire from pro football and keep his family rooted in Kansas City. He did not play any games with the Cincinnati Bengals.
