= Teen Choice Award for Choice TV – Reality Series =

Entertainment award category

The following is a list of Teen Choice Award winners and nominees for Choice TV – Reality Series. American Idol and Keeping Up with the Kardashians receives the most wins with 4.

== Winners and nominees ==
=== 2000s ===
Year	Winner	Nominees	Ref.
2001	Total Request Live	Boot Camp; Jackass; Making the Band; Popstars; The Real World: Back to New York; Survivor; Temptation Island	
2002	The Osbournes	American Idol; Becoming; Blind Date; Fear Factor; The Jamie Kennedy Experiment; The Real World: Chicago; Total Request Live	
2003	American Idol	The Bachelor; Fear Factor; The Jamie Kennedy Experiment; Joe Millionaire; Punk'd; Survivor; Total Request Live	
2004	Punk'd	America's Next Top Model; American Idol; Fear Factor; Newlyweds: Nick and Jessica; Pimp My Ride; The Simple Life: Interns; Survivor	
2005	American Idol	America's Next Top Model; The Ashlee Simpson Show; Britney & Kevin: Chaotic; Fear Factor; Growing Up Gotti; Punk'd; The Simple Life	
2006	American Idol	America's Next Top Model; Beauty and the Geek; Laguna Beach: The Real Orange County; Survivor: Guatemala; Yo Momma	
2007	American Idol	America's Next Top Model; Dancing with the Stars; The Hills; Pussycat Dolls Present	
2008	The Hills	Keeping Up with the Kardashians; Life of Ryan; Rob & Big; Run's House	
2009	The Hills	Jon & Kate Plus 8; Kathy Griffin: My Life on the D-List; Keeping Up with the Kardashians; Rob Dyrdek's Fantasy Factory	

=== 2010s ===
Year	Winner	Nominees	Ref.
2010	Keeping Up with the Kardashians	The Hills; Jersey Shore; The Price of Beauty; Taking the Stage	
2011	Jersey Shore	Khloé & Lamar; Kourtney and Kim Take New York; The Real World: Las Vegas (2011); Secret Millionaire	
2012	Punk'd	Dance Moms; Jersey Shore; Keeping Up with the Kardashians; Tia & Tamera	
2013	Keeping Up with the Kardashians	Dance Moms; Here Comes Honey Boo Boo; Married to Jonas; Tia & Tamera	
2014	Keeping Up with the Kardashians	Cosmos: A Spacetime Odyssey; Dance Moms; Real Husbands of Hollywood; Total Divas	
2015	The Voice	American Idol; Dance Moms; Keeping Up with the Kardashians; Lip Sync Battle; MasterChef Junior	
2016	Keeping Up with the Kardashians	Dance Moms; MasterChef Junior; Mob Wives; Total Divas; The Voice	
2017	The Voice	Chasing Cameron; Dance Moms; Keeping Up with the Kardashians; MasterChef Junior; Total Bellas	
2018	Keeping Up with the Kardashians	The Four: Battle for Stardom; Lip Sync Battle; MasterChef Junior; Total Divas; The Voice	
2019	America's Got Talent	Keeping Up with the Kardashians; Lip Sync Battle; The Masked Singer; Queer Eye; The Voice	
