= Good Clean Fun (production company) =

American television production company

Good Clean Fun was an American television production company based in Los Angeles. The company was founded by Jason Carbone and produces primarily reality docusoap content. Programming focuses on celebrity figures in music, television, and sports. In 2015, Good Clean Fun premiered two new series, Barely Famous on VH1 and Meet the Smiths on TBS, as well as a second season of Rev Run’s Sunday Suppers.

Barely Famous, a ground-breaking reality TV parody about sisters Erin and Sara Foster, premiered on March 18, 2015 on VH1. A second season is slated to air in 2016. Good Clean Fun also produced Meet the Smiths, a docuseries about retired NBA star and current TV basketball analyst for TNT Sports, Kenny "the Jet" Smith and his family. Meet the Smiths premiered on TBS on April 1, 2015. Rev Run's Sunday Suppers, which originally premiered on Cooking Channel on June 8, 2014 aired its second season in early 2015. A third season is currently in development.

Former productions for Good Clean Fun include Tia & Tamera and the NAACP Image Award winning Run's House. Tia & Tamera is a reality series starring former teen stars Tia and Tamera Mowry. The series premiered on August 8, 2011 to record-breaking numbers on Style Network, as the most-watched series premiere in Style history and has since aired three seasons. Run's House follows the family of Rev Run aka Joseph Simmons for 6 seasons on MTV.

Additionally, the company produced Life of Ryan on MTV, a look into the life of teen skateboarding pro Ryan Sheckler, and TLC's Livin' for the Apocalypse, which profiled preppers preparing for a coming apocalypse. Others include The Cassadee Pope Project on CMT, Sanya’s Glam and Gold on WE tv, Mountain Movers on National Geographic Channel, Beverly's Full House on OWN, Candy Girls on E!, and the special Dev for MTV.

== Filmography ==
- Barely Famous on VH1
- Meet the Smiths on TBS
- Rev Run's Sunday Suppers on Cooking Channel
- The Cassadee Pope Project on CMT
- Sanya's Glam & Gold on We TV
- Mountain Movers on National Geographic Channel
- Dev on MTV
- Beverly's Full House on OWN: Oprah Winfrey Network
- Tia & Tamera on Style Network
- Livin' for the Apocalypse on TLC
- Harry Loves Lisa on TV Land
- Life of Ryan on MTV
- Run's House on MTV
- Daddy's Girls on MTV
- Candy Girls on E!
