= Tia and Tamera =

Tia and Tamara may refer to:

- Sister, Sister (TV series), a television sitcom starring Tia and Tamera Mowry.
- Actresses Tia Mowry and Tamera Mowry.
- The reality series Tia & Tamera
