= Psych 9 =

- Directed by: Andrew Shortell
- Written by: Lawrence Robinson
- Produced by: Andrew Shortell
- Starring: Sara Foster; Cary Elwes; Michael Biehn
- Cinematography: Shane Daley
- Edited by: Nick McCahearty
- Music by: James Edward Baker
- Distributed by: Green Card Pictures; Lionsgate; Ghost House Underground
- Release date: May 7, 2010 (United Kingdom)
- Running time: 98 minutes
- Countries: United States; Czech Republic
- Language: English
- Budget: $5 million

Psych: 9 is a 2010 American-Czech horror film directed by Andrew Shortell. It stars Sara Foster and Michael Biehn.

== Plot ==
While dealing with her own mental issues, Roslyn takes the night shift at a recently closed hospital's psych ward. As she experiences possibly supernatural phenomena, she comes to suspect that her husband, Cole, is a serial killer active in the area.

== Cast ==
- Sara Foster as Roslyn
- Cary Elwes as Dr. Clement
- Michael Biehn as Det. Marling
- Gabriel Mann as Cole
- Colleen Camp as Beth

== Production ==
Shooting took place in Prague.

== Release ==
Psych 9 played in the UK in May 2010 and at Screamfest Horror Film Festival on October 12. It was released on DVD and Blu-Ray on February 22, 2011.

== Reception ==
Kim Newman of Empire rated it 2/5 stars and called it "predictable fare with a few good performances". Steve Barton of Dread Central rated it 2/5 stars and wrote, "It's all been done before and done much better". Describing the film's use of haunted house and serial killer tropes, R. L. Shaffer of IGN rated it 4/10 stars and called it "more or less a combination of two half-cocked ideas". In comparing it to a Lifetime made-for-cable film, Peter Brown of Shock Till You Drop criticized the amount of time spent on back story and concluded that the film is too illogical and clichéd. Annie Riordan of Brutal as Hell called it "stunningly unscary and totally nonsensical".
