= Ingrid Nilsen =

American make-up artist and YouTuber

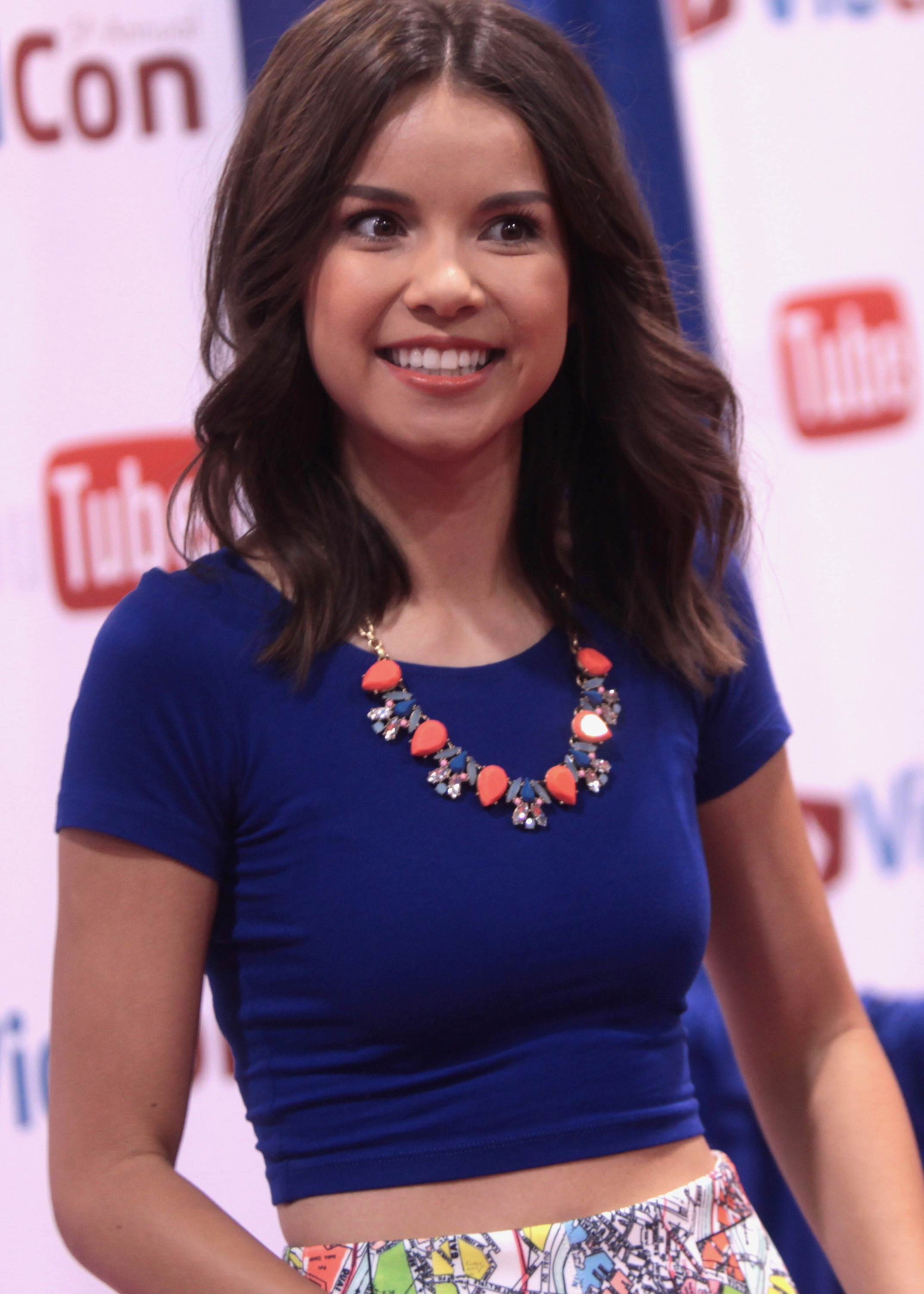
- Nilsen at VidCon, June 2014
- Born: February 2, 1989 (age 37); Rowland Heights, California, U.S.
- Occupations: Businesswoman; YouTube beauty guru; TV hostess; makeup artist; vlogger

YouTube information
- Channel: ingridnilsen
- Years active: 2009–2020
- Genres: Beauty & Style
- Subscribers: 3.46 million
- Views: 395 million
- Last updated: April 23, 2026

Ingrid Nilsen (born February 2, 1989) is an American influencer and YouTuber from Rowland Heights, California. She is the co-founder and Chief Creative Officer of The New Savant.

== Career ==
Nilsen's interview with President Obama

Nilsen began a YouTube channel with the name Missglamorazzi on October 23, 2009, because she wanted to share her feeling of confidence with other people and push herself to overcome her fear of public speaking. She told herself to do something that scared her, and creating a YouTube channel fell under that category for her. In her videos, she covers topics such as fashion, lifestyle, and make-up.

Nilsen also maintains a second channel on YouTube entitled "TheGridMonster" on which she posts her vlogs and more candid content.

In mid-2014, Nilsen began working with CoverGirl, becoming the first YouTube personality to represent the brand.

In late 2014, Nilsen became a judge on the reality television show Project Runway: Threads. At the 2014 Teen Choice Awards and 2015 Teen Choice Awards, Nilsen was nominated for Choice Web Star: Fashion/Beauty.

On January 15, 2016, Nilsen interviewed Barack Obama in a livestream hosted at the White House. She raised questions about the future of terrorism in the United States, taxation of feminine hygiene products, and discrimination against LGBT+ people. Nilsen also asked Obama to share the story behind an item of personal significance during the interview, to which Obama showed a series of small totems, stating each one reminds him "of all the different people [he's] met along the way".

In March 2016, Nilsen was named one of the United Nations Change Ambassadors to the intergovernmental organization along with six other female YouTube creators. The UN Change Ambassadors focused on the global fight for gender equality, one of the UN's 17 Sustainable Development Goals established that year.

In mid-2016, Nilsen was named one of the SuperSoul100, Oprah Winfrey and OWN's list of innovators and visionaries aligned on a mission to move humanity forward.

In July 2016, Nilsen, Do Something, and U by Kotex launched Power To The Period, the first nationwide period product drive. The campaign encouraged participants to run product drives for unopened tampons, pads, and panty liners that were then donated to local homeless shelters. As of September 2016, Power to the Period had donated almost 240,000-period products.

In October 2016, Nilsen was included on OUT magazine's OUT100 list.

On December 4, 2016, The Trevor Project awarded Nilsen the Trevor Digital Innovator Award. "With a powerful social presence, Ingrid has used technology for the better and built a platform and voice to advocate for equality," said Abbe Land, executive director and CEO of The Trevor Project. "She is a role model of her generation and truly is a beacon of hope. She continues to push boundaries and believes in the mission of The Trevor Project, making her the perfect fit for the award."

In February 2017, Nilsen and Shiseido-owned bareMinerals announced a partnership, and Nilsen became the face of the brand's two best-selling foundations. The partnership was one of the biggest deals between a beauty brand and an influencer to date.

In June 2019, Nilsen partnered with a nonprofit It Gets Better for a new campaign. Nilsen led #TheirStory campaign which asked LGBTQ+ members and their allies to share stories about inspirational figures via online videos. This campaign was covered on Instagram, TikTok, and YouTube. She attempted to raise $50,000.

On June 30, 2020, Nilsen announced through her YouTube channel she would no longer be uploading to YouTube.

Nilsen now co-owns and runs the artisanal candle company The New Savant.

== Personal life ==
Ingrid is of Norwegian descent on her father's side and Thai on her mother's side. On June 9, 2015, Nilsen uploaded a video on her YouTube channel, in which she came out as lesbian.

Nilsen came out as lesbian in 2015. From September 2015 to January 2016, Nilsen dated fellow YouTuber Hannah Hart. Nilsen then dated Erica Anderson, announcing their relationship on Instagram in 2018. As of 2025, Nilsen confirmed a relationship with American professional soccer player Meghan Klingenberg, on Instagram.

== Awards and nominations ==
Year	Nominated	Award	Result
2014	Teen Choice Awards	Teen Choice Award for Choice Web Star: Fashion/Beauty	Nominated
2014	Streamy Award	2014 Streamy Awards Best Beauty Program	Won
2015	Teen Choice Awards	Teen Choice Award for Choice Web Star: Fashion/Beauty	Nominated
2015	Streamy Award	2015 Streamy Awards Best Beauty Program	Nominated
2016	Good Housekeeping	2016 Awesome Women Awards	#11
