= Nobody Wants This =

2024 American romantic comedy-drama TV series

- Genre: Romantic comedy; Comedy drama
- Created by: Erin Foster
- Showrunners: Erin Foster; Craig DiGregorio; Jenni Konner; Bruce Eric Kaplan
- Starring: Kristen Bell; Adam Brody; Justine Lupe; Timothy Simons; Jackie Tohn
- Composer: Duncan Blickenstaff
- Country of origin: United States
- Original language: English
- No. of seasons: 3
- No. of episodes: 30

Production
- Executive producers: Erin Foster; Craig DiGregorio; Jack Burditt; Kristen Bell; Oly Obst; Sara Foster; Danielle Stokdyk; Jeff Morton; Greg Mottola; Steven Levitan; Jenni Konner; Bruce Eric Kaplan; Nora Silver; Lindsay Golder
- Cinematography: Adrian Peng Correia; Wesley Cardino
- Editors: Maura Corey; Keenan Hiett; Jen Rosenthal; Catherine Cloutier; Varun Viswanath; David Dean; Taichi Erskine; Michael Scotti Jr.; Dipa Gandhi
- Running time: 21–31 minutes
- Production companies: Fatigue Sisters Productions; Double Wide Productions; Levitan Productions; Mr. D Productions; 3 Arts Entertainment; Dunshire Productions; 20th Television; Jenni Konner; BEK Industries

Original release
- Network: Netflix
- Release: September 26, 2024 – present

Nobody Wants This (stylized as Nobody Wants This.) is an American romantic comedy television series created by Erin Foster which premiered on Netflix on September 26, 2024 and stars Kristen Bell, Adam Brody, Justine Lupe, Timothy Simons and Jackie Tohn.

Nobody Wants This focuses on the unlikely relationship between an outspoken, agnostic woman and a handsome young Jewish rabbi.

The series was met with positive reviews from critics and also received several accolades, with five nominations at the Primetime Emmy Awards, for Outstanding Comedy Series and outstanding acting for both Bell and Brody.

In November 2025, the series was renewed for a third season, which premiered on October 22, 2026. In November 2026, the series was renewed for a fourth season.

== Premise ==
Nobody Wants This follows the love-at-first-sight relationship between a young American rabbi, Noah (Adam Brody), and an irascible agnostic woman, Joanne (Kristen Bell). Joanne co-hosts a podcast, with her sister, Morgan (Justine Lupe) about relationships; Noah, who hopes to be promoted to chief rabbi of his synagogue, has just ended his long term relationship with a Jewish woman.

== Cast and characters ==
=== Main ===
- Kristen Bell as Joanne Elizabeth Williams, a sex and dating podcaster
- Adam Brody as Noah Roklov, a rabbi introduced to Joanne by her best friend Ashley
- Justine Lupe as Morgan Williams, Joanne's younger sister and podcast co-host
- Timothy Simons as Sasha Roklov, Noah's older brother
- Jackie Tohn as Esther Roklov (seasons 2–present; recurring season 1), Sasha's wife

=== Recurring ===
- Stephanie Faracy as Lynn Williams, Joanne and Morgan's mother
- Tovah Feldshuh as Bina Roklov, Noah and Sasha's mother
- Paul Ben-Victor as Ilan Roklov, Noah and Sasha's father
- Michael Hitchcock as Henry Williams, Joanne and Morgan's father who recently came out as gay and is separated from Lynn
- Emily Arlook as Rebecca, Noah's Jewish almost fiancée
- Sherry Cola as Ashley, Joanne's best friend and podcast agent
- Shiloh Bearman as Miriam Roklov, Sasha and Esther's daughter
- Stephen Tobolowsky as Rabbi Cohen (seasons 1–2), the head rabbi and Noah's boss at the Temple Chai
- D'Arcy Carden as Ryann (seasons 1–2), Joanne's friend
- Arian Moayed as Andy (season 2), Morgan's new boyfriend who used to be her therapist
- Sarah Silverman as Rabbi Eden (season 3), a rabbi at the Temple Chai and Joanne's Judaism teacher
- Andrew Rannells as Sebastian (season 3), Joanne's Judaism classmate at the Temple Chai
- Steven Weber as Julian (season 3), Esther's new love interest
- Avan Jogia as Travis (season 3), Joanne's ex boyfriend

=== Notable guest stars ===
- Ryan Hansen as Kyle, a former fling of Joanne's
- Leslie Grossman as Rabbi Shira
- Alex Karpovsky as Big Noah (season 2), the head rabbi that Rabbi Cohen chooses over Noah Roklov
- Miles Fowler as Lenny (season 2), Noah's friend
- Leighton Meester as Abby (season 2), Joanne's former middle school friend who is now a mom influencer on Instagram
- Seth Rogen as Rabbi Neil (season 2), a reform rabbi who offers Noah a job at his congregation Temple Ahava
- Kate Berlant as Rabbi Cami (season 2)
- Lauren Weedman as Lois (season 2), Morgan and Andy's couples therapist

== Episodes ==
=== Series overview ===
Season	Episodes	Originally released
1	10	September 26, 2024
2	10	October 23, 2025
3	10	October 22, 2026

=== Season 1 (2024) ===
No. overall	No. in season	Title	Directed by	Written by	Original release date	Prod. code
1	1	"Pilot"	Greg Mottola	Erin Foster	September 26, 2024	1VZN01
Noah is a rabbi who ends his relationship with his Jewish girlfriend, Rebecca. Joanne is an agnostic woman who runs a relationship podcast with her sister Morgan. Sparks fly when the two are introduced at a dinner party hosted by Ashley, Noah's neighbor and Joanne's agent. Joanne enters Noah's synagogue to hear him give a sermon about changing the course of one's life.
2	2	"A Shiksa Walks Into a Temple"	Greg Mottola	Erin Foster	September 26, 2024	1VZN02
Noah attempts to speak to Joanne, but is hindered by members of the congregation. He and his brother Sasha join Morgan and Joanne for a drink. Noah and Joanne discuss privacy and uncomfortable issues, but are interrupted by the arrival of Sasha's wife, who yells about Noah's relationship with Rebecca. Noah's family confronts him about his flirtation with Joanne; Joanne and Morgan go to a meeting about their podcast acquisition. Noah invites Joanne to dinner to clarify his relationship status; despite mutually declaring they are just friends, the two kiss.
3	3	"Either Aura"	Karen Maine	Jane Becker & Lindsay Golder	September 26, 2024	1VZN03
Joanne is giddy about the kiss, though she worries that Noah did not respond to her text; Morgan wonders if she and Noah are mismatched. Meanwhile, Noah arrives at the hospital to see Rebecca, who has broken her wrist, and is accosted by both their families about his relationship with Joanne. Joanne, worried she is not a good enough person to date a religious leader, stops to help a dog. She arrives home to find Noah on her doorstep.
4	4	"Obliterated"	Hannah Fidell	Teleplay by : Ron Weiner; Story by : Ron Weiner & Noelle Valdivia	September 26, 2024	1VZN06
Joanne and Noah separately prepare for their first date. During the date Morgan tasks Joanne with picking up the dildo developed by a podcast guest, and she winds up taking Noah to pick it up, but they run into a board member of Noah's temple with his mistress. Meanwhile, Sasha helps his daughter navigate a crisis with her crush. Later, Noah makes Joanne dinner. He admits that he wants a real relationship and she admits she is afraid of driving him away. The two have sex.
5	5	"My Friend Joanne"	Oz Rodriguez	Neel Shah & Pat Regan	September 26, 2024	1VZN05
Joanne and Noah's first trip together is derailed when Noah is asked to cover for his boss at a Jewish camp in Ojai; Joanne leaves Morgan to handle a dinner with Spotify representatives. While picking up Joanne's laptop from Noah's, Morgan and Sasha bond over being the "loser siblings". After Noah's boss Rabbi Cohen arrives, he asks Joanne to skip his Torah study so he will not be seen with a non-Jewish woman. Upset, Joanne leaves to attend the dinner, where she and Morgan charm the executives. Noah arrives, apologizes to Joanne, and asks her to be his girlfriend.
6	6	"The Ick"	Karen Maine	Jane Becker	September 26, 2024	1VZN04
Morgan and Ashley are concerned that Joanne's new relationship is negatively affecting their podcast. Joanne invites Noah to her and Morgan's watch party, but are unexpectedly joined by their parents and their father's new boyfriend. Noah tries too hard to impress Joanne's family, which turns her off. In the ensuing awkwardness, Noah clarifies that he would have to have a Jewish wife. Noah goes outside to assure Joanne that he is on her side and she admits that she likes him. The two discuss "the ick" on the podcast. Meanwhile, Sasha successfully asks for a higher position at his father's company.
7	7	"WAGS"	Oz Rodriguez	Lindsay Golder	September 26, 2024	1VZN07
Noah hits it off with Joanne's friend group. In turn Joanne comes to Noah's basketball game, where she successfully charms his teammates but is snubbed by their wives and girlfriends, who are friends with Rebecca. Noah gives Joanne advice on how to win them over during the next game. Morgan also arrives and softens Esther with alcohol. Rebecca spots Noah and Joanne together. Later, Joanne finds some mementos of Rebecca in Noah's things.
8	8	"Rebecca's Box"	Hannah Fidell	Teleplay by : Ryann Werner; Story by : Ryann Werner & Ron Weiner	September 26, 2024	1VZN08
Noah assures Joanne that he will return the box of Rebecca's things. Rabbi Cohen tells Noah that he wants Noah to succeed him as head rabbi, but encourages him to pursue a Jewish woman. Noah hosts a havdalah dinner with Joanne, inviting Sasha and Esther. Joanne wins favor by convincing their daughter Miriam of their parents' favored bat mitzvah theme. Meanwhile Morgan, concerned that Joanne is changing too much, strikes a conversation with Rebecca at a bar. She claims to Joanne that Noah and Rebecca have been talking behind Joanne's back. Joanne confronts Morgan about the lie and accuses her sister of being jealous of Joanne's healthy relationship. Noah asks her if she would consider converting to Judaism.
9	9	"My Girl Bina"	Lawrence Trilling	Barbie Adler & Niki Schwartz-Wright	September 26, 2024	1VZN09
Joanne, still on the outs with Morgan, prepares to meet Noah's parents Ilan and Bina. Joanne commits a faux pas by giving them a box with prosciutto. Esther tells Sasha that Rebecca had recognized Morgan and lied to her. At brunch, Bina verbally disapproves of Joanne's podcast and lack of religion. Joanne tries to patch things up with Bina and catches her eating the prosciutto. She seemingly wins Bina over by hiding this from the others, but afterwards Bina tells Joanne she will not end up with Noah.
10	10	"Bat Mitzvah Crashers"	Lawrence Trilling	Craig DiGregorio	September 26, 2024	1VZN10
Joanne fakes sickness to get out of attending Miriam's bat mitzvah. Sasha calls Morgan while she is with Joanne and tells her about Rebecca's lie; the sisters make up and Morgan encourages Joanne to attend. The sisters crash the party and Joanne tells Noah that she wants to convert to Judaism. Esther realizes Sasha and Morgan have been talking. Joanne talks to Rebecca and realizes the responsibility of being wife to the head rabbi. She admits to Noah that she is not ready to convert and tries to break up with him as he cannot have both her and the head rabbi job, but he follows her. Noah agrees with her and kisses her.

=== Season 2 (2025) ===
No. overall	No. in season	Title	Directed by	Written by	Original release date	Prod. code
11	1	"Dinner Party"	Hannah Fidell	Erin Foster	October 23, 2025	2VZN01
12	2	"Leave It At the Tree"	Hannah Fidell	Teleplay by : Lawrence Dai & Mahtub Zare Mochanloo; Story by : Lawrence Dai & Jena Friedman & Mahtub Zare Mochanloo	October 23, 2025	2VZN02
13	3	"The Unethical Therapist"	Jesse Peretz	Ryann Werner	October 23, 2025	2VZN03
14	4	"Valentine's Day"	Jamie Babbit	Sarah Heyward	October 23, 2025	2VZN04
15	5	"Abby Loves Smoothies"	Jesse Peretz	Lindsay Golder	October 23, 2025	2VZN05
16	6	"Anything Can Happen"	Heather Jack	Sarah Heyward & Megan Mazer	October 23, 2025	2VZN06
17	7	"When You Know, You Know"	Heather Jack	Bruce Eric Kaplan	October 23, 2025	2VZN07
18	8	"A Better Rabbi"	Jamie Babbit	Bruce Eric Kaplan	October 23, 2025	2VZN08
19	9	"Crossroads"	Richard Shepard	Jenni Konner & Megan Mazer	October 23, 2025	2VZN09
20	10	"When Noah Met Joanne"	Richard Shepard	Erin Foster	October 23, 2025	2VZN10

=== Season 3 (2026) ===
No. overall	No. in season	Title	Directed by	Written by	Original release date	Prod. code
21	1	"It's Perfect"	Karen Maine	Erin Foster & Ryann Werner	October 22, 2026	3VZN01
22	2	"Daddy's Home"	Karen Maine	Lindsay Golder	October 22, 2026	3VZN02
23	3	"Housewarming"	Natalia Anderson	Liz Elverenli	October 22, 2026	3VZN03
24	4	"Brian's Wedding"	Natalia Anderson	Erin Foster & Ryann Werner	October 22, 2026	3VZN04
25	5	"The Love Card"	Heather Jack	Bruce Eric Kaplan	October 22, 2026	3VZN05
Following Noah's proposal, Joanne and Noah start planning their perfect wedding, but must reconcile their ideas with Bina's more traditional ones. Sasha struggles to find common ground with a woman from the apps, and she leaves him in the middle of their third date. However, Sasha still ends up getting lucky with the waitress. Esther feels a spark with her client Julian during her showing of a house, and they kiss. Trying to drum up the motivation to finish her book proposal, Morgan attempts to join a writer's meeting but winds up finding inspiration from the tarot card reader next door. As Morgan explains her newfound enthusiasm to Sasha that night, Lynn susses out that Sasha has a crush on Morgan.
26	6	"Heatwave"	Kate Sullivan	Megan Mazer	October 22, 2026	3VZN06
In the middle of a heat wave, Joanne and Noah scope out the perfect venue for their wedding but discover it can only hold seventy-five guests which would mean cutting many members of their friends and family. Since the venue is so popular, they are given twenty-four hours to whittle down their guest list before the venue goes to another couple. After, Joanne and Noah run into Esther who invites them to her first date with Julian, and the four of them awkwardly discuss guest list etiquette before the power goes out in the city. Despite needing to finalize their guest list, the heat wave and a lack of AC due to the power outage lead to Joanne and Noah hosting an impromptu pool party where they come to the realization that the venue will not work for them because they are lucky to have so many people who care about them in their lives. Morgan discovers that her book proposal was rejected and is devastated. Sasha comforts her, and when she finds out she is invited to be a guest on "Watch What Happens Live" in New York, Morgan asks him to come with her.
27	7	"Watch What Happens"	Richard Shepard	Jenni Konner & Megan Mazer	October 22, 2026	3VZN07
For one night, Joanne and Noah turn their phones off in favor of getting high and spending time alone together without anyone bothering them. Meanwhile, Morgan and Sasha land in New York for her appearance on "What What Happens Live". The hotel front desk receptionist is a huge fan of Morgan and credits the "Make Them" slogan with her getting engaged. As a thank-you, the receptionist upgrades their hotel room to a luxury suite; however, when they enter their room, Morgan and Sasha discover there's only one bed. Both of them panic-call their siblings to vent about their growing attraction to one another, but neither Noah nor Joanne answers. When Morgan realizes that she is wearing the same outfit as a previous guest on the show, Sasha takes her shopping and insists on paying for her dress when she finds the right one. After Morgan kills it with her performance on "Watch What Happens Live", she and Sasha celebrate with drinks and dinner, getting closer and closer. At the end of the evening, Morgan and Sasha almost kiss but stop themselves because neither of them wants to ruin their friendship. However, when they return to their suite, they end up sleeping together.
28	8	"One in a Million"	Jaffar Mahmood	Teleplay by : Ryann Werner; Story by : Lindsay Golder & Candice Horde & Mahtub Zare Mochanloo and Ryann Werner	October 22, 2026	3VZN08
After their night together, Sasha is upset when he finds Morgan has taken an earlier flight home and decides to move out. Morgan and Lynn have a heart-to-heart where Lynn encourages Morgan to pursue a relationship with Sasha despite her reservations. After Bina talks up having the wedding in her backyard, Joanne decides that she and Noah will be married there, but when Noah insists on father-daughter and mother-son dances, Joanne balks, not wanting to dance with Henry. Esther learns that Julian has a date with someone else and attempts to unearth the identity of the "other woman" with Rebecca's help only to discover they accidentally stalked his cleaning woman. Esther eventually admits to Julian that she doesn't want him to date other people, Julian admits he cancelled his date, and they become exclusive. Initially upset with her sister for hooking up with Sasha, Joanne realizes that Morgan actually loves him and advises her to tell him. Morgan pours her heart out to Sasha, saying that she wants to try with him, but he rejects her because he is in a tenuous emotional place due to both his marriage blowing up and Morgan's treatment of him after their night together. Joanne and Noah get into an argument after Noah goes behind Joanne's back to ask Henry if he would consider the father-daughter dance, but they quickly reconcile with Joanne telling Noah he should still do the mother-son dance since it's important to him. Joanne then reveals to Noah that Morgan and Sasha slept together.
29	9	"Last Christmas"	Jaffar Mahmood	Sarah Heyward	October 22, 2026	3VZN09
A flashback from several years ago shows Travis asking Joanne if he can join Christmas dinner with her family which thrills her. In the present, Joanne gears up for her last Christmas since she will have converted to Judaism by the next time the holidays roll around, and Noah promises to help make it a special. Unfortunately, Morgan is miserable after Sasha rejected her and won't leave her bed, Lynn is ignoring Joanne because she is angry that the wedding will be held in Bina's backyard not hers, and Henry's Christmas party decor is lackluster. To make Joanne happy, Noah talks to each of her family members to see if he can turn things around, but to no avail. In the past, Joanne is at a bakery picking up a gigantic gingerbread house but can't find her wallet to pay, so she agrees to go on a New Year's cruise date with the cashier in order to take it home. On her way out, a man runs into her then apologizes, and it's revealed to be Noah before they officially met. In the present, Noah takes Joanne to the same bakery with the same cashier to pick up a gingerbread house, but since Joanne never went on that date, the cashier tells them he gave it away. Defeated, Noah and Joanne go to Henry's house to find a Christmas miracle: the house is fully decorated complete with the gingerbread house the cashier unknowingly sold to Henry, Lynn has forgiven Joanne in exchange for becoming a flowergirl in their wedding, and Morgan has made an appearance though mostly because she knew Sasha had been invited. In the past, Travis tells Joanne he will not be coming to Christmas despite the fact he invited himself which devastates her, but the Christmas atmosphere buoys her spirits, and while she and Morgan are relating their horrific date stories to their amused parents, they are inspired to start their podcast. In the present, Morgan chews Sasha out for trying to be friendly but not actually wanting to be with her, and she tells Noah that if Sasha is coming to the wedding, she will not be attending.
30	10	"The Plunge"	Richard Shepard	Erin Foster & Ryann Werner	October 22, 2026	3VZN10
Noah and Joanne's wedding invitation goes out even as they try to keep Bina from taking over their wedding plans. Morgan tells Joanne she will not be making it to Joanne's mikveh, a ritual water immersion and the last step in her conversion, because she cannot see Sasha. Esther drops by Sasha's with a pillow for Miri, but after seeing the changes Sasha has made to his home, they sleep together. Noah and Joanne use Morgan's "Make Them" philosophy against her when they trap Sasha and Morgan in the back of their car on the way to the mikveh to force them to talk to one another. At the beach house, tensions erupt when Lynn reveals to Esther that Sasha and Morgan slept together. Esther then tells Morgan she slept with Sasha, and everyone, including both sets of parents, starts arguing. Noah, Joanne, and Rabbi Eden sneak away to the beach to perform the mikveh, and Joanne immerses herself in the ocean. Afterward, as Noah glances over at their families who are still squabbling in the beach house, he asks Rabbi Eden if she will conduct the wedding ceremony on the beach right then. After marshaling wedding rings and a random witness, Rabbi Eden marries them at sunset.

== Production ==
Season 1 poster featuring Adam Brody and Kristen Bell

=== Development ===
On March 1, 2023, it was announced that Netflix had greenlit a comedy series created by Erin Foster based loosely on Foster's real-life experiences. It was also announced that Kristen Bell would have a main role in the series and serve as co-executive producer along with Steven Levitan and Foster.

On May 15, 2024, the series was given the title Nobody Wants This.

The series is executive-produced by Foster, Kristen Bell, Steven Levitan, Craig DiGregorio, Sara Foster, Danielle Stokdyk, Oly Obst and Josh Lieberman for 3 Arts Entertainment. Production companies involved with this series are Steven Levitan Productions, 3 Arts Entertainment, and 20th Television.

On October 10, 2024, Netflix renewed the series for a second season, with Jenni Konner and Bruce Eric Kaplan as new showrunners, replacing Foster and DiGregorio, who were the first season's showrunners. Filming for the second season began on March 3, 2025 and concluded on May 12, 2025.

On November 4, 2025, Netflix renewed the series for a third season. Filming for the third season began on March 24, 2026 and concluded on May 21, 2026.

On November 6, 2026, Netflix renewed the series for a fourth season.

=== Casting ===
In the initial series announcement in March 2023, it was announced that Bell was starring in the series. In April 2023, it was announced that Adam Brody would star in the series as Noah, and Bell's character would be called Joanne. In January 2024, it was announced that Justine Lupe and Timothy Simons had joined the main cast as Morgan and Sasha, and Jackie Tohn, Michael Hitchcock, Paul Ben-Victor, Sherry Cola, Shiloh Bearman, Stephanie Faracy, Tania Raymonde, and Tovah Feldshuh had joined as recurring cast. In May 2024, it was announced that Emily Arlook had replaced Tania Raymonde in the role of Rebecca. In February 2025, Tohn was promoted as a series regular while Leighton Meester and Miles Fowler were cast to guest star for the second season. In March 2025, Arian Moayed and Alex Karpovsky joined the cast in recurring capacities for the second season. In September 2025, Seth Rogen and Kate Berlant were cast to guest star for the second season.

=== Soundtrack ===
The first season features songs such as Dua Lipa's "Levitating", Rihanna's "Love on the Brain", and Olivia Rodrigo's "Obsessed" and "Brutal". The soundtrack for the second season consists of original songs from a variety of genres, and was assembled by Simon Tikhman, who is married to Foster.

Nobody Wants This (Soundtrack from the Netflix Series) track listing
No.	Title	Writer(s)	Producer(s)	Length
1.	"In the Dark" (Selena Gomez)	Selena Gomez; Andrew Watt; Louis Bell; Ali Tamposi; Justin Tranter; Henry Russell Walter	Watt; Louis Bell; Cirkut	3:05
2.	"You've Got Another Thing Coming" (Teddy Swims)	Teddy Swims; Jeff Gitelman; Kevin Theodore; Nathalia Marshall; Romans	Jeff Gitelman	2:59
3.	"Who's Your Boyfriend" (acoustic; Royel Otis)	Royel Maddell; Otis Pavlovic; Blake Slatkin; Amy Allen	Blake Slatkin	2:54
4.	"Heart Letting Go" (Chris Stapleton)	Chris Stapleton; Alan Anderson	Chris Stapleton	3:27
5.	"If the World Burns Down" (Kacey Musgraves)	Kacey Musgraves; Daniel Tashian; Ian Fitchuk	Kacey Musgraves; Daniel Tashian; Ian Fitchuk	3:52
6.	"That's What I'll Be" (Baylee Lynn)	AJ Pruis; Bayley Lynn; Jenna Shuffler; Mia Mantia	AJ Pruis	3:21
7.	"Palomino" (Finneas)	Finneas O'Connell; Matthew Fildey; David Marinelli; Lucy Healey; Aron Forbes; Miles Kottak	Finneas	3:10
8.	"Your Girl" (Towa Bird)	Annie Schindel; Julio Tavarez; Patrick Wimberly; Reneé Rapp; Towa Bird	Patrick Wimberly	4:19
9.	"My House" (Alessia Cara)	Alessia Cara; Jakob Hazell; Svante Halldin; Jacob Kasher Hindlin	Mike Elizondo	3:33
10.	"Saddle Again" (Role Model)	Gabe Simon; Carrie K; Noah Conrad; Tucker Pillsbury	Gabe Simon; Carrie K	2:56
11.	"Climate Change" (Just Jayne)	Johnny Simpson; Jillian Steele; Cole Miracle; Maya J'an Brown	Johnny Simpson	3:18
12.	"This Version of Us" (Ella Langley)	Ella Langley; Jordan Schmidt; Jon Nite; Zach Kale	Jason Haag; Jordan Schmidt	3:10
13.	"What" (Benee)	John Hill; Matt Cohn; Matthew Castellanos; Stella Rose Bennett	John Hill; Matt Cohn	2:58
14.	"Reach You" (Portugal. The Man)	Jeff Bhasker; John Gourley; John Ryan; Homer Steinweiss; Steph Jones; Tobias Jesso Jr.; Benjamin Ruttner; James Patterson	Jeff Bhasker; the Knocks	2:57
15.	"Dancing in the Smoke" (Giveon)	Hidde Ament; Giveon Evans; Magnus August Høiberg; Jasper Harris; Alexander Goldblatt	Cashmere Cat; Hidde Ament; Jasper Harris; Alexander Goldblatt	3:42
16.	"Melodies" (Dermot Kennedy)	Carl Falk; Savan Kotecha; Peter Svensson; Lewis Capaldi	Carl Falk; Savan Kotecha	2:37
17.	"Homesick" (Cuco)	Omar Banos; Joshua Gailer Crocker; Pablo Drexler Serrano	Joshua Gailer Crocker	2:32
18.	"Bite My Tongue" (Cassandra Coleman)	Cassandra Coleman; Jonathan Class	Jonathan Class	3:38
19.	"Nobody Wants This Score Suite" (Duncan Blickenstaff)	Duncan Blickenstaff	Duncan Blickenstaff	2:45

The soundtrack for the third season was announced in October 2026, featuring Miley Cyrus, Ellie Goulding, Maisie Peters and others.

Nobody Wants This Season 3 track listing
No.	Title	Writer(s)	Length
1.	"ILoveYou"	Elle Coves
2.	"Romanticize the Dive"	Metric
3.	"Cold-Blooded"	Miley Cyrus
4.	"My Kinda Love"	Stella Lefty; Bailey Zimmerman
5.	"Hands on Me"	Maisie Peters
6.	"Click Click Flash"	J Balvin
7.	"Flights"	Noga Erez
8.	"Obsession"	Mimi Webb
9.	"Home Tonight"	Bella Kay
10.	"Love Sick"	Ravyn Lenae
11.	"Getting Over U"	Alyssa Grace
12.	"Set Me Free"	Cameron Whitcomb
13.	"Gorgeous"	Jessie Murph
14.	"Say When"	Megan Moroney
15.	"You" (demo)	Cyrus
16.	"Pray for Me"	Ellie Goulding
17.	"Nobody Wants This Score Suite"	Duncan Blickenstaff

== Release ==
Nobody Wants This premiered on Netflix on September 26, 2024. The second season premiered on October 23, 2025. The third season premiered on October 22, 2026.

== Reception ==
=== Critical response ===
Critical response of Nobody Wants This
Season	Rotten Tomatoes	Metacritic
1	95% (56 reviews)	73 (27 reviews)
2	80% (56 reviews)	64 (22 reviews)
3	83% (23 reviews)	75 (8 reviews)

==== Season 1 ====
On the review aggregator website Rotten Tomatoes, the first season holds a 95% approval rating for the first season with an average of rated reviews of 7.8/10, based on 56 critic reviews. The website's critics consensus reads, "Contrary to its title, Nobody Wants This proves to be a welcome binge thanks to Kristen Bell and Adam Brody's irresistible chemistry and some thoughtful considerations of interfaith romance." Metacritic, which uses a weighted average, assigned a score of 73 out of 100 based on 27 critics, indicating "generally favorable" reviews.

Glamour senior editor Jessica Radloff published an essay stating that the show's Jewish characters "come off as controlling, marriage-hungry women who want to plan dinner parties and alienate anyone who doesn't share those same dreams." She also took issue with the use of shiksa in the first episode "Pilot". In response, Foster has stated "I think we need positive Jewish stories right now. I think it's interesting when people focus on, 'Oh, this is a stereotype of Jewish people,' when you have a rabbi as the lead. A hot, cool, young rabbi who smokes weed. That's the antithesis of how people view a Jewish rabbi, right?"

The Independent's Kate Rosseinsky gave the show a score of 4/5, claiming that although there are a "few obvious tropes", there are still many less predictable comedic moments that can be "sometimes hilariously, slightly relatable." The Guardian TV critic Lucy Mangan rated the show 5/5 stars, stating, "Everybody will want this". She feels that there are real emotional stakes and that the majorly opposing cultures of the two main characters are "genuine problems," and although they are blocking paths of happiness with no clear answers, she will be with them to the bitter end.

==== Season 2 ====
On Rotten Tomatoes, the second season has a 80% approval rating , with an average of rated reviews of 6.5/10, based on 56 critic reviews. The website's critics consensus states, "In its second outing, Nobody Wants This' sharp humor and warmly chaotic ensemble keep it an engaging and emotionally observant rom-com that still charms even as it stumbles." On Metacritic, it has a weighted average score of 64 out of 100 based on 22 critics, indicating "generally favorable" reviews.

==== Season 3 ====
On Rotten Tomatoes, the third season holds a 83% approval rating with an average of rated reviews of 7.3/10, based on 23 critic reviews. The website's critics consensus reads, "With a hot rabbi, an interfaith relationship, and the little matter of making love last, Nobody Wants This keeps its romantic misadventures charmingly complicated." On Metacritic, it has a weighted average score of 75 out of 100 based on 8 critics, indicating "generally favorable" reviews.

=== Accolades ===
Year	Award	Category	Nominee(s)	Result	Ref.
2024	Hollywood Music in Media Awards	Best Music Supervision – Television	Este Haim & Zachary Daws	Nominated	
2025	American Cinema Editors Awards	Best Edited Single-Camera Comedy Series	Maura Corey (for "Pilot")	Nominated	
2025	Critics' Choice Television Awards	Best Comedy Series	Nobody Wants This	Nominated	
2025	Critics' Choice Television Awards	Best Actor in a Comedy Series	Adam Brody	Won	
2025	Critics' Choice Television Awards	Best Actress in a Comedy Series	Kristen Bell	Nominated	
2025	Golden Globe Awards	Best Television Series – Musical or Comedy	Nobody Wants This	Nominated	
2025	Golden Globe Awards	Best Actor in a Television Series – Musical or Comedy	Adam Brody	Nominated	
2025	Golden Globe Awards	Best Actress in a Television Series – Musical or Comedy	Kristen Bell	Nominated	
2025	Primetime Emmy Awards	Outstanding Comedy Series	Erin Foster, Craig DiGregorio, Jack Burditt, Kristen Bell, Oly Obst, Sara Foster, Danielle Stokdyk, Jeff Morton, Steven Levitan, Lindsay Golder, Jane Becker, Ron Weiner, Neel Shah, and Noelle Valdivia	Nominated	
2025	Primetime Emmy Awards	Outstanding Lead Actor in a Comedy Series	Adam Brody	Nominated	
2025	Primetime Emmy Awards	Outstanding Lead Actress in a Comedy Series	Kristen Bell	Nominated	
2025	Satellite Awards	Best Actor in a Comedy or Musical Series	Adam Brody	Nominated	
2025	Satellite Awards	Best Actress in a Comedy or Musical Series	Kristen Bell	Nominated	
2025	Screen Actors Guild Awards	Outstanding Performance by a Male Actor in a Comedy Series	Adam Brody	Nominated	
2025	Screen Actors Guild Awards	Outstanding Performance by a Female Actor in a Comedy Series	Kristen Bell	Nominated	
2025	Television Critics Association Awards	Outstanding Achievement in Comedy	Nobody Wants This	Nominated	
2025	Television Critics Association Awards	Outstanding New Program	Nobody Wants This	Nominated	
2026	Critics' Choice Television Awards	Best Comedy Series	Nobody Wants This	Nominated	
2026	Critics' Choice Television Awards	Best Actor in a Comedy Series	Adam Brody	Nominated	
2026	Critics' Choice Television Awards	Best Actress in a Comedy Series	Kristen Bell	Nominated	
2026	Critics' Choice Television Awards	Best Supporting Actor in a Comedy Series	Timothy Simons	Nominated	
2026	Critics' Choice Television Awards	Best Supporting Actress in a Comedy Series	Justine Lupe	Nominated	
2026	Golden Globe Awards	Best Television Series – Musical or Comedy	Nobody Wants This	Nominated	
2026	Golden Globe Awards	Best Actor in a Television Series – Musical or Comedy	Adam Brody	Nominated	
2026	Golden Globe Awards	Best Actress in a Television Series – Musical or Comedy	Kristen Bell	Nominated	
2026	Actor Awards	Outstanding Performance by a Male Actor in a Comedy Series	Adam Brody	Nominated	
2026	Satellite Awards	Best Actor in a Comedy or Musical Series	Adam Brody	Nominated	
2026	Satellite Awards	Best Actress in a Comedy or Musical Series	Kristen Bell	Won	
2026	Primetime Creative Arts Emmy Awards	Outstanding Music Supervision	Manish Raval, Tom Wolfe and Jonathan Leahy (for "When Noah Met Joanne")	Nominated	
2026	Primetime Emmy Awards	Outstanding Comedy Series	Erin Foster, Bruce Eric Kaplan, Kristen Bell, Nora Silver, Jeff Morton, Oly Obst, Sara Foster, Danielle Stokdyk, Steven Levitan, Sarah Heyward, Lindsay Golder, Michael C. Bolton and Andrew Brooks	Nominated	
