= Meet the Smiths =

- Genre: Comedy; Reality
- Starring: Kenny Smith; Gwendolyn Osborne-Smith; Kayla Smith; Monique Green; KJ Smith; Malloy Smith; London Olivia Smith
- Country of origin: United States
- Original language: English
- No. of seasons: 1
- No. of episodes: 6

Production
- Executive producers: Sean Travis; Jason A. Carbone; Kenny Smith; Jeff Altrock; Nick Lee
- Producers: Gwendolyn Osbourne-Smith; Brian B. Ferretti
- Camera setup: Single camera
- Running time: 21 minutes
- Production company: Good Clean Fun

Original release
- Network: TBS
- Release: April 3 – May 8, 2015

Meet the Smiths was a scripted reality television series on TBS. It features NBA on TNT analyst Kenny Smith, The Price Is Right model Gwendolyn Osborne-Smith and their five children. The series was picked up on September 30, 2014, with it to begin airing in Spring 2015. A sneak preview of the show aired February 13, 2015, on TNT and was uploaded to Facebook and the TBS website on March 13, 2015. The series officially premiered on April 3, 2015, on TBS.

== Episodes ==
No.	Title	Original release date	Prod. code	US viewers (thousands)
1	"Step Your Notches Up"	April 3, 2015	101	555
Kenny and Gwendolyn's parenting differences are on full display as they raise their family; Gwen's daughter Monique faces a major life decision.
2	"The 8-Year Itch"	April 10, 2015	102	572
Kenny tries to make good on a botched anniversary, while Gwendolyn sets out to give herself an anniversary gift Kenny never will forget.
3	"Competitive Pedigree"	April 17, 2015	103	596
The Smiths show their competitive side when Gwendolyn challenges Kenny to a foot race, and Malloy tries to learn the importance of sportsmanship.
4	"Letting Go"	April 24, 2015	104	525
Kenny struggles with Monique's newfound college freedom, while London struggles to let go of her prized possession ... the pacifier.
5	"The Zen Detective"	May 1, 2015	105	400
Kenny tries to help Gwendolyn cope with her stress, while Kayla and Monique try to keep Kenny out of their business.
6	"The Honeymoon Ain't Over"	May 8, 2015	106	772
Kenny and Gwendolyn try to put romance back in their relationship. With five kids and an overworked Gwen, this proves more difficult than expected.
