= Vanessa Simmons =

American television personality (born 1983)

- Born: August 5, 1983 (age 43); Laie, Hawaii, United States
- Occupations: Television personality, Actress
- Years active: 2005-present

Vanessa Jean Simmons (born August 5, 1983) is an American television personality and actress. Her family is featured in the MTV reality show Run's House. She was the host and judge of Project Runway: Threads.

== Early life ==
Simmons is the oldest daughter of Joseph Simmons and Valerie Vaughn. She is the older sister to Angela Simmons, Joseph "Jojo" Simmons Jr, Daniel "Diggy" Simmons III, Russell "Russy" Simmons II, Victoria Anne Simmons and Miley Justine Simmons. She is the niece of Danny Simmons and Russell Simmons, the co-founder of Def Jam Records.

== Career ==
Simmons found popularity between 2005 and 2009 with her family's MTV reality show Run's House. She and her sister, Angela Simmons, are designers for the shoe brand Pastry. Simmons appeared briefly on the soap opera television show Guiding Light and held a role in the film Speed Dating. In 2008 she secretly entered the Miss California USA pageant. She is in Boogie Town and the ensemble film Dysfunctional Friends. She also starred in the 2014 web series, Mixed. Simmons became the host and judge of Project Runway: Threads in 2014.

== Personal life ==
She attended St John's University.

Simmons and her boyfriend of several years, Michael Wayans have a daughter born in 2014.

== Filmography ==
=== Film ===
Year	Title	Role	Notes
2009	Boogie Town	Cicely	
2010	Speed-Dating	Elizabeth	
2011	Worst. Prom. Ever.	Hanna	TV movie
2011	Talking with the Taxman About Poetry	Tricia	
2012	Dysfunctional Friends	Hanna	
2012	From This Day Forward	Corinne	TV movie
2013	Hollywood Chaos	Alexis Burns	
2013	What Would You Do For Love	Piper	TV movie
2014	A Holiday Change	Doreen	
2016	Better Off Single	Bargoer	
2018	Juug Gone Wrong	Traci	
2019	Same Difference	Skye	
2019	South Central Love	Vanessa	
2019	A Holiday Change	Crystal Carter	
2020	Happiness	Queen	
2020	Still Here	TV Crew	
2020	Live	Ebony Little	Short
2021	Never and Again	Sonya	
2021	Hip Hop Family Christmas	Trish	TV movie
2022	Hip Hop Family Christmas Wedding	Trish	TV movie
2022	Christmas with My Ex	Shawna	
2023	Deadly Entanglement	Tammy	TV movie
2023	The Caregiver	Stephanie Douglas	

=== Television ===
Year	Title	Role	Notes
2005-09	Run's House	Herself	Main Cast
2007	Guiding Light	Lola	Regular Cast
2009	Daddy's Girls	Herself	Main Cast
2010	Running Russell Simmons	Herself	Episode: "You Only Live Once"
2011	Anderson Live	Herself	Episode: "Are Parents Playing Favorites?"
2011	GimmeMo'	Herself	Episode: "Self-Esteem"
2012	Cupcake Wars	Herself	Episode: "Cupcake Couture"
2013	Exhale	Herself	Episode: "Beauty & Style"
2014	David Tutera's CELEBrations	Herself	Episode: "Vanessa Simmons' 31st Birthday Blowout"
2014	Project Runway	Herself/Host	Episode: "Finale, Part 2"
2014	Project Runway: Threads	Herself/Host	Main Host
2017	Hip Hop Squares	Herself	Recurring Guest
2017-19	Growing Up Hip Hop	Herself	Main Cast: Season 3-5
2018-21	Monogamy	Caroline	Main Cast
2019	Love & Listings	Herself	Episode: "Cocktails are for Closers"
2019	Games People Play	Jackie Herman	Recurring Cast: Season 1
