= Daddy's Girls (2009 TV series) =

American reality television series

- Cast of Daddy's Girls Season 2 - (From left to right): Brian, Jessica, Lynn, Vanessa, and Angela.
- Genre: Reality
- Created by: Jason A. Carbone; Joseph Simmons
- Starring: Vanessa Simmons; Angela Simmons
- Country of origin: United States
- No. of seasons: 2
- No. of episodes: 16

Production
- Executive producers: Jacquelyn French; Jason A. Carbone; Joey Simmons; Liz Gateley; Nick Lee; Rob Cornick; Sean Combs
- Running time: 21 minutes
- Production companies: Bad Boy World Wide Entertainment Group; Good Clean Fun

Original release
- Network: MTV
- Release: January 5 – September 22, 2009

Related
- Run's House

Daddy's Girls is an American reality television series on MTV. The series debuted on January 5, 2009 with the second season premiering on August 11, 2009. The series follows Vanessa and Angela Simmons (oldest daughters of Joseph Simmons a.k.a. Rev Run), along with friends and family, as they start their new business and lives in Los Angeles.

The series is a spin-off of the series Run's House.

== Cast ==
- Angela Simmons
- Vanessa Simmons
- Rev Run
- Justine Simmons
- "JoJo" Simmons
- Diggy Simmons
- "Russy" Simmons
- Miley Simmons
- LynnQuinEtta James
- Mike Wayans (season 2)

== Episodes ==
=== Series overview ===
Season	Episodes	Originally released	
Season	Episodes	First released	Last released
1	7	January 5, 2009	February 16, 2009
2	8	August 11, 2009	September 22, 2009

=== Season 1 (2009) ===
No. overall	No. in season	Title	Original release date
-	-	"Launch Special"	December 28, 2008
1	1	"New Beginnings"	January 5, 2009
Angela is trying to get over her break up with Terry Kennedy.
2	2	"Sherlock Homey"	January 12, 2009
Angela and Vanessa try to catch Alycia in the act, but Jessica intervenes.
3	3	"Have Your Pastry And Eat It Too"	January 19, 2009
Vanessa and Angela get a job offer to host an LA party.
4	4	"Rev's Angels"	January 26, 2009
Angela wants a motorcycle; Vanessa goes speed dating to rehearse for a film.
5	5	"Birthday Presence"	February 2, 2009
Angela and Vanessa have trouble balancing work and family; Jessica and Alycia consider interviewing for an assistant.
6	6	"Keepin' It Real Estate"	February 9, 2009
The girls look for a house, and Jessica deals with her "self issues."
7	7	"Pastry Party: The Best Of Daddy's Girls"	February 16, 2009

=== Season 2 (2009) ===
No. overall	No. in season	Title	Original release date
8	1	"Movin' On Up"	August 11, 2009
Vanessa and Angela move into their new house in Beverly Hills. The good times hit a few snags when Angela deceives Vanessa into letting her friend Danielle move in.
9	2	"In The Dawg House"	August 11, 2009
Danielle wants to bring a dog into the house so Angela brings her to an animal shelter. Once she is there she adopts a cat. Vanessa becomes extremely angry because her boyfriend is allergic to cats. Meanwhile, Jessica helps Brian win money in a basketball game.
10	3	"Bummer Camp"	August 18, 2009
Vanessa, Angela, Lynn and Shawna decide to go camping for the weekend. While they're away, Jess and Danielle get into an argument that prompts Danielle to head back to New York.
11	4	"Mousewarming Party"	August 25, 2009
Angela, Vanessa and Jessica throw a housewarming party, and everything's great until they discover the house is infested with mice! Angela freaks out and threatens to leave the house forever, so Vanessa and Jessica quickly track down an exterminator.
12	5	"Model Behavior"	September 1, 2009
Vanessa and Angela cast models for their fashion show. Lynn wants to be involved, but she's been unreliable in the past, and Vanessa doesn't want to make the same mistake twice.
13	6	"Turning The Tables"	September 8, 2009
Angela wants to be a DJ, but ends up biting off more than she can chew. So the others decide to teach her a lesson.
14	7	"Hoop-LA"	September 15, 2009
A promotional interview is canceled on Angela and Vanessa. Later, Jessica has a crush on one of the guys at her weekly pickup game.
15	8	"What's In Store"	September 22, 2009
Exciting life opportunities may split up the ladies and put their retail store in jeopardy. Meanwhile, Rev bonds with Vanessa's boyfriend.
