= Project Runway: Threads =

- Genre: Reality television
- Presented by: Vanessa Simmons
- Judges: Christian Siriano; Vanessa Simmons; Ingrid Nilsen
- Country of origin: United States
- Original language: English
- No. of seasons: 1
- No. of episodes: 8

Production
- Executive producers: Barbara Schneeweiss; Bob Weinstein; David Hillman; Desiree Gruber; Eli Lehrer; Harvey Weinstein; Jane Cha; Mary Donahue; Meryl Poster; Patrick Reardon; Sara Rea
- Production location: Los Angeles FIDM
- Production companies: Full Picture Entertainment; Sara Rea Productions; The Weinstein Company Television

Original release
- Network: Lifetime
- Release: October 23 – December 18, 2014

Project Runway: Threads is a spin-off reality competition based on Project Runway. It premiered October 23, 2014 on Lifetime. The series features skilled teen and tween fashion designers.

Each week, three new young designers compete for a prize package worth over $25,000. The prizes will include $10,000 to be used at any Jo-Ann Fabrics and Crafts Store or joann.com; a scholarship to the summer program at Fashion Institute of Design & Merchandising in Los Angeles, including travel expenses; a top-of-the-line sewing and embroidery studio courtesy of Brother International Corporation and the winning designer's look will appear in Seventeen.

== Host and Judges ==
The host is Vanessa Simmons, who also serves as a judge. She is joined by regular judges Christian Siriano (Project Runway Season 4 winner) and Ingrid Nilsen, a YouTube vlogger known as "Missglamorazzi." In addition, there are one or two guest judges each episode.

== Format ==
Each episode begins with a “Show Us Your Style Challenge,” where the three competitors reveal a look, designed and sewn in advance, which showcases their personal aesthetic. The winner of this initial challenge earns an advantage over their adversaries. The designers bring an adult assistant to help them complete their challenges—the primary one and another called the "Surprise Door Twist." The Surprise Door Twist is to reimagine a white dress. The designers have unlimited access to the Jo-Ann Fabric Room and the Brother Sewing and Embroidery Studio.

== Season 1 (2014) ==
=== Episode 1: Red Carpet ===
Original airdate: October 23, 2014

- Challenge: Create a red carpet look that shows off each designer's individual style.
- Surprise Door Twist: Design a “Street Style” dress.
- Contestants: (Name - Age - Hometown - Adult Design Assistant)
  - Bradford - 13 - Birmingham, AL - mother Dana
  - Cambria - 13 - West Hills, CA - father David
  - Kenzie - 12 - Portland, OR - mother Molly
- Guest Judges: Kelly Osbourne, Jaime King
- WINNER: Bradford

=== Episode 2: Fashion Capitals ===
Original airdate: October 30, 2014

- Challenge: Create a look which could be worn on the runway in one of three capitals of fashion—Paris, Tokyo, and New York City.
- Surprise Door Twist: Design a dress inspired by contestants' hometowns.
- Contestants: (Name - Age - Hometown - Adult Design Assistant - Fashion Capital)
  - Aliyah Royale - 14 - Valley Glen, CA - mother Tanya - Paris
  - Grace - 15 - La Cañada, CA - mother Peggy - New York City
  - Grayson - 14 - New Orleans, LA - grandmother Sirje - Tokyo
- Guest Judge: Jasmine Snow (Senior Fashion Editor, Seventeen Magazine)
- WINNER: Grace

=== Episode 3: The Ultimate Accessory ===
Original airdate: November 6, 2014

- Challenge: Create a look inspired by designer statement pieces—a jeweled headpiece by Rodrigo Otazu, a clutch by Vivienne Westwood, shoes by Alexander McQueen or a vintage Chanel handbag.
- Surprise Door Twist: Design a dress using only fabric paint to showcase themselves as designers.
- Contestants: (Name - Age - Hometown - Adult Design Assistant - Designer Statement Piece)
  - Colette - 15 - Chicago, IL - mother Jill - handbag
  - Emily- 15 - Quincy, MA - father David - clutch
  - Zachary - 15 - Berkeley, CA - mother Camille - jeweled headpiece (Zachary, in 2015 was a contestant on Project Runway: Junior)
- Guest Judge: Gina Kelly (Fashion Director, Seventeen Magazine)
- WINNER: Zachary

=== Episode 4: Pop Star ===
Original airdate: November 13, 2014

- Challenge: Create look suitable for their favorite pop star: Katy Perry, Lady Gaga and Florence Welch.
- Surprise Door Twist: Design a dress for their favorite pop star using only unconventional materials from the craft section of a Jo-Ann Fabrics and Crafts Store.
- Contestants: (Name - Age - Hometown - Adult Design Assistant - Favorite Pop Star)
  - Brianna - 13 - Ventura, CA - mother Lori - Florence Welch
  - Claire - 13 - Braintree, MA - mother Kristen - Katy Perry
  - Matt - 16 - Manhattan Beach, CA - grandmother Dorothy - Lady Gaga (Matt, in 2016 was a contestant on Project Runway: Junior)
- Guest Judge: Zendaya
- WINNER: Brianna

=== Episode 5: Prom ===
Original airdate: November 20, 2014

- Challenge: Create a prom look that shows off each designer's individual style.
- Surprise Door Twist: Design a dress using only unconventional materials - flowers.
- Contestants: (Name - Age - Hometown - Adult Design Assistant)
  - Bella - 12 - Manhattan Beach, CA - grandmother Nancy
  - Kimanni - 13 - Atlanta, GA - mother Rochelle
  - Tieler - 14 - New Orleans, LA - mother Tahmi (Tieler, in 2016 was a contestant on Project Runway: Junior)
- Guest Judge: Gina Kelly (Fashion Director, Seventeen Magazine)
- WINNER: Tieler

=== Episode 6: Monster Mash Up ===
Original airdate: December 4, 2014

- Challenge: Create a look of two monsters mashed together for inspiration.
- Surprise Door Twist: Design a dress using only unconventional materials- candy
- Contestants: (Name - Age - Hometown - Adult Design Assistant)
  - Ciara - 10 - LA, California - mother Tammy
  - Katie - 11 - Huntington Beach, CA - mother Rosette
  - Lucas - 12 - Orlando, FL - father Nick
- Guest Judge: Jasmine Snow (senior fashion editor for Seventeen magazine)
- WINNER: Katie

=== Episode 7: Cover Look ===
Original airdate: December 11, 2014

- Challenge: Create a Seventeen Magazine cover look.
- Surprise Door Twist: Utilize a white dress, drawstring, sequin trim, purple dye, blue fabric, and fringe.
- Contestants: (Name - Age - Hometown - Adult Design Assistant)
  - Alex - 16 - West Covina, CA - father Voislav
  - Julia - 15 - Lafayette, CA - mother Karin
  - Molly - 16 - Washington, CT - mother Patricia
- Guest Judge: Gina Kelly (Fashion Director, Seventeen Magazine)
- WINNER: Julia

=== Episode 8: Showstopper ===
Original airdate: December 18, 2014

- Challenge: Create a showstopping finale runway look.
- Surprise Door Twist: Design an opening look to go with the finale look.
- Contestants: (Name - Age - Hometown - Adult Design Assistant)
  - Mady - 14 - Stover, MO - mother Tracey
  - Christopher - 14 - Tuzcon, AZ - grandmother Zinda
  - Zoe - 15 - Colchester, CT - father Louie
- Guest Judge: Jaime King
- WINNER: Zoe

== International broadcast ==
The series premiered in Australia on June 7, 2015 on Arena.
