= Barely Famous =

- Genre: Comedy; Satire
- Created by: Erin Foster; Sara Foster
- Starring: Erin Foster; Sara Foster; Abbey DiGregorio; Jensen Karp
- Country of origin: United States
- Original language: English
- No. of seasons: 2
- No. of episodes: 12

Production
- Executive producers: Erin Foster; Sara Foster; Jason Carbone; Nick Lee; Oly Obst; Josh Lieberman; Kimberly Carver; Jill Holmes; Kristen Kelly; Fernando Mills; Tricia Biggio; Susan Levison
- Camera setup: Single-camera
- Running time: 30 minutes
- Production companies: Good Clean Fun Productions; 3 Arts Entertainment

Original release
- Network: VH1
- Release: March 18, 2015 – July 27, 2016

Barely Famous is an American reality television parody on VH1. The first season was 6 episodes broadcast on Wednesday nights at 9:30, starting March 18, 2015. On April 28, 2015, VH1 announced that the show had been renewed for a second six-episode season which premiered on June 29, 2016.

== Background ==
The show was created by sisters Sara and Erin Foster who stated via a press release that they were influenced by The Larry Sanders Show, Extras and The Comeback and that "By design, the show pokes fun at the reality show genre as we play these stereotypical, delusional sisters who find themselves shooting a reality show". Erin said, "I wanted to sell a show about fame and celebrities and wealth and vanity and Hollywood". According to Susan Levison, VH1's Executive Vice President of original programming, the goal of the show was "to present a humorous take on reality TV and the rarified world of Hollywood".

== Premise ==
The show follows quasi-famous sisters Sara and Erin Foster around in a reality show format, but it is scripted and they play exaggerated satirical versions of themselves, and get into various predicaments.

== Celebrity appearances ==
=== Cameos ===
The show has had brief appearances by Amanda de Cadenet, Ashley Benson, Milla Jovovich, Kate Hudson, Jessica Alba, Rachel Zoe, Courteney Cox, Nicole Richie, Kevin Connolly and Molly Sims as themselves. In addition to return appearances by Jessica Alba and Kate Hudson, in the second season Chris Martin, Chelsea Handler, Zach Braff, Kate Upton, Cindy Crawford, Brooke Burke, Dr. Phil, Ali Larter, Lauren London and Joey Fatone have appearances as themselves. In an interview, Sara Foster said that they'd originally wanted Mindy Kaling to play the part of a TV doctor but after Kaling was not available for filming, they offered Upton the part and it was accepted.

=== Guest roles ===
Comedian Esther Povitsky played a receptionist at an exclusive private school in the 3rd episode titled "Favorite Socks". In the 6th episode titled "Bananas Foster", Kay Cannon appeared as a lesbian director version of herself who was considering casting Sara for a part, and Sara falsely says her sister is both single and still a lesbian in order to get Cannon to attend her house party.

In the 4th show of the second season "Death of a Relationship", Jonathan Goldsmith plays a much older love interest of Erin who dies from a heart attack after taking up power lifting.

== Episodes ==
=== Season 1 (2015) ===
No. overall	No. in season	Title	Directed by	Written by	Original release date	U.S. viewers (millions)
1	1	"Barely Famous"	Jason A. Carbone	Unknown	March 18, 2015	0.122
2	2	"Not a Booty Call"	Jason A. Carbone	Unknown	March 25, 2015	0.065
3	3	"Favourite Socks"	Jason A. Carbone	Unknown	April 1, 2015	0.081
4	4	"Be More Likeable"	Jason A. Carbone	Unknown	April 8, 2015	0.127
5	5	"The Foster Sisters' Sisters"	Jason A. Carbone	Unknown	April 15, 2015	0.146
6	6	"Bananas Foster"	Jason A. Carbone	Unknown	April 22, 2015	N/A

=== Season 2 (2016) ===
No. overall	No. in season	Title	Directed by	Written by	Original release date	U.S. viewers (millions)
7	1	"Career Goals"	Unknown	Unknown	June 29, 2016	0.217
8	2	"No Scrubs"	Unknown	Unknown	June 29, 2016	0.130
9	3	"The Vacation Episode"	Unknown	Unknown	July 6, 2016	0.244
10	4	"Death of a Relationship"	Unknown	Unknown	July 13, 2016	0.168
11	5	"Love & Upton"	Unknown	Unknown	July 20, 2016	0.188
12	6	"Breaking Blonde"	Unknown	Unknown	July 27, 2016	0.220

== Reception ==
Amy Amatangelo, writing for The Hollywood Reporter, called the show "Part mockumentary, part reality show, part sitcom and entirely hilarious" and said the show works because "the innately likable siblings are willing to be the brunt of the joke".

Ellie Shechet, in a review for The Muse – Jezebel, said that the show was surprisingly great. While characterizing the show as one that makes you giggle (not laugh) and as relatively funny, she said that she couldn't wait for season 2.

David Hinkley, in a review for the New York Daily News, felt that the show was taking on an impossible task – trying to create situations that are sillier or more outlandish than what is already on reality shows. And he felt it was "not at all hilarious" and in the end more likely to make us "nod off".

Allison Keene, in a review for Collider gave the Pilot a "3-star Good" rating (Proceed with cautious optimism). She said the show was "fun, and while it has a clear sense of the scene it's deconstructing with perceptive humor, it's never mean".
