= Sara Foster =

American actress (born 1981)

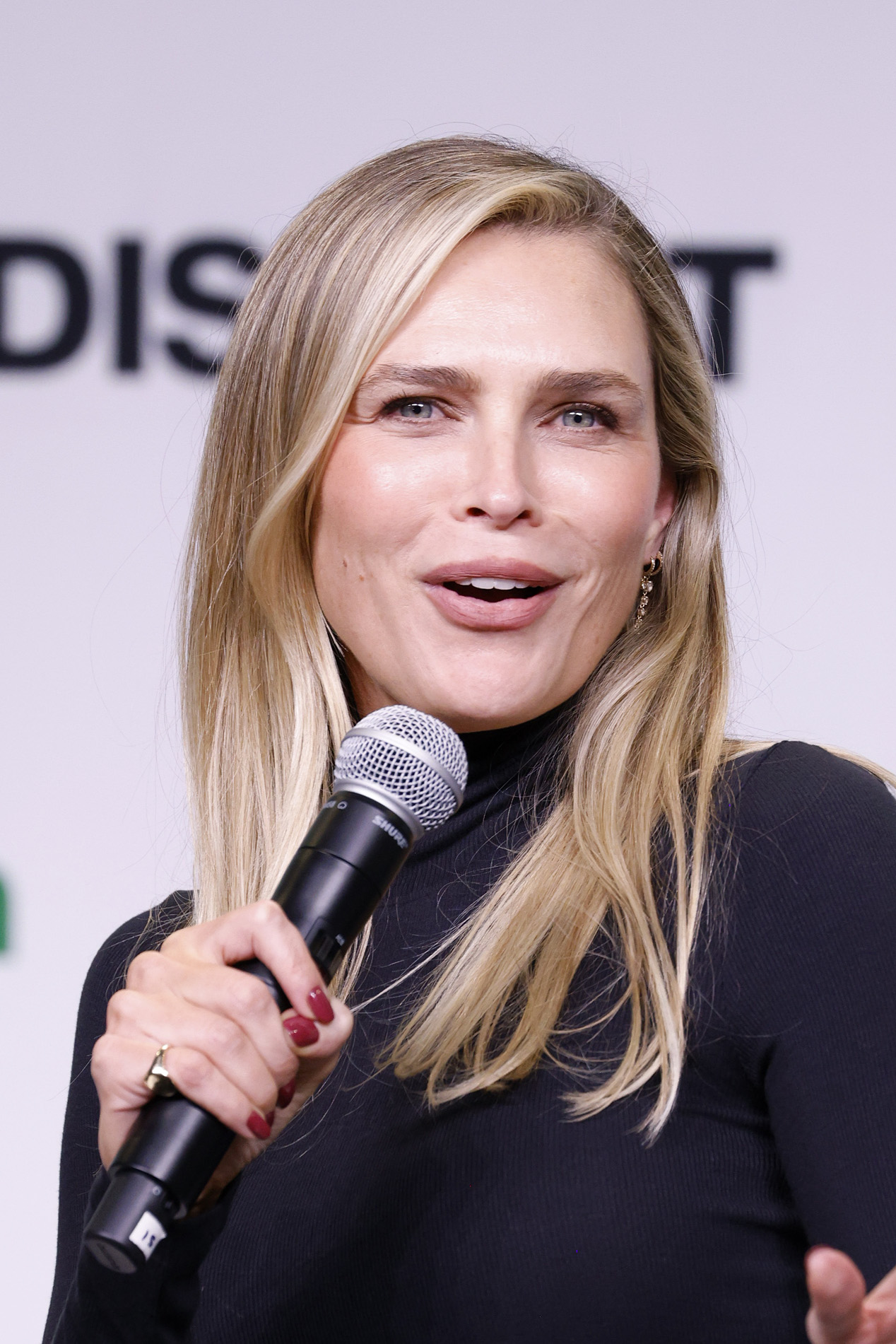
- Foster in 2024
- Born: February 5, 1981 (age 45); Los Angeles, California, U.S.
- Occupation: Actress
- Years active: 1999–present
- Partner: Tommy Haas (2006–2024)
- Children: 2
- Father: David Foster
- Relatives: Erin Foster (sister); Amy S. Foster (half-sister)

Sara Foster (born February 5, 1981) is an American actress, producer and socialite.

== Early life ==
Sara Michael Foster was born on February 5, 1981, in Los Angeles, California to record producer David Foster and former model Rebecca Dyer. She is the older sister of producer Erin Foster and fashion stylist Jordan Foster. After Foster's parents divorced in 1986 when she was five years old, she and her sisters were raised by her mother.

Foster and her sister have revealed to have felt resentment to her father's distance growing up, sharing on their podcast "I was dealing with my whole own emotional turmoil, which was watching my father raise other children. They had a very different life." Foster and her sisters struggled with being perceived as spoiled rich kids while living a different reality, "We did not have a trust fund; we had to have a job."

== Career ==
Foster began acting with her debut role in the 2004 film D.E.B.S. She starred in roles in The Big Bounce, Entourage, Crossing Jordan, CSI: Crime Scene Investigation, and Psych 9.

In 2009, Foster started in the recurring role of Jen Clark on The CW drama series 90210.

She briefly hosted Entertainment Tonight spin-off ET on MTV in 2002. She has also appeared in the Backstreet Boys music video "Shape of My Heart", as well as music video for "Drop That Baby" by The Wondergirls.

In 2015, she and her sister Erin Foster created the TV series Barely Famous on VH1. The show was a mockumentary satire of reality TV and ran for two seasons.

From 2017 to 2020, Foster and her sister Erin were co-creative heads for Bumble. Since 2021, Foster and Erin host a podcast, The World's First Podcast with Erin & Sara Foster.

Foster and Erin co-produced the 2024 Netflix series Nobody Wants This, inspired by Erin's real-life love story. Foster described herself as "an ally" for the Jewish people, citing the way Judaism "has brought our family together". Following the success, she had signed an overall deal with 20th Television.

== Personal life ==
In 2006, Foster began dating German professional tennis player Tommy Haas. They have two daughters, Valentina Evelyn (b. 2010) and Josephine Lena (b. 2015). In August 2024, they announced their separation after 18 years together.

== Filmography ==
Film and television roles
Year	Title	Role	Notes
1999	D.R.E.A.M. Team	Model	Television film; uncredited
2004	D.E.B.S.	Amy Bradshaw	Film
2004	The Big Bounce	Nancy Hayes	Film
2004	Entourage	Herself	Episode: "Talk Show"
2005	Crossing Jordan	Tammi Eldridge	Episode: "Family Affair"
2005	CSI: Crime Scene Investigation	Amy Maynard	Episode: "Unbearable"
2006	South Beach	Arielle	Episode: unaired pilot
2008	Bachelor Party 2: The Last Temptation	Melinda	Direct-to-video film
2008	The Other End of the Line	Emory Banks	Film
2009–2012	90210	Jennifer "Jen" Clark	Recurring role, 23 episodes
2010	Psych 9	Roslyn Hanniger	Film
2011	Demoted	Jennifer	Film
2015–2016	Barely Famous	Herself	Main role; also executive producer
2016	Celebrity Name Game	Herself	Celebrity player; 3 episodes
2018	The $100,000 Pyramid	Herself	Celebrity player; episode: "Leslie Jones vs. Taye Diggs and Sara Foster vs. Erin Foster"
