= Life of Ryan =

- Genre: Reality
- Starring: Ryan Sheckler
- Opening theme: "Oh! Gravity." by Switchfoot
- Country of origin: United States
- Original language: English
- No. of seasons: 3
- No. of episodes: 30

Production
- Executive producers: Jason Carbone; Sarah Kane
- Producer: Ryan Sheckler
- Production location: San Clemente, California
- Running time: 23 minutes approx.
- Production company: Good Clean Fun

Original release
- Network: MTV
- Release: August 27, 2007 – April 17, 2009

Life of Ryan is an American reality television series on MTV. The series debuted on August 27, 2007 with the second season premiering on January 8, 2008 and the 3rd and final season airing on April 17, 2009 The series follows the day-to-day life of professional skateboarder Ryan Sheckler as he manages his personal life and his career. Most episodes take place at Sheckler's home in San Clemente, California. The show aired for three seasons total.

== Cast ==
=== Main cast ===
- Ryan Sheckler, professional skateboarder
- Shane Sheckler, Ryan's 14-year-old brother
- Kane Sheckler, Ryan's 7-year-old brother
- Gretchen Sheckler, Ryan's mother/manager
- Randall 'Randy' Sheckler, Ryan's father

=== Supporting cast ===
- Steve Astephen, Ryan's agent
- Casey Feitler, Ryan's friend
- Tony Panici, Ryan's friend
- Taylor Bogart, Ryan's friend
- Mitch Bohi, Ryan's friend
- Whitney Borchard, Ryan's friend
- Christi, Randy Sheckler's girlfriend
- Bruce, Gretchen Sheckler's boyfriend
- Kayla Kudla, Ryan's girlfriend

=== Guest appearances ===
- Jereme Rogers
- Paul Rodriguez
- Greg Lutzka
- Bob Burnquist
- Tony Hawk
- Carey Hart
- Steve Nash
- Ryan Seacrest
- Lil Jon
- Verne Troyer
- Paula Abdul
- Randy Jackson
- Colin McKay
- Jay Leno

== Episodes ==
=== Series overview ===
Season	Episodes	Originally released	
Season	Episodes	First released	Last released
1	8	August 27, 2007	October 15, 2007
2	16	January 8, 2008	May 19, 2008
3	6	April 17, 2009	

=== Season 1 (2007) ===
No. overall	No. in season	Title	Original release date
1	1	"Chasing Cambria"	August 27, 2007
2	2	"5th Wheel"	September 3, 2007
3	3	"Careless Whispers"	September 10, 2007
4	4	"Raising Kane"	September 17, 2007
5	5	"X-treme Distractions"	September 24, 2007
6	6	"He Said, She Said"	October 1, 2007
7	7	"Down Goes Ryan"	October 8, 2007
8	8	"Home and Away"	October 15, 2007

=== Season 2 (2008) ===
No. overall	No. in season	Title	Original release date
9	1	"Don't Go"	January 8, 2008
10	2	"My Brother's Keeper"	January 15, 2008
11	3	"Houston, We Have A Problem"	January 22, 2008
12	4	"Sheckler, Inc."	January 29, 2008
13	5	"And You Just Might Be The One"	February 5, 2008
14	6	"Odd Man Out"	February 12, 2008
15	7	"Man's Best Friend"	February 19, 2008
16	8	"Skate In Heavenly Peace"	February 26, 2008
17	9	"Partying Ways"	March 4, 2008
18	10	"Single Life"	March 11, 2008
19	11	"Flashback"	March 18, 2008
20	12	"New Beginnings"	March 25, 2008
21	13	"Past, Present and Future"	April 1, 2008
22	14	"Cracks In The Crew"	April 8, 2008
23	15	"Tony's Test"	May 19, 2008
24	16	"Finally On My Own"	May 19, 2008

=== Season 3 (2009) ===
No. overall	No. in season	Title	Original release date
25	1	"My House, My Rules"	April 17, 2009
26	2	"Adding Insult to Injury"	April 17, 2009
27	3	"Business Before Pleasure"	April 17, 2009
28	4	"Right Here, Right Now"	April 17, 2009
29	5	"Model Behavior"	April 17, 2009
30	6	"What's Next?"	April 17, 2009

== Production and broadcast ==
The show was produced by Carbone Entertainment and Good Clean Fun for MTV and can be seen on MTV Arabia, MTV, MTV2, MTV Australia, MTV Europe. MTV Poland, MTV Adria, MTV Hungary, MTV Romania, MTV Portugal, MTV Central, MTV Canada, MTV Italia, MTV New Zealand, MTV UK, MTV Turkey and MTV Latin America. Life of Ryan debuted on Monday, August 27, 2007, at 10:30pm following The Hills.

== Home media ==
Life of Ryan: The Complete Series was released on DVD on April 21, 2009. Special features include 3 skate featurettes.
