= Erin Foster =

American writer and performer (born 1982)

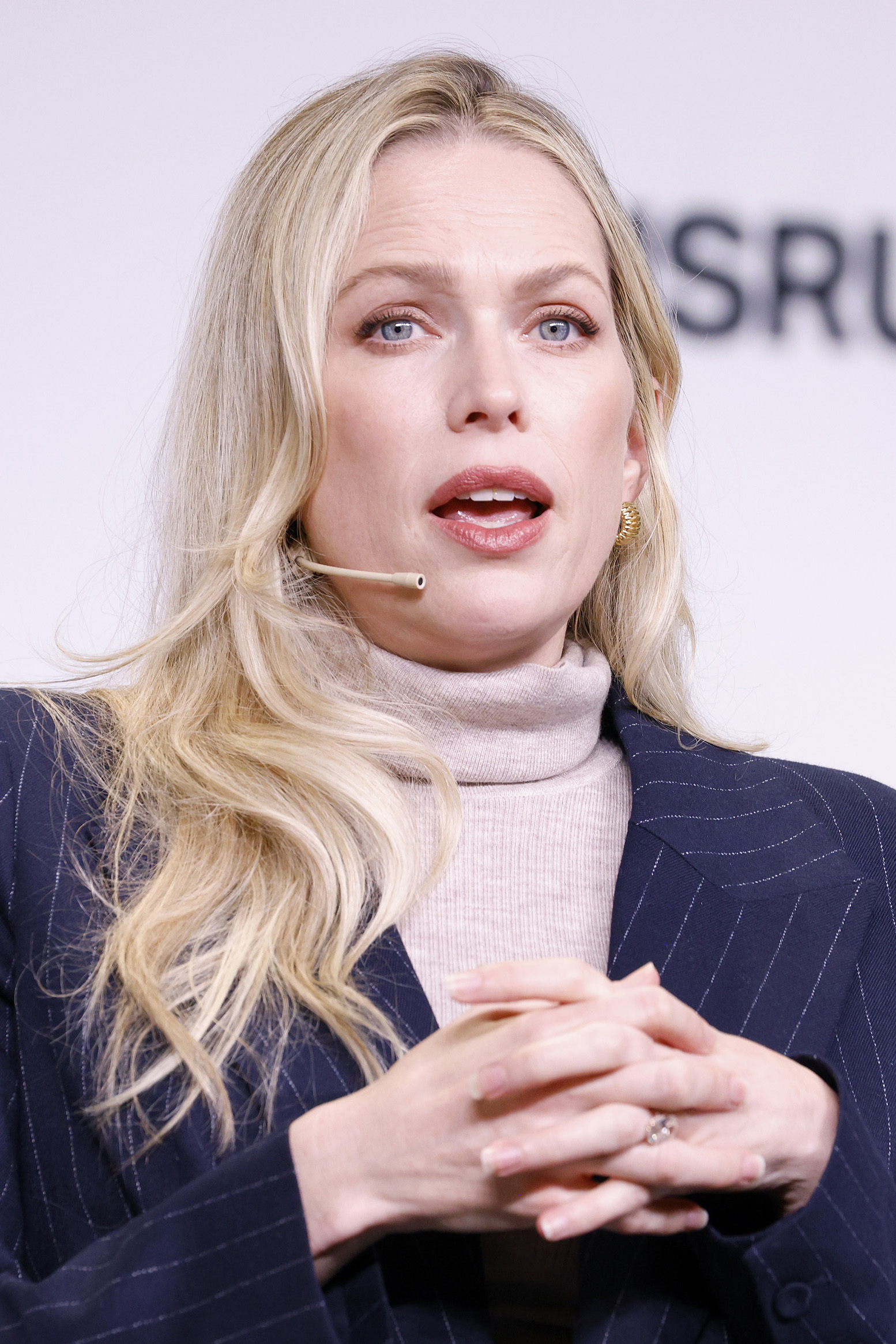
- Foster in 2024
- Born: August 23, 1982 (age 44)
- Occupations: Writer; producer; actress; podcaster; entrepreneur
- Years active: 1998-present
- Spouse: Simon Tikhman (m. 2019)
- Children: 1
- Parent: David Foster (father)
- Relatives: Sara Foster (sister); Amy S. Foster (half-sister)

Erin Foster Tikhman (born August 23, 1982) is an American writer, actress, and producer.

== Early life ==
Erin Foster was born on August 23, 1982, in Los Angeles, California, to record producer David Foster and former model Rebecca Dyer. She is the middle sister of actress Sara Foster and fashion stylist Jordan Foster. After her parents divorced in 1986 when she was four years old, she and her sisters were raised by her mother. Foster later attended boarding school in Switzerland.

Through her father's previous marriage to B.J. Cook, Foster is half-sister of songwriter Amy S. Foster. Through her father's later marriages to Linda Thompson in 1999 and Yolanda Hadid in 2011, she was stepsister to television personalities Brody and Brandon Jenner and models Gigi and Bella Hadid.

Foster has said she resented her father's distance growing up, saying on her podcast, "I was dealing with my whole own emotional turmoil, which was watching my father raise other children. They had a very different life." She and her sisters struggled with being perceived as spoiled rich kids: "We did not have a trust fund; we had to have a job."

== Career ==
In the 2000s, Foster began her acting career, appearing in Castle, The O.C., House, American Dreams, Gilmore Girls, Reno 911!, CSI: Crime Scene Investigation, Judging Amy, and Roswell.

Foster later transitioned to writing and producing. In 2012, she was a staff writer on the NBC sitcom The New Normal. In 2015, she and her sister Sara Foster created the TV series Barely Famous on VH1. The show was a mockumentary satire of reality TV and ran for two seasons.

From 2017 to 2020, Foster and her sister Sara were co-creative heads of Bumble. Since 2021, they have hosted the podcast The World's First Podcast with Erin & Sara Foster.

In 2024, Foster created, wrote and co-produced the Netflix show Nobody Wants This, a romantic comedy series loosely based on her and her husband Simon Tikhman's love story as an inter-faith couple. The show stars Adam Brody and Kristen Bell, who also served as co-producer. It became an international hit, reaching the number one English series on Netflix spot in its second week with 15.9 million views. It was also a critical success, with review aggregator website Rotten Tomatoes reporting a 95% approval rating, with praise for its cast and writing. In October 2024, the show was renewed for a second season.

== Personal life ==
Foster was previously in a relationship with Samantha Ronson.

In 2018, Foster began dating investor and music executive Simon Tikhman after meeting at the gym. Tikhman co-founded The Core Entertainment, artist management company in partnership with Live Nation, and launched The Core Records music label in partnership with Universal Music Group in 2023.

On December 31, 2019, Foster wed Tikhman in Nashville, Tennessee. Foster converted to Reform Judaism ahead of her marriage to Tikhman, who is Jewish; she was previously agnostic.

On May 17, 2024, Foster and Tikhman welcomed a daughter, Noa Mimi. They reside in Beverly Hills, California.

== Filmography ==
- Roswell (TV, 2002) – Susie
- Judging Amy (TV, 2002) – Gerry
- CSI: Crime Scene Investigation (TV, 2004) – Crackhead Girl
- Reno 911! (TV, 2004) – Garcia's Hooker
- Gilmore Girls (TV, 2004) – Cheryl
- Cellular (2004) – Surf Girl
- American Dreams (TV, 2005) – Sky
- House (TV, 2005) – Dr. Petra Gilmar/Second Applicant
- The O.C. (TV, 2005–2006) – Heather
- The Darkroom (2006) – Kimberly
- He's Such a Girl (2007) – Tara Peters
- Castle (2009) – Skye Blue
- Still Waiting... (2009) – Kristy
- Candidly Nicole (2014) – Herself/Nicole's friend
- Barely Famous (2015) – Herself
- The $100,000 Pyramid (2018) – Herself
- Nobody Wants This (2024-) – Creator, Writer, Executive Producer
