= Run's House =

Television series

- From left to right: JoJo, Rev Run, Russy, Justine, Vanessa, Angela and Diggy (at the bottom) with Miley.
- Genre: Reality
- Created by: Russell Simmons; Sean "Diddy" Combs; John Davies; Stan Lathan; Will Griffin
- Starring: Joseph Simmons; Justine Simmons; Vanessa Simmons; Angela Simmons; Joseph Simmons, Jr.; Diggy Simmons; Russell Simmons II; Miley Justine Simmons
- Theme music composer: Joseph Simmons; Darryl McDaniels; David Reeves
- Opening theme: "Run's House"
- Country of origin: United States
- Original language: English
- No. of seasons: 6
- No. of episodes: 59

Production
- Executive producers: Jacqueline French; Jason Carbone; John Davies; Liz Gateley; Mike Powers; Nick Lee; Russell Simmons; Sean "Diddy" Combs; Stan Lathan; Will Griffin
- Producer: James DuBose
- Camera setup: Multiple
- Running time: 20 to 23 minutes
- Production companies: Good Clean Fun; Carbone Entertainment; Blacjac Entertainment Group; Simmons-Lathan Media Group; Bad Boy Worldwide Entertainment

Original release
- Network: MTV
- Release: October 13, 2005 – July 13, 2009

Related
- Daddy's Girls

Run's House is an American reality television series that debuted on October 13, 2005. The series chronicles the family life of former Run-DMC rapper and hip-hop music pioneer Joseph Simmons, also known as Rev. Run.

== Background ==
The series is about the family life of former Run-DMC rapper and hip-hop music pioneer Joseph Simmons, also known as Rev. Run.

Its theme song and show name are from the Run-DMC album Tougher Than Leather. It was filmed in the Simmons family home in Saddle River, New Jersey; the Simmons offices in Manhattan; and the apartment shared by Joseph's daughters, Vanessa and Angela, in Los Angeles.

== Cast ==
- Joseph Simmons – Simmons, best known as DJ Run, was a founding member of hip-hop group Run–DMC. He later became a reverend at Zoe Ministries, a controversial church that solicits monetary pledges for spiritual enlightenment, and changed his name to Rev Run.He met his second wife Justine when they were teenagers.
- Justine Simmons – Justine is married to Joseph Simmons and mother of their four children, as well as stepmother to Simmons's three children from previous marriage to Vaughn. She sells a jewelry line called "Brown Sugar" and appeared in the show All About the Washingtons.
- Vanessa Simmons – Vanessa is an aspiring actress. She and her sister Angela design for the shoe brand Pastry. In 2008, she secretly entered the Miss California USA pageant.
- Angela Simmons – Angela is the editor for Angela's Rundown, a monthly mini magazine for teens distributed within Word Up! (magazine). In October 2006 Angela is featured in Rapper Bow Wow music video for his single, Shortie Like Mine. In 2007 she and Vanessa launch Pastry Footwear under their family's line of footwear, Run Athletics. In 2026 she signed a recording contract with Ruff Ryders Entertainment and released her debut single.
- JoJo Simmons – JoJo is the third oldest of the six children.
- Diggy Simmons – Diggy is an aspiring rapper and is working on a fashion line with his mentor, Pharrell Williams. Diggy released his first, mixtape The First Flight at midnight on December 2, 2009.
- "Russy" Simmons – Russell Simmons II is the youngest son. Russy stars with his parents and younger sister, Miley on the shows Rev Runs Around the World, which airs on the Travel Channel, and Rev Run's Sunday Suppers on the Cooking Channel.
- Victoria Anne Simmons – Victoria died the day she was born, on September 26, 2006, reportedly due to omphalocele, a birth defect that caused her organs to grow outside her body. The Simmons family decided to allow camera crews to be in the hospital room as they broke the news to their children. They wanted to show viewers how, as a family, they dealt with the tragedy.
- Miley Justine Simmons – Shortly after the death of Victoria Anne Simmons, the family started adoption proceedings which were completed in September 2007. A month later, they were introduced to Miley.

== Syndication ==
Run's House aired on the Nick Jr. Channel's NickMom block from October 2014 to September 27, 2015, and aired on MTV Classic from August 1 to December 30, 2016, And aired on BET Her (Formerly Centric) for a time.
