= Tia & Tamera =

- Genre: Reality
- Starring: Tia Mowry; Tamera Mowry
- Country of origin: United States
- Original language: English
- No. of seasons: 3
- No. of episodes: 40

Production
- Executive producers: Jason Carbone; Sarah Kane; Tia Mowry-Hardrict; Tamera Mowry-Housley; Sarah Weidman; Sitarah Pendelton
- Running time: 45 minutes
- Production company: Good Clean Fun

Original release
- Network: Style Network
- Release: August 8, 2011 – September 22, 2013

Tia & Tamera is an American reality television series that aired on the Style Network from August 8, 2011, until September 22, 2013. Originally titled Tia & Tamera Take 2, the series started off as a television special that aired on July 17, 2010. It was announced in February 2011 that the special was picked to series. Later, the series was changed to its current title and debuted on August 8, 2011, on the now defunct Style Network. In September 2011, Style Network renewed the show for a second season, which later premiered on June 11, 2012. Season 3 was announced on February 12, 2013, with it premiering on July 14, 2013. The third season concluded September 22, 2013, and was the last program to air on Style, which re-branded as Esquire Network the next day. Tia & Tamera began airing on E! starting October 15, 2013, along with former Style Network series Giuliana and Bill.

Tia and Tamera Mowry announced on December 30, 2013, that the series would not return for a fourth season.

== Premise ==
The series goes inside the lives of celebrity identical twins Tia and Tamera Mowry as they balance their acting careers with major life transformations of marriage and motherhood.

== Cast ==
=== Main ===
==== Tia Dashon Mowry ====
The twin sisters became teen TV stars as the main characters on the popular comedy series Sister, Sister. Tia continued to act and produce while pursuing a psychology degree at Pepperdine University and starred in the hit series The Game. Other credits include Girlfriends and Double Wedding, which reunited her onscreen with Tamera. Tia married actor Cory Hardrict in April 2008; their first child, a son named Cree Taylor Hardrict, was born on June 28, 2011; a daughter, Cairo Tiahna Hardrict, was born on May 5, 2018.

==== Tamera Mowry-Housley ====
With her twin sister, Tia, by her side, Tamera became a teen TV star thanks to her work on the wildly popular comedy series Sister, Sister. She continued to act and produce while pursuing a psychology degree at Pepperdine University. Other credits include Double Wedding (an onscreen reunion with Tia), Roommates, and Strong Medicine. Tamera married Fox News correspondent Adam Housley in May 2011. The couple confirmed that they were expecting their first child in April 2012. Tamera gave birth to a son named Aden John Tanner Housley on November 12, 2012. Tamera and Adam Housley welcomed their newest bundle of joy Ariah to the world on July 1, 2015.

=== Supporting ===
- Cory Hardrict, Tia's husband
- Cree Hardrict, Tia and Cory's son
- Adam Housley, Tamera's husband
- Aden Housley, Tamera and Adam's son
- Jackée Harry, Tia and Tamera's former co-star on Sister, Sister
- Wendy Raquel Robinson, Tia's co-star on The Game
- Andrea, Tamera's best friend
- Jerome, Tia and Tamera's cousin
- Carlos, Tia and Tamera's cousin
- Kam Horne, Tia's friend
- Amy Davidson, Tamera's friend
- Hosea Chanchez, Tia's co-star on The Game (season 1)
- Keisha, Tia and Tamera's cousin (season 2)

== Episodes ==
=== Series overview ===
Season	Episodes	Originally released	
Season	Episodes	First released	Last released
1	8	August 8, 2011	October 3, 2011
2	22	June 11, 2012	January 15, 2013
3	10	July 14, 2013	September 22, 2013

=== Season 1 (2011) ===
No. overall	No. in season	Title	Original release date
1	1	"Sisters & Babies & Weddings — Oh My!"	August 8, 2011
Tamera is getting ready to marry the man of her dreams, and her twin sister Tia is pregnant with her first child. The sisters are struggling to find time for one another amongst all the chaos, and Tamera doesn't think Tia is fulfilling her duties as her maid of honor. Tamera wants to give her best friend Andrea the official title, but Tia won't relinquish her spot without a fight. Plus, Tia's morning sickness lands her in the hospital.
2	2	"Last Fling Before the Ring"	August 15, 2011
As Tamera prepares for her bachelorette weekend in Santa Barbara, her excitement turns to disappointment when Tia tells her she is too pregnant to party and may miss out on the festivities. Then, a follow-up meeting with celebrity wedding planner Mindy Weiss stresses out Tamera because she's thousands of dollars over her original budget. Meanwhile, Tia has a tough time deciding on a birthing plan and whether or not she will give birth at home or in a hospital.
3	3	"Wedding Forecast: Rain"	August 22, 2011
With just a few days to go before her Napa destination wedding, Tamera still has lots to do and she's feeling overwhelmed. Instead of focusing on helping her sister, Tia has plans to use Tamera's wedding weekend as a romantic babymoon getaway for her and Cory. When the drive takes much longer than planned, she isn't able to make time for her and Cory or her sister. Meanwhile, Tamera fears her dream wedding will turn into a wet disaster when the forecast calls for heavy rain on her big day.
4	4	"Family Feud"	August 29, 2011
Newlywed Tamera returns from her honeymoon and has her mind set on becoming the perfect wife, so she takes a cooking class and attempts to do her hubby Adam's laundry. Things don't go exactly as planned, and she starts to question her domestic skills. Meanwhile, the sisters finally vent their frustrations to each other regarding the wedding weekend, but Tamera is left in tears when emotions boil over. Also, Tia tries everything to get her baby to turn the right way for delivery, as it's in the breech position.
5	5	"Two's a Crowd"	September 12, 2011
Now that they're married, Adam finally moves into Tamera's house, but Tamera has a hard time learning how to share her space with her new husband. She turns to her friends and therapist for advice, and eventually enlists the help of an interior designer to help merge her and her hubby's different decorating styles. Meanwhile, Tia's baby remains in the breech position, and she must decide whether or not to try a risky treatment to turn her baby around. Plus, Tia gets emotional at her baby shower and continues to become more self-conscious about her weight.
6	6	"Acting the Part"	September 19, 2011
With two weeks to go before her scheduled C-section, Tia's doctor puts her on bed rest, forcing her to wait out her remaining days in her home. Unable to do much, Tia is overwhelmed by all the things she still needs to do and hires a high-profile designer to decorate her baby's nursery. Meanwhile, Tamera prepares herself to re-enter the acting game after taking six months off to plan her wedding and enjoy life as a newlywed, but first she must tackle her anxiety about venturing out of her comfort zone of comedy by attempting darker and more dramatic roles.
7	7	"Sisters Under Pressure"	September 26, 2011
Tamera gets a call from her manager asking her to co-host Access Hollywood. After mulling over the idea, Tia convinces Tamera to take the gig—but when she finds out the show is taped live, her nerves really kick in. Meanwhile, Tia is under doctor's orders to remain on bed rest until her scheduled C-section—but she stresses out over a laundry list of things to take care of before the baby's arrival. When Tamera offers to help her out, it's both a blessing and a curse. Plus, Tamera gets inspired to do something nice for the armed forces, and Tia and Cory struggle to find a pediatrician who shares their same beliefs on infant vaccinations.
8	8	"You, Me & Baby Makes 3"	October 3, 2011
Tia finally gives birth to her son Cree and adjusts to life as a new mom. She quickly becomes overwhelmed when she only has weeks to move her family to Atlanta where she will begin shooting a new season of The Game, find a new house and shed her baby weight in order to be camera-ready! Meanwhile, Tamera starts thinking about starting a family of her own, but wonders if she may be jumping into it too fast.

=== Season 2 (2012–13) ===
No. overall	No. in season	Title	Original release date
9	1	"Sister Secrets"	June 11, 2012
The second season begins with Tia struggling to be a full-time mom and Tamera trying to split her time between her Napa home and Los Angeles without hindering her career.
10	2	"New York, New Image"	June 18, 2012
The girls travel to New York City, where Tamera struggles to present a more grown-up image of herself to fashion-magazine editors. Meanwhile, Tia sets out to prove to her sister that moms know how to have fun.
11	3	"Are You Jealous?"	June 25, 2012
Tamera struggles to find balance between her life in Los Angeles and her new home in Napa. Tia's "to do" list overwhelms her before she leaves to star in a Christmas musical movie, Tamera's dream role.
12	4	"The Cree-Cree Crawl"	July 2, 2012
Tia's work schedule causes her to miss an important motherhood moment. Tamera burns the candle at both ends as she decorates her Napa home and auditions for TV pilots.
13	5	"Lights, Camera, Confrontation"	July 9, 2012
Tamera and Jerome visit Tia in Utah and give her the family support she needs while she's making a movie and trying to be a good mom for Cree.
14	6	"Holey Mole-y"	July 16, 2012
Tia worries about a potentially dangerous mole. Tamera contemplates expanding her family and babysits Cree
15	7	"Failure to Communicate"	July 23, 2012
Tia teaches Cree baby sign language, and Tamera prepares to deliver a speech to high-school students. Meanwhile, the sisters seek professional help to better communicate with each other.
16	8	"Bye-Bye Baby Belly"	July 30, 2012
Tamera considers moving, and Tia struggles with her body image. Later, the twins mentor young performers during a fashion fund-raiser.
17	9	"Too Much Napa Whine"	August 13, 2012
Tamera prepares for a housewarming party. Tia deals with separation anxiety when she leaves Cree for the first time.
18	10	"South Africa"	August 20, 2012
Tamera treks to South Africa, where she faces wild animals via a safari and dives with great white sharks.
19	11	"Are You Pregnant?"	August 27, 2012
An exciting discovery comes Tamera's way, but she must keep the big news a secret. Meanwhile, Tia anticipates her first Mother's Day, but preparations for her inaugural book tour cause complications.
20	12	"Game, Over"	October 16, 2012
Tia faces a big decision about her role on The Game. Tamera struggles with being a working mom when she begins shooting a television movie.
21	13	"Happy Birthday Cree Cree"	October 23, 2012
Tia plans a birthday party for Cree. Tamera tries to determine if her dog is sick when it starts acting strange.
22	14	"Bahamas Mamas"	October 30, 2012
Tia and Tamera visit the Bahamas to learn more about their ancestry
23	15	"Almost Naked and Famous"	November 13, 2012
Tamera opens a shop to benefit a local charity. Meanwhile, Tia struggles with posing for a bikini photo shoot and tries to find a solution to Cree's restless sleeping patterns.
24	16	"Doula Right Thing"	November 20, 2012
Tia plants a garden and receives an unexpected job offer. Tamera hires a doula as she plans for a natural childbirth.
25	17	"Adventures in Baby Showers"	November 27, 2012
Tia plans a baby shower for Tamera. Later, Tamera brews a lactation tea.
26	18	"Tussle & Flow"	December 4, 2012
Tamera gets involved with Jerome's recording session and builds a baby nursery. Meanwhile, Tia makes a yoga video.
27	19	"Twindividuals"	December 11, 2012
Tia and Tamera comment on their favorite moments from the series.
28	20	"Twinventors"	December 18, 2012
Tia and Tamera work on a lactation drink. Tamera worries about postpartum depression and debates whether or not to post pregnancy pictures of herself on the Internet.
29	21	"Stripteased"	January 8, 2013
Tia takes a provocative dancing class to keep the fire alive in her marriage. Tamera plans a final night out with the girls before the baby is born.
30	22	"Overdue and Over It!"	January 15, 2013
Tamera prepares for her baby's arrival, but fails to involve her sister in last-minute preparations while Tia gets bad news about her television project.

=== Season 3 (2013) ===
No. overall	No. in season	Title	Original release date
–	0	"A Tale of Two Sisters"	July 7, 2013
Highlights from the show's first two seasons.
31	1	"V-Steam My What?!"	July 14, 2013
Tamera works with a friend to create a sitcom. Tia goes to a red-carpet event while she waits for news regarding her pilot.
32	2	"My Wife's a Stripper?"	July 21, 2013
Tia is a little offended when an employee at a yogurt place calls her ma'am. Tamera receives a call from her publicist saying that she was invited to Vegas for a celebrity poker night for charity. Tia and Tamera decide to have some girlfriends come over for a night of poker fun. Tia is also invited to participate in a burlesque show. Tamera doesn't think it's a good idea, especially since Tia is dancing in front of other men while married.
33	3	"The House Always Wins"	July 28, 2013
The twins and their girls go to Las Vegas for a weekend charity poker game. Tamera's husband has an event the same day as Tia's poker game. Tamera wants to support Adam and be by his side for such an important time in his life. While in Vegas, the ladies attend rag Shows, eat at buffets, and hang out by the pool. Tia finds out that her pilot for a show on NickMom has been picked up. She also finds out that Tamera may start on a project with a good friend. During the charity game, Tia and her friend who stepped in for Tamera make it to the second round of the tournament. The charity raised $100,000.
34	4	"Sistervention"	August 4, 2013
Tamera is forced to skip Tia's celebration party for her pilot when she encounters health issues. Tia and Jerome go out for an adventurous zip lining trip. Tia works to give Tamera's closet a makeover.
35	5	"Boot Camp Brawl"	August 11, 2013
Tia becomes unsatisfied with her weight after some images are posted on the internet, which leads to her signing up for a weight loss boot camp with Tamera and Jerome also taking part.
36	6	"Mo' Baby Mo' Problems"	August 18, 2013
Tia wants to have another child, but fears the time may not be right as she prepares to begin work on her new series. Tamera faces stiff competition at an audition for a talk show.
37	7	"Raising Cree"	August 25, 2013
The sisters have differing opinions on how to handle their maternity brand. Tia plans her will and visits a fertility specialist.
38	8	"The Truth About the Twins"	September 8, 2013
Tia takes a DNA test when Tamera suspects she and her sister may not be identical twins. The sisters disagree on a scent for a new product. At the end of the episode, the DNA test confirms that they are identical twins.
39	9	"Dine at the Y"	September 15, 2013
Tamera must make some difficult changes when her talk show is picked up. Tia takes part in an ad campaign for an animal-rights organization.
40	10	"Twerkin' 9 to 5"	September 22, 2013
Tamera worries about making her voice heard among the four co-hosts of her new talk show. Tia misses Cory while she works on her sitcom.

== Ratings ==
At the time, the series premiere was the most-watched series premiere for Style Network and the second most watched Style Network telecast ever in key demos. The episode averaged 1.5 million viewers for its combined two airings. The second episode climbed to new highs with 920,000 viewers and a 0.5 rating in adults 18–49 demo. The first season was also Style Network’s most-watched original series, at the time, by acquiring 775,000 total viewers. At the end of July 2012, Tia & Tamera averaged 450,000 total viewers during its second season. The third season premiered with 491,000 viewers.
