= Shake It Up season 1 =

Shake It Up
- Season 1
- No. of episodes: 21

Release
- Original network: Disney Channel
- Original release: November 7, 2010 – August 21, 2011

Season chronology
- Next → Season 2

The first season of Shake It Up aired on Disney Channel from November 7, 2010 to August 21, 2011. The series revolves around two best friends, CeCe Jones (Bella Thorne) and Rocky Blue (Zendaya) as they try to deal with the pitfalls of being on the famous TV show Shake It Up, Chicago. Throughout the series, they try to keep their head in the game when it comes to school, babysitting, and being on time and prepared to perform on the show. This season filmed from July 2010 to March 2011. The pilot episode was filmed in February 2010.

The first season consisted of 21 episodes. Bella Thorne and Zendaya appear in all of them. Davis Cleveland was absent for two episodes, Adam Irigoyen was absent for three, Roshon Fegan was absent for four and Kenton Duty was absent for nine.

== Premise ==
Two best friends, Rocky Blue (Zendaya) and CeCe Jones (Bella Thorne) become dancing stars on their favorite show Shake It Up, Chicago with the help of Rocky's older brother, Ty (Roshon Fegan) and the girl's closest friend Deuce Martinez (Adam Irigoyen). Besides their career, they have to deal with the disadvantages of being on the show, such as keeping up with school, watching out for CeCe's younger brother, Flynn (Davis Cleveland), and dealing with other issues that involve being on the show. They also deal with their competing frenemies, Gunther and Tinka Hessenheffer (Kenton Duty and Caroline Sunshine), who usually annoy Rocky, CeCe, and the rest of the gang, but they sometimes bond with the group on certain occasions. The opening theme "Shake It Up" is performed by Selena Gomez and is included on the debut soundtrack of the series.

== Production and release ==
The series was announced in late 2009 with casting auditions in October 2009. It was originally titled Dance, Dance Chicago, but it was officially announced on May 21, 2010 that the show was going to be called Shake It Up. Bella Thorne and Zendaya were cast as the female leads with Roshon Fegan from Camp Rock as a co-lead. Production of the series started in July 2010 and ended in March 2011. The series officially premiered on November 7, 2010 after the Hannah Montana one-hour special episode and Disney Channel ordered 21 episodes to roll out throughout the first season.

== Music ==
The debut soundtrack "Shake It Up: Break It Down" was released on July 12, 2011 as a 2 Disc CD + DVD combo and was released in European countries as Shake It Up: Dance Dance. "Shake It Up" was released as the first single from the album on February 15, 2011 and "Watch Me" was re-recorded by Bella Thorne and Zendaya in April 2011 and was later released as the second single on June 21, 2011 with an accompanying music video released on June 17, 2011 during the premiere of A.N.T. Farm.

=== Opening sequence ===
The opening theme starts with Rocky and CeCe on the front porch doing a dance routine (a clip from the beginning of "Hook It Up"), then showing clips of the cast members that are included in the episodes of the first season, starting off with Zendaya and Bella Thorne, then going in order with Davis Cleveland, Roshon Fegan, Adam Irigoyen, and Kenton Duty. It then shows more various clips of the cast members as it gives credit to the creator of the series, Chris Thompson. A final clip shows Rocky and CeCe doing a small dance routine on the stage of Shake It Up, Chicago with the series title next to them.

== Cast ==
=== Main ===
- Bella Thorne as CeCe Jones
- Zendaya as Rocky Blue
- Davis Cleveland as Flynn Jones
- Roshon Fegan as Ty Blue
- Adam Irigoyen as Deuce Martinez
- Kenton Duty as Gunther Hessenheffer

=== Recurring ===
- Caroline Sunshine as Tinka Hessenheffer

== Episodes ==
No. overall	No. in season	Title	Directed by	Written by	Original release date	Prod. code	US viewers (millions)
1	1	"Start It Up"	Shelley Jensen	Chris Thompson	November 7, 2010	101	6.20
Best friends Rocky Blue and CeCe Jones audition for the dance show, Shake It Up, Chicago. Rocky and CeCe do a spotlight dance and Rocky makes it in. Unfortunately, CeCe gets stage fright and doesn't make it in. The following morning, Rocky stays in her PJ's and it is CeCe who convinces her to get changed and go on the show. On what is to be her first appearance on the show, Rocky decides she does not want to participate since CeCe did not make it as well. CeCe forces Rocky to show up anyway as it has been their lifelong dream to dance on Shake It Up, Chicago. CeCe accompanies Rocky to the studio and just when Rocky is about to go on she handcuffs herself to CeCe so they both have to dance during the filming of the show. The host, Gary Wilde, sees them dancing and decide that they both have the "it" factor and he keeps both of them on the show. Guest stars: Caroline Sunshine as Tinka, R. Brandon Johnson as Gary Wilde, Anita Barone as Officer Jones, Matthew Scott Montgomery as stage manager Songs featured: "Scratch" by Beach Girl5, "Roll the Dice" by Marlene Strand, "Watch Me" by Margaret Durante, "Our Generation" by Sibel Redzep, "All the Way" by Alana de Fonseca
2	2	"Meatball It Up"	Shelley Jensen	John D. Beck & Ron Hart	November 14, 2010	104	4.09
Rocky and CeCe get their first paychecks and having their own debit cards. The nice man who gave them their cards promises to be friends with the girls and gives them loads of free things. Rocky and CeCe spend money on themselves instead of Deuce and Ty, so they treat them to The Olive Pit. At the restaurant CeCe and Rocky's cards are overdrawn, resulting in them into eating The "Big Fat Heart Attack," spaghetti with a big meatball in order to let all of the orders be free. Meanwhile, Gunther and Tinka are babysitting Flynn and he tricks them into housekeeping and giving him half the pay. Georgia Jones isn't that angry as she loves coming home to clean dishes. At the end of the episode, Gary treats the Cast of Shake It Up, Chicago to a huge lunch from the Olive Pit. When Gary introduces CeCe and Rocky to meatballs, they get sick. Guest stars: Caroline Sunshine as Tinka, R. Brandon Johnson as Gary Wilde, Anita Barone as Georgia, Jack Plotnick as Phil, Jodi Taffel as Waitress Song featured: "We Right Here" by Drew Ryan Scott
3	3	"Give It Up"	Shelley Jensen	Rob Lotterstein	November 21, 2010	103	4.28
Rocky and CeCe decides to do a marathon in Shake It Up! Chicago so CeCe can get the Spotlight Dance and Rocky can donate money to a retirement home and also impress an elderly lady who hates her. CeCe gets energy drinks because the rules are to keep dancing on the floor without falling down. However Flynn drinks all of the energy drinks and becomes energetic and that Rocky and CeCe are too tired stopping Flynn. At the marathon, they nearly feel sleepy but thanks to Deuce, who gave them lightning pants, they win the marathon but end up sleeping at the end. When they win the spotlight dance, they fall asleep and Flynn dances, but then falls to the ground, asleep. Guest stars: Caroline Sunshine as Tinka, R. Brandon Johnson as Gary Wilde, Renée Taylor as Mrs. Locassio Songs featured: "Watch Me" by Bella Thorne & Zendaya, "Our Generation" by Sibel Redzep
4	4	"Add It Up"	Shelley Jensen	Eileen Conn	November 28, 2010	105	3.80
CeCe finds herself in trouble when she learns that she is failing Algebra so Deuce finds her a tutor. Georgia tells CeCe that if she doesn't bring her grades up, she will have to quit "Shake It Up Chicago". When the tutor shows up at CeCe's house, CeCe, who was expecting a college boy, finds out that the tutor is a child genius in college named Henry. Flynn then "breaks" CeCe's algebra tutor when Flynn shares hair gel with Henry and starts playing video games with him. When a fed-up Rocky offers her own tutoring services, Henry drops the bomb that CeCe is dyslexic. CeCe flees the apartment in tears. CeCe accepts that she'll be grounded for failing Algebra and will have to leave "Shake It Up Chicago" for good. Meanwhile, Gunther convinces Ty to go on a date with Tinka because Gunther thinks Tinka feels lonely. Ty ends up enjoying their date. They dance and think about going out again. Gunther and Deuce bet on arm wrestling. They bet on Deuce's clothes, and when CeCe is cheered up by Rocky about not being embarrassed of her dyslexia, they ask Deuce why he's walking around in just a sleeveless shirt and in his boxers. Thanks to Rocky, CeCe is able to bring her grade in Algebra up to a B and remains on "Shake It Up Chicago". Guest stars: Caroline Sunshine as Tinka, R. Brandon Johnson as Gary Wilde, Anita Barone as Georgia Jones, Buddy Handleson as Henry Dillon Song featured: "It's Alive" by Nayana Holley Note: This was Buddy Handleson's first appearance as a recurring character playing Henry Dillon. "Add It Up" reveals that CeCe has dyslexia. Bella Thorne was diagnosed with dyslexia in real life.
5	5	"Kick It Up"	Shelley Jensen	Ron Zimmerman	December 5, 2010	107	4.26
After CeCe ruins Deuce's and Rocky's dates at the movie theater (though Rocky does not care), Deuce points out that CeCe and Rocky are too joined together like Gunther and Tinka. So, CeCe decides to be separated from her for a little while. After some desperate calls to some old friends, including her grandmother, CeCe runs into Rocky and sees that she has already made new friends at her karate class and CeCe is afraid she may lose her best friend. CeCe hangs out with Tinka who tells her that Gunther and her are individuals, just individuals together. Meanwhile, Flynn enlists his new friend, Henry, to join his karate class to help fend off bullies. Guest stars: Caroline Sunshine as Tinka, Kent Boyd from So You Think You Can Dance as himself, Buddy Handleson as Henry Dillon, Fred Stoller as Sensei Ira Song featured: "All Electric" by Anna Margaret and Nevermind Absent: Roshon Fegan as Ty Blue
6	6	"Age It Up"	Shelley Jensen	Rob Lotterstein	December 9, 2010	108	N/A
When Rocky and CeCe get to dance with teen sensation Justin Starr, they go to his apartment and rehearse, but when Rocky and CeCe are expected to leave, Rocky wants to stay because she wants to take a picture with Justin Starr's hat. Unfortunately, CeCe catches Justin making out with his manager. CeCe then tries sending the picture to her mom, thinking that she may have a solution to the problem, but she accidentally sends it to everyone on her contact list. Later, they go to apologize to Justin, but instead of being mad at them, he thanked them, revealing to them that he's not 16, but 24 years old and that his manager is his wife. Meanwhile, Ty tries to make Gunther more "hip", after being rejected by a popular cheerleader. Later, Gunther realizes that he doesn't need to change to impress a girl after Danielle states that Tinka is a reject. Guest stars: Caroline Sunshine as Tinka, R. Brandon Johnson as Gary Wilde, Stephanie Lemelin as Karen, Chris Trousdale as Justin Starr, Kiersey Clemons as Danielle, Breaksk8 from America's Best Dance Crew as featured dancers Song featured: "Not Too Young" by Chris Trousdale and Nevermind Note: This is the first and only episode to premiere on a Thursday night. Absent: Davis Cleveland as Flynn Jones, Adam Irigoyen as Deuce Martinez
7	7	"Party It Up"	Shelley Jensen	Jenny Lee	December 12, 2010	106	3.70
When Rocky and CeCe finds out a dancer can't make it to Gary's party, they plan to take her place. Georgia refuses to let her daughter attend the party and tells the girls that they're too young to go to Gary's party. Georgia explains to CeCe that she's trying to protect her from getting hurt. CeCe and Rocky disobey Georgia and sneak out to the party. When they get there though they find out that they aren't guests, but are there to serve the guests. Meanwhile, Ty and Deuce are left babysitting Flynn, but when CeCe's mom comes home, due to a scheduling mix up, they both try to hide, but CeCe's mom catches them trying to leave. CeCe's mom later finds out that the girls sneaked out, after forcing the boys to drink tons of water, and goes after them. The girls get caught and Georgia shows up to take them home. The next day, Georgia makes Rocky, CeCe, Ty, Deuce, Flynn, and even Gary clean the house. Guest stars: R. Brandon Johnson as Gary Wilde, Anita Barone as Georgia Jones, Mitch Holleman as Xavier, Garrett Clayton as Dylan, Danielle Yu as Model Songs featured: "Breakout" by Margaret Durante, "Roll the Dice" by Marlene Strand Notes: This episode, along with the So Random! episode "Colbie Caillat" has been pulled as of December 23, 2011 and is being reevaluated due to eating disorder references. However, the episode appears to have been put back into rotation as of April 2012, with the previously mentioned references removed. Absent: Kenton Duty as Gunther Hessenheffer
8	8	"Hook It Up"	Shelley Jensen	Chris Thompson	December 19, 2010	102	N/A
CeCe and Rocky invite their friend Deuce to videotape them for a school project and he overhears Gary Wilde deciding whether or not to fire two dancers. Fearing that it could be CeCe and Rocky, he shows them the footage and the two set out to prove to Gary Wilde that they should get as much recognition as the dancers who have been on the show before. Little that they know that they weren't the last ones hired and that Gary wasn't planning to take them off the show. Meanwhile, Ty teaches Flynn how to do some dance steps to impress an older girl. Guest stars: Caroline Sunshine as Tinka, R. Brandon Johnson as Gary Wilde, Allie DeBerry as Destiny Song featured: "All The Way Up" by Alana de Fonseca
9	9	"Wild It Up"	Joel Zwick	Chris Thompson	January 9, 2011	110	4.07
Rocky tries to change her image when she reads a blog that labels her a "goody-two-shoes". The next day, she tries to prove that she's bad by being disrespectful to and ultimately pranking the school's newly-arrived vice principal. Meanwhile, Flynn and Deuce try to catch a mouse on the loose in the Jones' apartment. Guest stars: Cat Deeley, the host of So You Think You Can Dance as Vice Principal Winslow, Thomas Kasp as Frankie "The Complication", Saltare from America's Best Dance Crew as featured dancers Song featured: "We Right Here" by Drew Ryan Scott Absent: Roshon Fegan as Ty Blue, Kenton Duty as Gunther Hessenheffer
10	10	"Match It Up"	Joel Zwick	Rob Lotterstein	January 23, 2011	111	4.31
CeCe attempts to play matchmaker and set up Deuce with a girl named Dina, who has a personality similar to Deuce's. Meanwhile, Deuce is happy with Savannah, but when Savannah finds someone with more money than Deuce, she dumps him. Deuce later announces that he and Savannah are back together, but he doesn't realize that she's only reconciled with him because he won a contest that gives him a chance to win $10,000. Ty disguised himself as a billionaire to show Deuce that Savannah is a gold digger. When Savannah starts to flirt with Ty, Savannah and Deuce break up and Deuce gets together with Dina. Meanwhile, Flynn helps Henry earn a Coyote Scout camping badge, but sadly Henry is hopeless. Guest stars: R. Brandon Johnson as Gary Wilde, Juliette Goglia as Savannah, Ainsley Bailey as Dina Garcia Song featured: "Bling Bling" by Windy Wagner Absent: Kenton Duty as Gunther Hessenheffer
11	11	"Show It Up"	Joel Zwick	Eileen Conn	February 20, 2011	112	3.96
Rocky is determined to beat perennial champions Randy and Candy at the talent show after Candy wins every single award. Upon realizing that they will lose against Candy and her fellow cheerleaders, they enlist Gunter and Tinka to dance with them in the show but Candy and Randy recruit them for their team soon after. CeCe does not give up and brings in her secret weapon Ty. Meanwhile, Flynn helps Deuce prepare to MC the show. Guest stars: Caroline Sunshine as Tinka, Charlet Chung as Candy Cho Songs featured: "We Right Here" by Drew Ryan Scott, "All the Way Up (instrumental) by Alana de Fonseca
12	12	"Heat It Up"	Katy Garretson	John D. Beck & Ron Hart	February 27, 2011	109	3.73
When the heat goes out in Rocky’s apartment, CeCe invites Rocky, Ty, and their mother to move in with them. Meanwhile, Ty builds himself a man cave to get away from the women of the house. Tinka hopes that something will hatch from an egg that she's "raising". Guest stars: Caroline Sunshine as Tinka, Anita Barone as Georgia Jones, Carla Renata as Marcie Blue Song Featured: "Breakout" (instrumental) by Margaret Durante Absent: Adam Irigoyen as Deuce Martinez, Kenton Duty as Gunther Hessenheffer
13	13	"Glitz It Up"	Eric Dean Seaton	Ron Zimmerman	March 6, 2011	113	3.82
Rocky and CeCe choreograph and mentor young contestants for a beauty pageant. When the girls meet some of the pageants, natural model Sally Van Buren and the shy, yet friendly, Eileen Keller, they end up clashing over which young girl they believe is most capable of winning the pageant, with Cece taking Sally's side and Rocky taking Eileen's side. Meanwhile, Deuce tries to win over Dina's father by taking a special test: taking care of his beloved pet pig, Pinky, for a day. Guest stars: R. Brandon Johnson as Gary Wilde, Caitlin Carmichael as Eileen Keller, Emily Skinner as Sally Van Buren, Ainsley Bailey as Dina Garcia, John D'Aquino as Don Rio Garcia Song featured: "All Electric" by Anna Margaret and Nevermind Absent: Davis Cleveland as Flynn Jones, Roshon Fegan as Ty Blue, Kenton Duty as Gunther Hessenheffer
14	14	"Hot Mess It Up"	Eric Dean Seaton	John D. Beck & Ron Hart	March 20, 2011	114	3.64
Rocky and CeCe host a video webcast offering teen advice. When CeCe gives some bad advice to "Lonely Boy", his twin sister "Glitter Girl" wrote an email stating that it was their fault they made her twin brother move away who might be Gunther and Tinka. Meanwhile, the boys host an advice show of their own called "Zombie Talk". Guest stars: Caroline Sunshine as Tinka, R. Brandon Johnson as Gary Wilde, Poreotics from America's Best Dance Crew as featured dancers Songs featured: "Breakout" by Margaret Durante, "Not Too Young" by Chris Trousdale and Nevermind, "We Right Here" by Drew Ryan Scott, "Bling Bling" by Windy Wagner, "It's Alive" by Nayana Holley, "Roll the Dice" by Marlene Strand, "Our Generation" (instrumental) by Sibel Redzep
15	15	"Reunion It Up"	Sean McNamara	Howard J. Morris	April 10, 2011	116	3.67
CeCe and Rocky get the chance to dance with Ronnie and Angie, two of the original dancers of Shake It Up, Chicago. Meanwhile, Deuce accidentally kills Flynn's goldfish, Mr. Goldberg, and plans a proper funeral for Mr. Goldberg. Guest stars: Anneliese van der Pol as Ronnie, Meagan Holder as Angie, R. Brandon Johnson as Gary Wilde Song featured: "Our Generation" by Sibel Redzep Absent: Kenton Duty as Gunther Hessenheffer
16	16	"Sweat It Up"	Joel Zwick	David Tolentino	May 1, 2011	117	3.11
CeCe fakes a leg injury in order to avoid participating in gym class. Rocky lies and says that she is having her appendix removed to avoid laser tag with the nerds. Meanwhile, the boys take care of a neighbor's dog, but the dog proves to be difficult. Guest stars:: R. Brandon Johnson as Gary Wilde, Anita Barone as Georgia Jones, Zayne Emory as Howard, Jamie Kaler as Coach Lesseur, Wendy Worthington as Ms. Lee Song featured: "Just Wanna Dance" by Geraldo Sandell and Riky Luna Absent: Kenton Duty as Gunther Hessenheffer
17	17	"Vatalihootsit It Up"	Joel Zwick	John D. Beck & Ron Hart	June 12, 2011	118	3.27
Gunther and Tinka invite CeCe and Rocky to come visit their home and celebrate Vatalihootsit Day with them. However, the girls have a difficult time adjusting to the traditions and culture of the Hessenheffer's native home in addition to the initial awkwardness of making a good impression on their eccentric parents. In the end, CeCe and Rocky end up changing their minds about their experience, but Gunther and Tinka kick them out once the celebration is over. Meanwhile, Ty auditions for a juice commercial, but the producer ends up casting Flynn instead. Guest stars: Bronson Pinchot as Kashlack Hessenheffer, Mary Birdsong as Squizza Hessenheffer, Caroline Sunshine as Tinka Hessenheffer, R. Brandon Johnson as Gary Wilde, JabbaWockeeZ from America's Best Dance Crew as featured dancers. Song featured: "Dance for Life" by Adam Hicks and Drew Seeley Note: This episode premiered on Disney Channel UK on May 7, 2011, over a month before the US premiere. Absent: Adam Irigoyen as Deuce Martinez
18	18	"Model It Up"	Eric Dean Seaton	Jenny Lee	June 17, 2011	115	4.11
Rocky and CeCe get a chance at a modeling career but the people only like Rocky. So she gets a chance to be a model for Glam Magazine, but it's in New York. Rocky is hesitant to go, but her friends all encourage her to go, saying that it is a big chance for her. Meanwhile, the boys have to do chores for Mrs. Locassio because Deuce and Ty broke Flynn's video game console and they have to get money to get him a new one. Guest stars: Jungle Boogie from America's Best Dance Crew as featured dancers, R. Brandon Johnson as Gary Wilde Song featured: "Roll the Dice" by Marlene Strand Note: This episode aired on a special timeslot due to Disney Channel having Night of Premieres on June 17.
19	19	"Twist It Up"	Shelley Jensen	Eileen Conn	July 10, 2011	119	3.69
CeCe and Rocky start a new dance craze. Mrs. Garcia wants to throw a huge party for Dina's birthday, but Dina wants a simple, small party, so CeCe and Rocky take over organizing Dina's party. Meanwhile, Flynn gets a new robot that destroys things with its laser eyes, and he gets his friend Henry to help him. Deuce tries to impress Mrs. Garcia by learning some dance moves from Ty. Guest stars: R. Brandon Johnson as Gary Wilde, Buddy Handleson as Henry Dillon, Ainsley Bailey as Dina Garcia, Maggie Wheeler as Mrs. Garcia Song featured: "Twist My Hips" by Tim James and Nevermind Absent: Kenton Duty as Gunther Hessenheffer
20	20	"Break It Up"	Shelley Jensen	Teleplay by : Jenny Lee; Story by : Chris Thompson	July 24, 2011	121	4.06
Rocky, CeCe, Flynn, Ty, Deuce, Gunther and Tinka all go on a vacation together. When they play Truth or Dare, CeCe dares Rocky to jump in the lake. Rocky does the dare, but ends up landing on a broken bottle, thereby cutting her foot. Guest stars: Jackie Debatin as Dr. Semple, Caroline Sunshine as Tinka Hessenheffer, R. Brandon Johnson as Gary Wilde, Anita Barone as Georgia Jones, Carla Renata as Marcie Blue Song featured: "School's Out" by Kyra Cristiaan
21	21	"Throw It Up"	Shelley Jensen	Rob Lotterstein	August 21, 2011	120	3.43
CeCe and Rocky get the opportunity to perform a big spotlight dance number alongside a British dance crew, "The Highlighters". Right before the performance, Gary gets sick, leaving Rocky and CeCe in charge of the show. Guest stars: Caroline Sunshine as Tinka, R. Brandon Johnson as Gary Wilde, Anita Barone as Georgia Jones, Cameron Boyce as Fake Highlighter Songs featured: "Watch Me" by Bella Thorne & Zendaya, "Dance For Life" by Adam Hicks and Drew Seeley, "School's Out" by Kyra Cristiaan, "Season 1 Mash up" by Various Absent: Roshon Fegan as Ty Blue, Kenton Duty as Gunther Hessenheffer
