= Start It Up (Shake It Up) =

- Shake It Up episode
- Episode no.: Season 1 Episode 1
- Directed by: Shelley Jensen
- Written by: Chris Thompson
- Cinematography by: Bryan Hays
- Editing by: Kris Trexler
- Production code: 101
- Original air date: November 7, 2010

Guest appearances
- Caroline Sunshine as Tinka Hessenheffer; R. Brandon Johnson as Gary Wilde; Anita Barone as Georgia Jones; Matthew Scott Montgomery as A.D.

Episode chronology
← Previous —	Next → "Meatball It Up"

"Start It Up" is the pilot episode of the American television series Shake It Up, a female buddy-show with a dance concept, starring Bella Thorne and Zendaya. As the series' opening episode, it introduces the main characters in the series, and follows Rocky (Zendaya Coleman) and CeCe (Bella Thorne) as they try out for "Shake It Up Chicago", after being encouraged by Deuce (Adam Irigoyen) and Ty (Roshon Fegan). Also in this episode, Flynn (Davis Cleveland) tries to avenge CeCe and Rocky for his breakfast.

The episode premiered on the Disney Channel on November 7, 2010. It was directed by Shelley Jensen and written by series creator Chris Thompson. The episode features four original songs recorded for the series. It was watched by approximately 6.2 million viewers, becoming Disney's highest rated series premiere in the history of the channel’s run and surpassed the series premiere of Hannah Montana on March 24, 2006. The episode was also the seventh most-watched cable event on television on the Sunday it aired.

== Plot ==
The episode introduces the characters of Rocky Blue (Zendaya) and CeCe Jones (Bella Thorne). They appear in a group of people waiting at a subway stop, as Rocky plays her boombox and they attempt to dance for money. They give a rousing performance, which gets everyone in the crowd dancing as well. When they are done, the performance is received with applause, however, after receiving the hat they passed around, Rocky sees that they have only earned a dime. After telling the crowd that they want money for cell phones, and an operation, they pass around the hat again, only to see that their dime is gone.

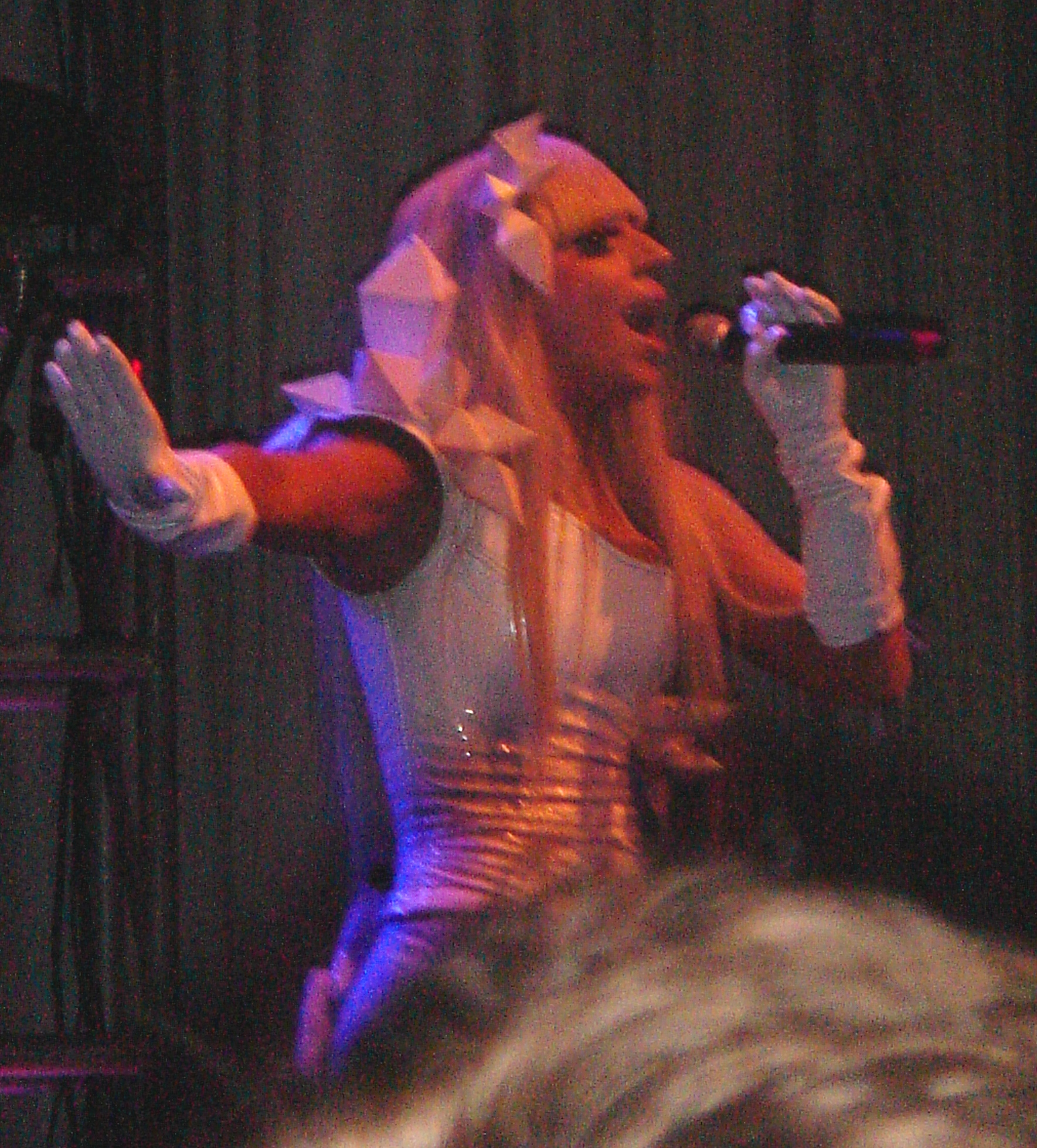
"Start It Up" is one of the multiple Shake It Up episodes that reference pop singer Lady Gaga.

Next, the girls get ready for school, and CeCe does her daily ritual of yelling out her apartment window for Rocky, who lives on the floor above, to get ready for school. While preparing for school, "Shake it Up Chicago" appears on television, and CeCe dances along to it. CeCe's mother, Georgia (Anita Barone), who is a police officer, and her brother Flynn (Davis Cleveland). When Georgia orders CeCe to fix breakfast for Flynn, Rocky arrives through the window, to rush CeCe to catch the subway for school. In a rush, the duo prepare a "one-minute breakfast" for Flynn, mixing his cereal in a blender and putting it in a bag. As they arrive at school, their friend Deuce (Adam Irigoyen) is introduced, offering them bootleg Lady Gaga concert tickets. He then tells them about an opportunity to audition on their favorite show, "Shake it Up Chicago." After deciding to go to the auditions, their rivals, Gunther and Tinka Hessenheffer (Kenton Duty and Caroline Sunshine), are introduced, and they tell CeCe and Rocky their plans of trying out for the show as well.

Before going to the auditions, Rocky has an impromptu dance-off with her brother, Ty (Roshon Fegan). CeCe encourages him to try out also, but he says that he "doesn't dance for the man." Both do well in their preliminary auditions, and Rocky shines during the solo round. However, CeCe gets stage fright and ends up running off stage. Rocky finds her crying at the subway stop, embarrassed and referring to herself as a loser. When CeCe brings up how Rocky is better and names all of her good qualities, Rocky replies with things good about CeCe. CeCe then accompanies Rocky on "Shake it Up Chicago" to support her. Rocky then tries to get CeCe onstage with her, and when she refuses, Rocky uses Georgia's handcuffs to make her come and they dance onstage together. After the segment is over, the show's host, Gary Wilde (R. Brandon Johnson) decides to let CeCe join the show as well. Trying to unlock the handcuffs, Rocky realizes they are gone. Flynn took the keys in retaliation for their "one-minute breakfast" prepared for him.

== Production ==
=== Development ===
The show was ordered up as Disney's attempt in its first female buddy show, but with a dance-driven aspect. Initially carrying the working title Dance, Dance Chicago, the original description was described as the journey of two kids on a contemporary American Bandstand-type show. Veteran television producers Chris Thompson and Rob Lotterstein were assigned to work on the story. Casting for the show began in October 2009. Bella Thorne and Zendaya were cast as the two female leads, as well as Camp Rock cast member Roshon Fegan in a co-lead role. President of Disney Entertainment, Gary Marsh said the Thorne/Zendaya duo were the most engaging best friends they had seen on the network. On what makes the show different, Marsh said "while buddy comedies have been around since the start of television," that "this is the first time anyone has incorporated dancing into the underlying premise of a sitcom." The concept of the show has been noted to be very similar to that of fellow Disney Channel series Hannah Montana, and according to The Sun-Sentinel, Shake It Up is the same approach with dance. Additionally, the show is Disney's second series to have a show-within-a-show following "So Random" in Sonny with a Chance. Chuck Barney of the Contra Costa Times said that the show's plots "play out in typical Disney Channel style with uncomplicated story lines, broad humor and moral uplift." In an interview, Bella Thorne said of the show, "It is about them going through the stuff that teens go through every day. The writing is very realistic. I have gone through most of these problems." Rosero McCoy, a choreographer for Camp Rock 2: The Final Jam was tapped to be a choreographer for the show, along with Claude Racine. The series follows Hannah Montana, Jonas, I'm in the Band and Phineas and Ferb as Disney's latest foray into music-oriented series.

=== Episode production ===
"Start It Up" was written by series creator and producer Chris Thompson and directed by Shelley Jensen. Sharon Swab and Rosario J. Roveto, Jr. are credited as assistant directors. All main cast members appear in the episode. Recurring cast members Caroline Sunshine, Anita Barone, and R. Brandon Johnson debut in their roles of Tinka Hessenheffer, Georgia Jones, and Gary Wilde, respectively. Matthew Scott Montgomery guest stars as A.D., as well as Charlie DePewa as Alex Scott. Duncan Tran and Luke Broadlick appear in bit roles as "Shake it Up Chicago" dancers. As the premiere episode of the series, "Start It Up" first aired on November 7, 2010, following an hour-long special of Hannah Montana Forever.

Four original songs recorded for the series are present in this episode. All of them are present in portions of the "Shake it Up Chicago" segments of the show. "Roll the Dice" was written by Niclas Molinder, Joacim Persson, Johan Alkenas, and Geraldo Sandell. Molinder, Persson and Alkenas also receive writing credits on "Our Generation," also written by Drew Ryan Scott. "Watch Me" was written and produced by Ben Charles, Aaron Harmon, and Jim Wes, also "All the Way Up".

== Reception ==
The series premiere of Shake It Up was watched by 6.2 million viewers, becoming Disney Channel's second highest-rated premiere in Disney Channel’s 27-year history, only behind the March 24, 2006 series premiere of Hannah Montana. The premiere scored an 11.0 rating (2.7 million viewers) among the 9- to 14-year-old demographic and a 10.6 rating/share (2.6 million viewers) among the 6- to 11-year-old demographic. It also became the highest-rated Sunday debut for a Disney Channel original series. Overall, it was the seventh most-watched program that aired on US cable television on November 7, 2010.

== Credits and personnel ==
Taken from the credits of "Start It Up."

- Bryan Hays – photography director
- Greg Richman – production designer
- Kris Trexler – editor
- Frank Pace – Unit production designer
- Rosario J. Roveto, Jr. – assistant director
- Sharon Swab – assistant director
- Howard Meltzer – casting
- Cheryl Foliart – music supervisor
- Rosero McCoy – choreography
- Claude Racine – assistant choreographer
- Peter Flisinger – associate choreography
- Jessica Replansky – costume director
- Paula Sutor – make-up department head
- Katherine Kremp – hair styling department head
- Daryn Reid-Gooddall – set decorator
- Jerry M. Armstrong – property director
- Frances Alet – script supervisor
- Christopher James Burke – production coordinator
- Dani Eslin – production controller
- Michael A. Joseph – technical director
- Thomas G. Tcimpdis – video control
- Ron Ybarra – video tape operator
- Jesse W. Peck – production sound mixer
- Charlie McDaniel – re-recording mixer
- John Bickelhaupt – re-recording mixer
- Gary Allen – camera operator
- Jack Chisolm – camera operator
- Larry Gaudette – camera operator
- Mark la Camera – camera operator
- Brian J. McKinnon – gaffer
- Bill Paden – key grip

- Taped at Los Angeles Center Studios
- Post-Production Sound by Warner Bros. Post Production Sound
- Digital Post-Production by Ascent Media
- Featured music written and produced by Niclas Molinder, Joacim Persson, Johan Alkenäs, Geraldo Sandell, Ben Charles, Aaron Harmon, Jim Wes, and Drew Ryan Scott
