= Shake It Up season 2 =

Shake It Up
- Season 2
- No. of episodes: 28

Release
- Original network: Disney Channel
- Original release: September 18, 2011 – August 17, 2012

Season chronology
- ← Previous; Season 1 Next → Season 3

The second season of Shake It Up aired on Disney Channel from September 18, 2011, to August 17, 2012. It consisted of 28 episodes, giving the series a total of 49 episodes. Caroline Sunshine was added to the main cast this season.

== Production and release ==
On March 16, 2011, the series was picked up for its second season. A few months later, it was announced that the series would begin with a one-hour special episode and that it would be aired later that fall. Production for the season filmed from July 2011 to March 2012. The second season officially premiered on September 18, 2011, but the one-hour special episode did not premiere as planned due to episodes being shown out of order. Disney Channel ordered the season to have 26 episodes, but it actually had 28 episodes. On August 17, 2012, the season concluded with a 90-minute special episode called "Made in Japan". Showrunner and executive producer Chris Thompson had left before the second season, so executive producer Rob Lotterstein took Thompson's place as showrunner and Jeff Strauss joined Lotterstein as executive producers. Eileen Conn remained in her role as co-executive producer, but became executive producer with Lotterstein and Strauss in the season finale. David Holden replaced John D. Beck, Ron Hart, Ron Zimmerman, and Howard J. Morris as consulting producer.

== Synopsis ==
CeCe and Rocky discover issues in their friendship. Throughout the season, they're usually arguing and things start to get out of hand on Shake It Up, Chicago. Other things include Rocky and CeCe trying to step up their game by getting even more famous beyond their gigs on the show. The show starts to fall apart all throughout the season. In the meantime, Flynn becomes more interested in outdoor activities, like biking (which he doesn't know how to do as mentioned in "Judge It Up") and camping activities. Ty tries to begin his rapping career, but things go awry when he fails to have "the proper rapping skills." Deuce gets a job at his uncle's restaurant "Crusty's" and develops relationship issues with Dina. Gunther and Tinka try to join in with the rest of the gang as they are usually bonding with the characters on certain events.

== Opening sequence ==
The opening theme starts with Rocky and CeCe dancing on the wing of an airplane (as shown in "Shake It Up, Up, and Away") doing a dance routine, then showing various clips of the cast members (some clips from season 1 are also included), starting off with Zendaya and Bella Thorne, then going in order with Davis Cleveland, Roshon Fegan, Adam Irigoyen, and Kenton Duty. Caroline Sunshine is now added to the opening credits with a few clips shown of her character. It then shows more various clips of the cast members as it gives credit to the creator of the series, Chris Thompson. A final clip shows Rocky and CeCe dancing next to the Shake It Up logo as in season one, but they are wearing different outfits. Selena Gomez sings the theme song.

== Music ==
The second soundtrack "Shake It Up: Live 2 Dance" was released on March 20, 2012. "Up, Up, and Away" was released as the first single from the album on February 14, 2012, and "Something to Dance For" (by Zendaya) and "TTYLXOX" (by Bella Thorne) were both released as the second and third singles on March 6, 2012, respectively. The mash-up video "Something to Dance For/TTYLXOX Mash-Up" was released on March 9, 2012, during an episode of Jessie. On August 21, 2012, the extended edition "Shake It Up: Made In Japan" was released with three new songs and a music video. "Fashion Is My Kryptonite" was released on July 20, 2012, as a promotional single with an accompanying music video, which was released on August 3, 2012. The soundtrack was the best-selling soundtrack of the year.

== Cast ==
- Bella Thorne as CeCe
- Zendaya as Rocky Blue
- Davis Cleveland as Flynn
- Roshon Fegan as Ty Blue
- Adam Irigoyen as Deuce Martinez
- Kenton Duty as Gunther
- Caroline Sunshine as Tinka

== Episodes ==
No. overall	No. in season	Title	Directed by	Written by	Original release date	Prod. code	US viewers (millions)
22	1	"Shrink It Up"	Joel Zwick	Rob Lotterstein	September 18, 2011	203	3.62
When Gary tells the girls that his therapist is offering a free appointment, CeCe signs herself and Rocky up for a few sessions in order to kiss up to Gary. Meanwhile, Flynn buys a toy dinosaur that doesn't work well. Also, Gunther and Tinka decide to try to be nice to someone and they pick Deuce. Guest stars: Harriet Sansom Harris as Dr. Pepper, R. Brandon Johnson as Gary Wilde, E.E. Bell as Mr. Block, Skylar Keesee as Young CeCe, Jasmyn Ramos as Young Rocky Song Featured: "Turn It On" by Amber Lily Notes: This episode was originally scheduled to air on September 25, 2011, but actually aired a week earlier on September 18, 2011. This is Caroline Sunshine's first appearance as a regular cast member. Due to episodes being shown out of order, events from "Shake It Up, Up & Away" are mentioned in this episode when Rocky is listing things that CeCe forced her to do, and Deuce got his job during "Shake It Up, Up & Away". In this episode, Rocky also mentions events from the episodes "Meatball It Up" and "Party It Up". A flashback shows how CeCe and Rocky met at dance class, and Gunther and Tinka are there.
23	2	"Three's a Crowd It Up"	Joel Zwick	Jenny Lee	September 25, 2011	206	2.94
A cute local dancer named Julio comes to perform on Shake It Up, Chicago!, and Rocky, CeCe, and Tinka all fall for him. Meanwhile, Henry becomes a substitute teacher in Flynn's class. Guest stars: Gabriel Morales as Julio, Buddy Handleson as Henry Dillon, Ainsley Bailey as Dina Garcia Song Featured: "Just Wanna Dance" by Geraldo Sandell and Ricky Luna Note: This is the third episode where Tinka appears without Gunther. Absent: Roshon Fegan as Ty Blue, Kenton Duty as Gunther Hessenheffer
24	3	"Shake It Up, Up & Away"	Joel Zwick	Rob Lotterstein (Part 1); Eileen Conn (Part 2)	October 2, 2011	201–202	3.81
Rocky and CeCe plan to go to Alabama with the rest of Shake It Up, Chicago dancers to help clean up a swamp; however, CeCe finds out about auditions for a new dance show called "Really, You Call That Dancing?" in Los Angeles and she tries convincing Rocky to ditch the benefit. Guest stars: Jim Pirri as Uncle Frank, R. Brandon Johnson as Gary Wilde, Anita Barone as Georgia Jones, Christopher Rich as the Mayor Songs Featured: "Up, Up, and Away" by Blush, "Bring the Fire" by Ylwa Notes: This episode was originally scheduled to air as the hour-long season premiere on September 18, 2011. Instead, the episode "Shrink It Up" aired in its place. This episode finally aired two weeks later on October 2, 2011. This is the first one-hour episode special for the series and the first episode title that does not end in "It Up". Due to episodes being shown out of order, events from this episode are mentioned in "Shrink It Up". In "Shrink It Up", Crusty's is their hangout but in this episode it has just opened up.
25	4	"Beam It Up"	Joel Zwick	David Holden	October 9, 2011	204	4.46
Rocky and CeCe go to a Halloween party at the Shake It Up, Chicago studio. Meanwhile, Flynn suspects that his new neighbor, Zane, is an alien and has a dream that he and Henry have been abducted. Guest stars: Instant Noodles from America's Best Dance Crew, Atticus Shaffer as Zane, Spencer Daniels as Paul, Buddy Handleson as Henry, Hudson Thames as D'Artagnan, Jodi Taffel as Brenda Song Featured: "Calling All the Monsters" by China Anne McClain (premiered in the A.N.T. Farm Halloween episode "mutANT farm") Absent: Roshon Fegan as Ty Blue, Adam Irigoyen as Deuce Martinez, Kenton Duty as Gunther Hessenheffer, Caroline Sunshine as Tinka Hessenheffer
26	5	"Doctor It Up"	Joel Zwick	Jeff Strauss	October 23, 2011	205	3.52
Rocky's dad, Dr. Curtis Blue, returns from his trip overseas and is unhappy to find out Rocky is dancing on Shake It Up, Chicago, and Ty wants to pursue a career as a rapper. CeCe and Rocky plan a surprise dance routine at the hospital to prove to Dr. Blue that Rocky is a great dancer and Ty is a great rapper. Guest stars: Phil Morris as Dr. Curtis Blue, Jim Pirri as Uncle Frank, Carla Renata as Marcie Blue Song Featured: "Dance For Life" by Adam Hicks and Drew Seeley, featuring a verse from Roshon Fegan (as Ty Blue) Absent: Kenton Duty as Gunther Hessenheffer, Caroline Sunshine as Tinka Hessenheffer
27	6	"Review It Up"	Joel Zwick	David Holden	November 6, 2011	210	3.94
When an entertainment blogger named Andy Burns gives Shake It Up, Chicago! a negative review, CeCe and Rocky went to his office and have to convince him that their dancing deserves praise but Andy Burns got injuries for CeCe and Rocky. Meanwhile, Deuce and Dina get bad advice on how to celebrate their one-year anniversary. Guest stars: Ben Savage as Andy Burns, Ainsley Bailey as Dina Garcia, Alex McKenna as Sarah, Noel Arthur as Guard Song Featured: "Critical" by TKO & Nevermind Absent: Davis Cleveland as Flynn Jones, Kenton Duty as Gunther Hessenheffer, Caroline Sunshine as Tinka Hessenheffer
28	7	"Double Pegasus It Up"	Joel Zwick	David Tolentino	November 13, 2011	207	3.24
CeCe finds out Deuce has been delivering pizza to her idol, Theodore Vainglorious, a choreographer who came up with an amazing dance move a few years back called the "Double Pegasus." When she and Rocky take over the pizza delivery in order to meet him, they find out he's living a less than glamorous life and he's given up on choreography. Guest stars: Leslie Jordan as Theodore, Jim Pirri as Uncle Frank, R. Brandon Johnson as Gary Wilde Song Featured: "Overtime" by Robyn Newman Absent: Roshon Fegan as Ty Blue, Kenton Duty as Gunther Hessenheffer, Caroline Sunshine as Tinka Hessenheffer
29	8	"Auction It Up"	Joel Zwick	David Tolentino	November 20, 2011	211	3.63
CeCe and Rocky set up a fundraiser through "Shake It Up, Chicago" to help save their former dance school, Ms. Nancy's Fancy Dance Academy. Meanwhile, Deuce and Ty enter a competition to win a new "Yo phone" after Deuce breaks Ty's phone. Guest stars: R. Brandon Johnson as Gary Wilde, Marissa Jaret Winokur as Ms. Nancy, Adam Trent as himself, Nicholas Braico as Klaus Hessenheffer Song Featured: "Moves Like Magic" by Adam Trent Note: Gunther and Tinka return after a long absence. Absent: Davis Cleveland as Flynn Jones
30	9	"Camp It Up"	Joel Zwick	Eileen Conn	November 27, 2011	213	3.89
In order to earn money for a week-long dance camp, Rocky and CeCe decide to host their own dance camp for little kids in CeCe's apartment. Flynn crushes on Suzy, a girl at the camp. The camp turns out to be successful and Larry Diller, a famous lawyer, begs Rocky and CeCe to join the camp, even though it's for children. Guest stars: Larry Miller as Larry Diller, Ashley Boettcher as Suzy, AK squared - winners of Make Your Mark "2011" Songs Featured: "Make Your Mark" by Drew Ryan Scott, "Bling Bling" by Windy Wagner, "Twist My Hips" by Tim James and Nevermind Absent: Adam Irigoyen as Deuce Martinez
31	10	"Jingle It Up"	Ellen Gittelsohn	Eileen Conn	December 11, 2011	212	3.48
It's the holidays and CeCe goes last-minute shopping for her mom, but she buys herself an expensive purse instead. Meanwhile, Rocky wants to make a young boy's Christmas wish come true by buying him the latest gift, the "GS Handheld Mega game 195", but they are all sold out. At Crusty's, Rocky finds Deuce, who has the gift, and threatens him for it. Also, Deuce invites Dina to go Christmas caroling with his family, only to find out she is a bad singer. Guest stars: Anita Barone as Officer Jones, Ainsley Bailey as Dina Garcia, Stuart Pankin as Santa, Heavy Impact Crew as Lakefield Mall dancers Song Featured: "Jingle Dub" Absent: Roshon Fegan as Ty Blue, Kenton Duty as Gunther Hessenheffer, Caroline Sunshine as Tinka Hessenheffer
32	11	"Apply It Up"	Joel Zwick	David Holden	January 8, 2012	215	3.18
CeCe applies herself and Rocky to audition for the prestigious CFA (Chicago Fine Arts Academy), but CeCe gets a packet qualifying her for a scholarship and Rocky gets a letter, which she thinks means that she was rejected. After Rocky tears the letter up in frustration, CeCe pieces it together and tells Rocky she also got into CFA. At Crusty's, Rocky's parents are proud that she was accepted, but they can't afford to send her to the school, leaving Rocky devastated. CeCe helps Rocky qualify for a scholarship by lying to the dean of CFA, claiming that Rocky's father is a single parent, but their lie is exposed when Rocky's mother shows up. Rocky and CeCe are grounded and their acceptance to CFA is retracted. Meanwhile, Flynn and Henry believe that an asteroid is headed towards Earth. Guest stars: Jonathan Slavin as Mark Tauzzig, Phil Morris as Dr. Curtis Blue, Carla Renata as Marcie Blue, Buddy Handleson as Henry Dillon Song Featured: "Something to Dance For" by Zendaya Absent: Roshon Fegan as Ty Blue, Adam Irigoyen as Deuce Martinez, Kenton Duty as Gunther Hessenheffer, Caroline Sunshine as Tinka Hessenheffer
33	12	"Split It Up"	Joel Zwick	Jenn Lloyd & Kevin Bonani	January 22, 2012	208	2.80
CeCe and Gunther are selected to be guest dancers on "Good Morning, Chicago", which makes CeCe feel uncomfortable that she wouldn't be dancing with Rocky. Rocky explains that there will be times when one of them will get something the other one doesn't and encourages her to perform. When CeCe and Gunther practice their dance routine, Rocky watches while Tinka teases Rocky about being jealous. After seeing how well their dance routine was, Gary informs CeCe and Gunther that they earned the Spotlight Dance of the week. Overhearing this, Tinka helps Rocky vent her jealousy and invites Rocky to join in her plan to get CeCe sick so she is not able to dance. However, Rocky turns it down. Later, Rocky admits she was jealous and helps CeCe with her hair for the performance. When the highlights in her hair turn green, CeCe accuses Rocky of purposefully doing it for revenge, when it was really Tinka who switched the highlight color. At "Good Morning, Chicago", Rocky delivers some balloons to CeCe and the two share a hug. Rocky helps CeCe with some last minute touches before she performs, and they are both locked in the dressing room by the Hessenheffers. Meanwhile, Deuce and Flynn help Ty improve his rap skills. They both try to give him a "bad boy" image, but he's a little too good at being bad. Back at "Good Morning, Chicago", right as the Hessenheffers are about to perform, the host interrupts their dance with breaking news, which takes up the rest of the time, so Gunther and Tinka never get to dance. Guest stars: R. Brandon Johnson as Gary Wilde, Kurt Long as Host, Gina St. John as Reporter, Mary Jo Catlett as Elderly Woman, and Beat Freaks as Featured Dancers Song Featured: "Edge Of The Mirror" by Emme Rose, "Bring the Fire" by Ylwa
34	13	"Copy Kat It Up"	Joel Zwick	Rob Lotterstein	February 19, 2012	219	3.46
When a fan named Kat meets Rocky and CeCe, she starts to copy CeCe’s appearance and secretly plots to take her place on "Shake It Up, Chicago!" CeCe and Rocky must find a way to show Kat’s true colors. Before they perform, Kat texts CeCe (pretending to be Rocky) telling her to go pick up her costume across town. When CeCe comes back, Kat and Rocky are performing and Kat wrecks the performance. To get payback, CeCe poses as a "Shake It Up, New York!" producer and over email, tells Kat that she is going to "Shake It Up, New York!" Meanwhile, Flynn acts as Ty's agent when dealing with a big time record producer. Ty figures out the producer wants him to rap for the younger generation, meaning songs about how to tie shoes. Ty quits and Flynn replaces him. When Flynn becomes internet sensation, Ty regrets quitting. Guest stars: Kerris Dorsey as Kat, the ICONic Boyz from America's Best Dance Crew, Jay Thomas as Dave Gold Songs Featured: "Bring the Fire" by Ylwa, "Critical" by TKO & Nevermind, "Edge of the Mirror" by Emme Rose, "Moves Like Magic" by Adam Trent, "Overtime" by Robyn Newman (Instrumental) Absent: Adam Irigoyen as Deuce Martinez, Kenton Duty as Gunther Hessenheffer, Caroline Sunshine as Tinka Hessenheffer
35	14	"Egg It Up"	Joel Zwick	Jenny Lee	February 26, 2012	209	2.63
When the girls' science teacher, Mr. Polk, pairs them up for a science project, Rocky is afraid partnering with CeCe will lower her grade. CeCe later finds out Rocky's working with someone else and is furious. Rocky tries to make it up to her by offering to do the whole project by herself and put CeCe's name on it, but CeCe would rather they do her project herself and is upset that Rocky underestimates her when it comes to school. The next day, Rocky still doesn't believe CeCe's project will work, but when both of their projects are tested, Rocky's doesn't work and CeCe's is successful. Rocky apologizes to CeCe and shows her that some discoveries happen by accident. Meanwhile, Flynn is mad at Ty for ignoring him at Crusty's, so he fires Ty as his babysitter and replaces him with Gunther. Gunther and Ty then compete to see who is the better babysitter. When they find out Flynn tricked them into doing his essay for him, they retaliate by writing his essay with false information. Guest star: Joel Brooks as Mr. Polk Songs Featured: "The Night Is Young" by Wild Thingz Note: This is the second episode where Gunther appears without Tinka. Absent: Adam Irigoyen as Deuce Martinez, Caroline Sunshine as Tinka Hessenheffer
36	15	"Judge It Up"	Ellen Gittelsohn	Eileen Conn	March 11, 2012	214	3.25
When Gunther and Tinka refuse to pay Rocky and CeCe their money for performing at Klaus's party, the girls take their case to "Teen Court". Gunther and Tinka claim Rocky and CeCe didn't perform well and they ruined Klaus's party. Gunther and Tinka also claim that they ate all the cake and yelled at Klaus. However, Rocky and CeCe think Gunther and Tinka ruined the party because they were so harsh to Klaus. Rocky and CeCe also claim that Tinka smashed the cake in Klaus's face. As soon as Judge Marsha is about to close the case, Deuce comes running in with a surveillance video from Crusty's. The video shows that all of them ruined Klaus's party, after smacking his birthday cake out of his hand by an accident. Later, Gunther and Tinka pay back the money to Rocky and CeCe as they promised, but with a slight catch: this time, they pay them back with pennies. Meanwhile, after finding out Flynn doesn't know how to ride a bike, Henry wants to teach him. Flynn is reluctant at first, but then, he sees how useful it is, and he wants to ride a bike. Flynn finds out that Henry tricked him into thinking that he rode the bike all along, but Henry actually rigged the bike so Flynn wouldn't fall off. Guest stars: Loretta Devine as Judge Marsha, Buddy Handleson as Henry Dillon, Nicholas Braico as Klaus Hessenheffer, William Ragsdale as Announcer Songs Featured: "TTYLXOX" by Bella Thorne, "We Right Here" by Drew Ryan Scott Absent: Roshon Fegan as Ty Blue
37	16	"Parent Trap It Up"	Joel Zwick	Jeff Strauss	March 25, 2012	218	2.97
When Rocky is convinced that CeCe's divorced dad is trying to woo CeCe's mom, she tries to plan their relationship relating to her book. CeCe doesn't believe it until she finds a ring in her dad's coat, leading both the girls to thinking he is going to propose to CeCe's mom. With the help of school librarian Miss Burke, they come up with a plan to go to the "Shake It Up, Chicago!" set and remake CeCe's parents' first date with a "Bollywood" theme. After the dance, it's revealed that CeCe's dad isn't planning to propose to her mom, but his girlfriend in Florida. Meanwhile, Ty and Deuce try to go on a double date at Crusty's, only to find out that Dina and Gina had a long-lasting rivalry since they were both little. Later, Ty and Deuce confront them by saying that they are always competing against each other and are annoyed they pulled their boyfriends into the "competition". Soon, Dina and Gina realize their mistakes and become friends. Special guest star: Tyra Banks as Miss Burke Guest stars: Teala Dunn as Gina, Ainsley Bailey as Dina Garcia, Anita Barone as Georgia Jones, Matthew Glave as J.J. Jones Song Featured: "Aaja Na" by Melinda S Absent: Kenton Duty as Gunther Hessenheffer, Caroline Sunshine as Tinka Hessenheffer
38	17	"Weird It Up"	Alfonso Ribeiro	David Tolentino	April 1, 2012	217	2.51
CeCe hires an agent to help the girls boost up their fame. The agent books them on an American adaptation of the Japanese game show Let's Get Weird, where the girls believe they have been booked to be background dancers on the set of the show. However, the parts the agent had actually booked them for was the roles of the "Weirdettes", two female models who are the subject of the consequences of a contestant's incorrect answers. To make matters worse, the contestant competing in the taping of the show they are booked for is none other than Flynn, who auditioned for the show after bribing the girls' agent (who tipped him off about the gig) in order to get back at CeCe for constantly neglecting him in favor of hanging out with Rocky. The game show turns out to be a lot more twisted than it seems, as the girls are forced to suffer comical, yet disgusting punishments for Flynn intentionally answering the questions incorrectly. However, after CeCe finally apologizes for not spending time with him, Flynn has a change of heart and attempts to answer the final question correctly to win the grand prize for all three of them. Unfortunately, Flynn's final answer is incorrect, and as a result the girls are forced to be humiliated by having soggy gunk puked on them by two people in bird costumes. Meanwhile, Ty likes Gloria, a foreign exchange student who only speaks Spanish. Due to the language diversities, Ty asks Deuce to accompany him on the date as a translator. In the end, the girls get back at their lousy agent by hiring one of the costumed birds from the show to puke on him. Guest stars: Denyse Tontz as Gloria, David Shatraw as Host, Jerry Sroka as Agent Absent: Kenton Duty as Gunther Hessenheffer, Caroline Sunshine as Tinka Hessenheffer
39	18	"Whodunit Up?"	Joel Zwick	Darin Henry	April 15, 2012	221	3.67
When a phantom threatens to shut down "Shake It Up Chicago," CeCe, Rocky, Gunther, and Tinka try to unmask the culprit. Meanwhile, Deuce helps Ty identify his secret admirer. Ty reluctantly agrees to meet her, but finds she isn't moving as earlier predicted. Guest stars: Steve Monroe as Ralph, Bridget Shergalis as Abigail Song Featured: "Whodunit" by Adam Hicks & Coco Jones Absent: Davis Cleveland as Flynn Jones
40	19	"Tunnel It Up"	Joel Zwick	Jenny Lee	May 13, 2012	216	3.28
Rocky, CeCe & Tinka try to be in two places at once as their spring formal arrives and Shake It Up, Chicago gets moved to a Saturday night prime-time time slot which means they will have to choose which one to go to....or will they. Meanwhile Dina is stressed out after she is put in charge of the school dance and the camera guy she hired for taking the pictures cancels, so Deuce hooks her up with his friend. Guest star: Ainsley Bailey as Dina Garcia. Song Featured: "A Space In The Stars" by Drew Seeley Note: This is the fourth episode where Tinka appears without Gunther. Absent: Roshon Fegan as Ty Blue, Kenton Duty as Gunther Hessenheffer
41	20	"Protest It Up"	Joel Zwick	Cat Davis	May 20, 2012	220	3.14
Rocky & CeCe try to overturn a school ruling that requires students to wear uniforms. Meanwhile, Gunther & Tinka take up new hobbies since they no longer have to be concerned about school clothes. Song Featured: "Show Ya How" by Adam Irigoyen & Kenton Duty Absent: Davis Cleveland as Flynn Jones
42	21	"Wrestle It Up"	Joel Zwick	Jenn Lloyd & Kevin Bonani	June 3, 2012	222	3.17
When some girls come down to Crusty's Pizza and gets attracted to Deuce, Ty tells him about the girl phenomenon. Deuce gets into a trance, which leads him to break up with Dina so he can flirt with other girls. Everyone then starts to ignore Deuce because he wasn't taken anymore, so he tries to apologize to Dina, whom already has a new boyfriend, Kevin. Meanwhile, CeCe’s mom gets a side job working as a security guard on a movie set and Rocky, CeCe, and Flynn devise a plan to sneak onto the set to see Taylor Lautner. Guest stars: Ainsley Bailey as Dina Garcia, Markus Silbiger as Kevin, James Kevin Ward as Robert Lautner, Kira Kosarin as Raina Kumar Song Featured: Critical by TKO & Nevermind Featured Dancers: I.aM.mE Absent: Kenton Duty as Gunther Hessenheffer, Caroline Sunshine as Tinka Hessenheffer
43	22	"Reality Check It Up"	Joel Zwick	Jenny Lee	June 10, 2012	226	2.87
CeCe and Rocky are hosting a special viewing party, when a reality TV show is doing a special on "Shake It Up, Chicago". Guest star: Alex Welch as Sheila Song Featured: "Total Access" of Nevermind, TKO and SOS, "Don't Push Me" of Coco Jones, "Moves Like Magic" of Adam Trent Absent: Adam Irigoyen as Deuce Martinez
44	23	"Rock and Roll It Up"	Roger Christiansen	Jenn Lloyd & Kevin Bonani	July 1, 2012	225	3.74
When Gary's grandma comes to SIU Chicago and she shares her old stories with the young dancers, who are fascinated when she explains that she was on one of the first teen dance shows. Guest star: Anita Gillette as Edie Wilde Songs Featured: Our Generation, Sixteen Girls, American Jukebox Theme Note: Roshon Fegan and Adam Irigoyen do not appear as Ty Blue and Deuce Martinez in this episode. However, Roshon Fegan and Adam Irigoyen appeared in this episode as totally different characters named Phoelix and Ace respectively in the flashback scenes that take place in 1953.
45	24	"Boot It Up"	Joel Zwick	Jeff Strauss	July 15, 2012	227	3.93
CeCe and Rocky are so excited to go to Major Dance Boot Camp for their summer vacation, but after they get there, they realize it's not exactly what they signed up for. Meanwhile, Flynn is bummed he can't go to summer camp because of a hurt arm, so Deuce and Dina find a way to bring camp to him. Guest stars: Suzi Barrett as Major Dance, Katelin Petersen as Kansas, Chloe Peterson as Jo, Ainsley Bailey as Dina Garcia Songs Featured: Where's the Party, School's Out Absent: Roshon Fegan as Ty Blue, Kenton Duty as Gunther Hessenheffer, Caroline Sunshine as Tinka Hessenheffer
46	25	"Slumber It Up"	Roger Christiansen	Jenny Lee	July 29, 2012	223	3.13
CeCe hosts a sleepover with Rocky, Tinka, and Dina. CeCe gives Dina a makeover. Meanwhile, Ty, Deuce, Gunther, and Flynn search for buried treasure, but end up overhearing the girl's sleep over. Song Featured: Where's the Party
47	26	"Surprise It Up"	Alfonso Ribeiro	David Holden & Jeff Strauss	August 5, 2012	224	2.87
CeCe tries to find out what Rocky has planned for her birthday but when Gunther asks her to go with him to his mailman Marvin's funeral, she thinks this is the surprise she has been waiting for. Meanwhile, the gang meets Deuce's identical cousin, Harrison, and Rocky falls for him. Song Featured: Surprise by TKO & Nevermind Note: This is the third episode where Gunther appears without Tinka. Adam Irigoyen portrays Harrison, a twin cousin of Deuce. Absent: Caroline Sunshine as Tinka Hessenheffer
48	27	"Embarrass It Up"	Joel Zwick	Eileen Conn	August 12, 2012	228	3.84
CeCe embarrasses herself on live TV by farting, and Rocky sneezes on TV and feels embarrassed as well. Flynn and Ty make fun of them after seeing their incidents happen. Song Featured: The Star I R by Caroline Sunshine Absent: Adam Irigoyen as Deuce Martinez, Kenton Duty as Gunther Hessenheffer, Caroline Sunshine as Tinka Hessenheffer
49	28	"Made in Japan"	Joel Zwick	Rob Lotterstein	August 17, 2012	229–231	4.54
In Japan, at Watanabe Studios, a worker suggests that they should make a video game with a group from Shake It Up. Back in the US, every state's show competes and Shake It Up, Chicago wins. They fly on a private jet to Japan, but CeCe takes Rocky to a hypnotist, Shelly, so Rocky can get over her fear of flying. While Rocky is still hypnotized, CeCe suggests that Shelly makes Rocky a fun and better person, which CeCe has to rub Rocky's shoulder and tell her to "get on board, Rocky," which helps CeCe take advantage of her. Rocky, CeCe, Gunther, Tinka, Ty, Flynn, Gary, Georgia are all aboard the plane and Henry goes as well, which he brings his android, Andy. Ty also keeps in contact with Deuce through his tablet, in which Deuce acts like he is actually in Japan. As everyone arrives in Tokyo, Gunther and Tinka lose their luggage but buy new clothes. The four dancers go to the studios to be put in the game, and Mr. Watanabe's grandchildren make an app for the game before its released because of Rocky's suggestion to disobey Mr. Watanabe's order to not make it. After he finds out, Rocky tries to talk to him, but she makes him feel like he's wrong and then he ends up cancelling the game. Gary makes Mr. Watanabe put the game project back on, but on the circumstance, Rocky and CeCe are fired from Shake It Up Chicago. Later, everyone is kicked out of the suite and has to find their way back home. Later, Rocky answers CeCe's phone when Shelly calls, finding that CeCe has been taking advantage of her and they end their friendship. Meanwhile, Tinka is being deported back to the old country after hitting a security guard accidentally, but Rocky and CeCe convince the security guards to send Gunther and Tinka back to the US together, which helps Rocky and CeCe reconcile and rekindle their friendship. Afterwards, the app that the Watanabe grandchildren uploaded contained a virus that could go global and stop all computers, but Henry, who did not upload the app, attempts to fix it, but can't get past the firewall. They infiltrate Watanabe Global and hack the mainframe, but gets caught by Mr. Watanabe, and Andy gets damaged in the ventilation shaft. In the ending, Rocky and CeCe try to get Mr. Watanabe to give them everything back and in the end, they perform "Made in Japan". At the very end, the ending credits come on with Deuce talking through the tablet, realizing that everyone left. Guest stars: Keone Young as Mr. Watanabe, R. Brandon Johnson as Gary Wilde, Anita Barone as Georgia Jones, Blue Man Group, Ally Maki as Keiko, Buddy Handleson as Henry Dillon Song Featured: Fashion Is My Kryptonite, Made In Japan, The Same Heart, Total Access, Don't Push Me, Show Ya How, Calling All the Monsters (performed by an extra), Shake It Up Notes: This episode was made as a 90-minute TV movie and this is the last appearance that Kenton Duty makes in the series. This is also the final episode Buddy Handleson plays Henry Dillon. Despite Handleson not being a main member in the series, he was a recurring character and marks his final appearance in this 90-minute season finale. Due to his departure from the show, Handleson was moved to Nickelodeon and played Wendell Bassett on Nickelodeon's short-lived sitcom Wendell & Vinnie which premiered in February 2013. Also, the boy who requested to mash-up the two songs in the opening scene of "Something to Dance For/TTYLXOX Mash-Up" appeared in Rocky and CeCe's performance of "The Same Heart."
