= 72 Hours (TV series) =

- Genre: Reality competition
- Presented by: Brandon Johnson
- Country of origin: United States
- Original language: English
- No. of seasons: 1
- No. of episodes: 8

Production
- Executive producers: Howard Schultz; Brady Connell; Rob LaPlante
- Running time: 42 minutes
- Production company: Lighthearted Entertainment

Original release
- Network: TNT
- Release: June 6 – July 26, 2013

72 Hours is an American television reality competition series produced by Lighthearted Entertainment that premiered on TNT on June 6, 2013. 72 Hours is hosted by actor and TV host Brandon Johnson who formerly co-starred as dance show host Gary Wilde on the Disney Channel original series Shake It Up. The series is executive produced by Howard Schultz, Brady Connell and Rob LaPlante. Jeff Spangler serves as the co-executive producer of the series.

In each episode of 72 Hours, three new competing teams of strangers are dropped in the complete wilderness where they are given very few essential items to survive. The teams must travel through harsh environments, such as dangerous wildlife or insect infestations for 72 hours to find a hidden briefcase that contains $100,000. The team that finds the briefcase is the winner of the competition and they receive the $100,000 cash prize.

== Premise ==
Each episode in the series introduces new groups of strangers who are dropped off in a remote location. Each episode has a different location. For example, one episode takes place in the American Southwest and another episode takes place in the island of Hawaii. Once the teams are dropped at a location, they are supplied with only a single bottle of water and a GPS tracking device. The goal of the competition is to survive and travel through harsh and dangerous environments, such as dangerous wildlife or insect infestations to find a hidden briefcase containing $100,000. The team that finds the briefcase is the winner of the competition and they receive the $100,000 cash prize.

== Episodes ==
No.	Title	Original release date	Prod. code	US viewers (millions)
1	"Yasawa Islands, Fiji"	June 6, 2013	101	0.82
Three teams of strangers are dropped off in the Yasawa Islands of Fiji where they must survive through the island's sizzling heat and overpowering waters to find the hidden briefcase.
2	"Lost Coast of New Zealand"	June 13, 2013	102	0.71
Three teams of strangers are taken to New Zealand where they must survive through thick forests, dangerous cliffs and large sand dunes to find the hidden briefcase.
3	"Lana'i Hawaii"	June 21, 2013	103	0.46
Three teams of strangers are dropped off in the Hawaiian island of Lana'i where they must navigate through deserted beaches and steep canyons to find the hidden briefcase.
4	"Flinder's Island, Tasmania"	June 28, 2013	104	0.78
Three teams of strangers are taken to Flinders Island in Australia where they must survive through rough beaches, hazardous mountains and dangerous lagoons to find the hidden briefcase.
5	"American Southwest"	July 5, 2013	105	0.46
Three teams of strangers are taken to a desert in the U.S. state of New Mexico where they must survive through scorching temperatures and steep canyons to find the hidden briefcase.
6	"New Zealand Alps"	July 12, 2013	106	0.47
Three teams of strangers are dropped off in the southern alps of New Zealand where they must cross through snow-covered mountains and endure freezing temperatures to find the hidden briefcase.
7	"Fijian Jungle"	July 19, 2013	107	0.69
Three teams of strangers are dropped off in the jungles of Fiji where they must survive through steep mountain peaks and dense rain forests to find the hidden briefcase.
8	"The Rockies"	July 26, 2013	108	0.71
Three teams of strangers are dropped off in the Rocky Mountains where they must cross through gigantic mountain peaks and endure volatile weather conditions to find the hidden briefcase.

== Reception ==
72 Hours has received mixed reviews from critics. The series currently has a score of 48 out of 100 on Metacritic, citing mixed or average reviews. Entertainment Weekly critic Adam Carlson stated "Like other snackable television like this, 72 Hours isn't afraid of delivering everything you want, including not just a few reality competition tropes — but all of them."

The show was awarded 3 stars by Common Sense Media reviewer Melissa Camacho. Melissa praised that "the show's primary focus on the actual race, rather than personal drama, makes it a fun viewing choice."
