= Alone for Christmas =

- Directed by: Joseph J. Lawson
- Written by: Nancy Leopardi
- Story by: Naomi L. Selfman
- Produced by: David Michael Latt; David Rimawi; Paul Bales
- Starring: David DeLuise; Kim Little; Davis Cleveland
- Cinematography: Ben Demaree
- Edited by: Rob Pallatina
- Music by: Chris Ridenhour
- Production company: The Asylum
- Release date: October 15, 2013
- Running time: 97 minutes
- Country: United States
- Language: English

Alone for Christmas (also known as Bone Alone) is a 2013 comedy film created by the independent film group The Asylum. A "loose mockbuster" of hit film series Home Alone, the film is directed by Joseph J. Lawson, written by Nancy Leopardi. It stars David DeLuise, Kim Little and Davis Cleveland.

== Premise ==
When a family visits Grandma's house on Christmas Eve, they leave their dog at home alone. When three thieves try to take the presents from under the Christmas tree, the dog must use every trick it knows to stop them.

== Cast ==
- David DeLuise as Dad
- Kim Little as Mom
- Davis Cleveland as Dillon Mateo Rojas
- Gerald Webb as Columbus (voice)
- Natalie Jane as KC
- Kevin Sorbo as Quentin
- Jeremy Mascia as Jake Marcos Olea
- Jonathan Nation as Anthony Leandro Cejas
- Justin Hoffmeister as Rob Ricky Ricon (23)
- Hooligan as Bone the Dog
- Bill Pomeroy as Bone (voice) (as William R. Pomeroy)
- John Kenward as Phil
- Torpedo as Columbus the Dog
- Kevin Yarbrough as Cupcake (voice)
- Hitchcock as Cupcake the Dog

== Release ==
The film was released on October 15, 2013.

== Reception ==
CineMagazine rated the film 1 star.
