= Caroline Sunshine =

American political aide and former actress (born 1995)

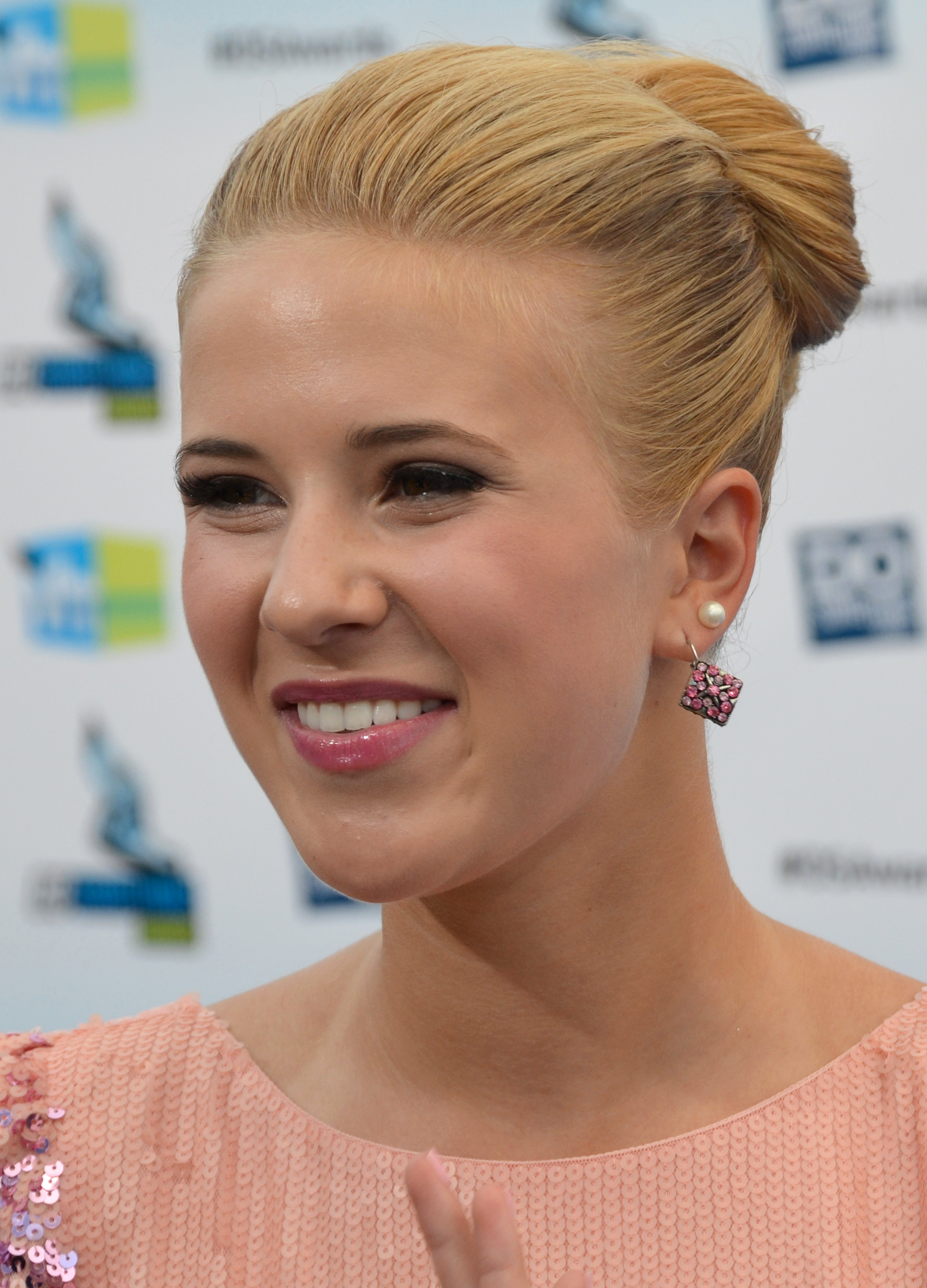
- Sunshine in 2012
- Born: Caroline Mohr Sunshine; September 5, 1995 (age 31); Atlanta, Georgia, U.S.
- Education: Claremont McKenna College
- Occupations: Political aide; actress; television commentator
- Years active: 2004–present (Note: Sunshine began her political career presently starting in 2018 while her time as an actress was from 2004 to 2017.)
- Political party: Republican

Caroline Mohr Sunshine (born September 5, 1995) is an American political aide and former actress, who previously worked as a White House staffer during the presidency of Donald Trump in 2018. As an actress, she is best known for her co-starring role as flashy, rude European exchange student Tinka Hessenheffer on the Disney Channel series Shake It Up. Sunshine has also appeared in the feature film Marmaduke (2010) and the direct-to-video film The Outfield (2015). Since 2026, she has become a frequent panelist on CNN's NewsNight with Abby Phillip.

== Early life ==
Sunshine was born Caroline Mohr Sunshine on September 5, 1995, in Atlanta, Georgia, to parents Thom and Karen (née Mohr) Sunshine. She was raised in Orange County, California, and has two younger brothers, Johnny and Christopher. Sunshine began studying ballet at the age of 3 and landed her first lead role playing Goldilocks in a kindergarten play. She later moved on to acting with the Orange County Children's Theater and dancing competitively with the South Coast Performing Arts studio in Tustin, California.

== Career ==
=== Acting ===
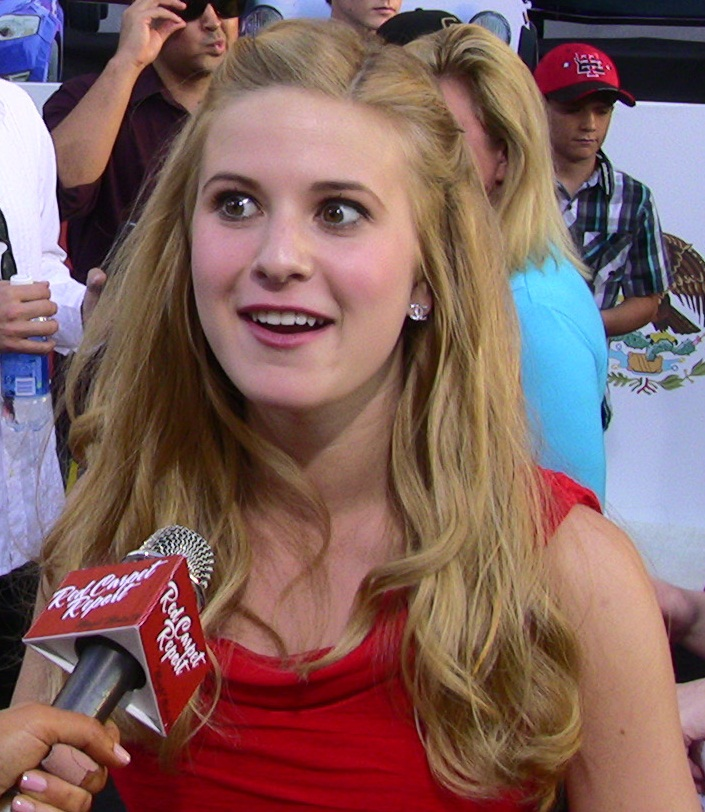
Sunshine at the world premiere of Cars 2 in June 2011

In 2004 Sunshine started in theater and her stage credits include Annie Warbucks at the Orange County Children's Theatre, The Nutcracker at the Academy of Dance and South Coast Performing Arts, and Stage Door at the Lutheran High School of Orange County. In 2006, Sunshine began going to professional auditions at the age of 11, and landed her first role in a commercial for Amazing Allysen the talking doll, as well as commercial work for Yoplait Go-Gurt, and Cap'n Crunch. In 2010, Sunshine filmed her first pilot for the CBS sitcom, Team Spitz, co-starring as the teenage daughter of a high school coach played by Rob Riggle. In the summer of that same year, she gained popular notoriety for her role as Barbara Winslow in her first feature film, Marmaduke, based on the comic strip of the same name.

In the fall of 2010, Sunshine landed what would become her most famous role as a co-star on the Disney Channel original series, Shake It Up as European exchange student, Tinka Hessenheffer alongside Kenton Duty as her flamboyant twin brother, Gunther Hessenheffer. The glitzy brother/sister duo of Gunther and Tinka is said to be inspired by Ryan and Sharpay Evans of Disney's High School Musical franchise. She was a recurring cast member during the first season, but was promoted to a regular character for the second and third seasons. The series ended in November 2013. Sunshine appeared on the Disney Channel Christmas album Holidays Unwrapped; her cover version of "All I Want for Christmas Is You" was featured as the tenth song on the album.

In June 2014, she filmed a Freeform pilot called Recovery Road based on Blake Nelson's novel of the same name, in which she co-starred alongside Samantha Logan. Neither Sunshine nor Logan would appear in the actual series, however. Logan was replaced by Jessica Sula and Sunshine's character was removed from the script. During 2015, Sunshine appeared in the television film Go Four Broke as Tiffani Brand. Earlier that year, she appeared in the big screen production of The Outfield. In 2017, Sunshine appeared in the Lifetime television film Mommy I Didn't Do It as Sylvie Garrett before retiring from the entertainment industry the following year.

=== Activism ===
In February 2011, Sunshine became the spokesmodel for the teen fragrance "Puppy Love 4 Girlz". "Puppy Love" Fragrances is committed to helping homeless dogs and puppies, with a portion of all proceeds of the perfume going to local animal shelters. In May 2011, Sunshine was named one of Dream Magazine's "Top 16 Under 16".

In addition to her work with "Puppy Love", Sunshine is involved in several other charitable causes including the "Joyful Sewing Organization," which makes blankets for cancer patients, "Working Wardrobes," which provides assistance to underprivileged women and victims of domestic abuse, the Orange County Child Abuse Prevention Center, which offers in-home parenting classes to families to break the generational cycle of abuse, the "Adopt A Hero" program, which provides for the needs of soldiers and their families; the "Loaves and Fishes Ministry" which helps to feed the homeless, and the "Thirst Project," which is dedicated to providing clean drinking water to communities in developing nations.

=== Politics ===
Sunshine became involved in politics as a White House intern during the Trump Administration in January 2018, receiving a full-time job as a press assistant by mid-March 2018. Prior to this role, Sunshine had interned for the office of Kevin McCarthy, then the House Majority Leader; the College Republican National Committee; and the California Republican Party. In February 2023, Sunshine became the press secretary and communications director for Eric Doden, a gubernatorial candidate for Indiana governor. In December 2023, Sunshine was hired as the press secretary for Vivek Ramaswamy's 2024 presidential campaign. In June 2024, Sunshine was re-hired by Donald Trump, as the Deputy Communications Director of his 2024 presidential campaign.

=== Media commentary ===
Following the 2024 campaign, Sunshine has appeared as a panelist on CNN's NewsNight with Abby Phillip, where she has discussed topics including the 2020 election and U.S.-Iran policy. She has also made appearances on Fox News programs, including Fox Across America with Jimmy Failla.

=== Personal life ===
Sunshine is a graduate of Claremont McKenna College in Claremont, California, and Orange Lutheran High School in Orange, California.

== Filmography ==
Film roles
Year	Title	Role
2010	Marmaduke	Barbara Winslow
2015	The Outfield	Emily Jordan

Television roles
Year	Title	Role	Notes
2008	What's the Word?	Herself	Episode: "Johnny Kapahala: Back on Board"
2010–2013	Shake It Up	Tinka Hessenheffer	Recurring role (season 1); main role (seasons 2–3); 45 episodes
2012	A.N.T. Farm	Ella	Episode: "Some enchANTed evening"
2014	Fish Hooks	Alexis	Voice; episode "Algae Day/Bea Saves a Tree"
2017	Mommy I Didn't Do It	Sylvie Garrett	Television film

== Stage ==
Year	Title	Role
2006	Annie Warbucks	Orphan
2005	The Nutcracker	Doll
2006	Stage Door	Annie

== Discography ==
=== Promotional singles ===
Year	Song	Album
2012	"Roam" (with Davis Cleveland, Kenton Duty and Adam Irigoyen)	Treasure Buddies

=== Other appearances ===
Year	Title	Album
2012	"The Star I R"	Shake It Up: Live 2 Dance
2012	"All I Want For Christmas Is You"	Disney Channel Holiday Playlist
2013	"Afterparty" (with Roshon Fegan)	Shake It Up: I <3 Dance

== Awards and nominations ==
Year	Award	Category	Work	Result	Ref.
2011	Young Artist Awards	Outstanding Young Ensemble in a TV Series (shared with Bella Thorne, Zendaya, Davis Cleveland, Roshon Fegan, Adam Irigoyen and Kenton Duty)	Shake It Up	Nominated	
2012	Young Artist Awards	Outstanding Young Ensemble in a TV Series (shared with Bella Thorne, Zendaya, Davis Cleveland, Roshon Fegan, Adam Irigoyen and Kenton Duty)	Shake It Up	Nominated	
