= Kenton Duty =

American actor, singer, and dancer (born 1995)

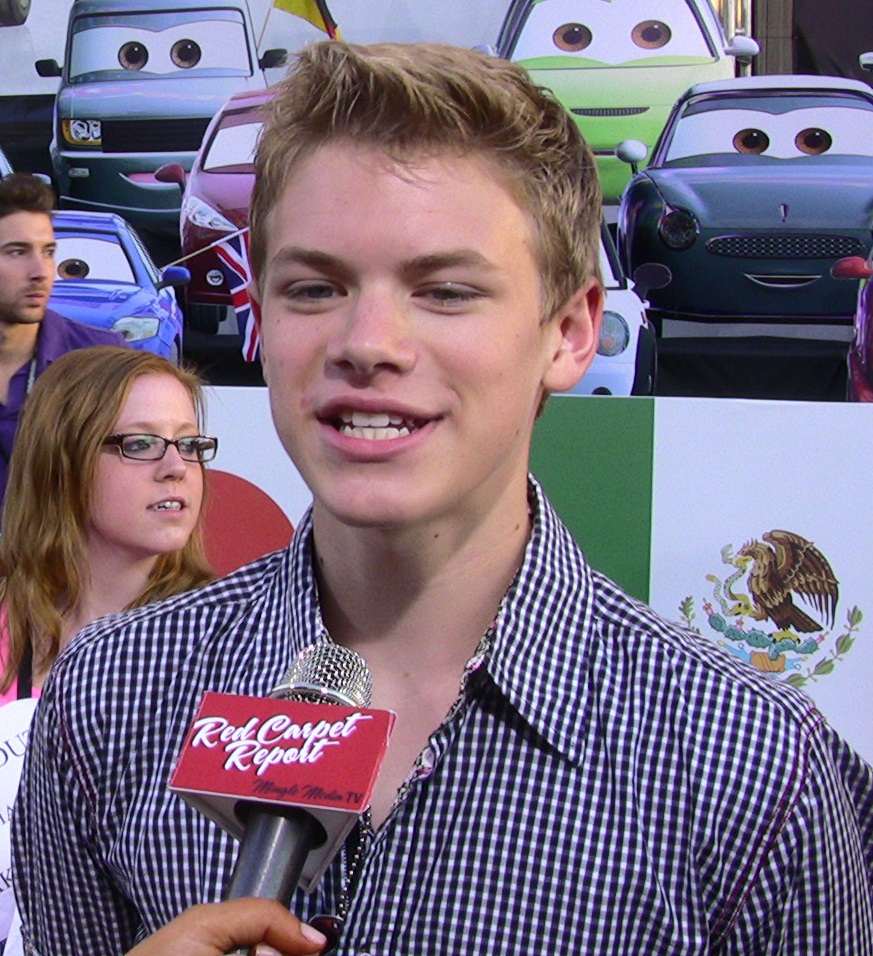
- Duty in 2011
- Born: Jeffrey Kenton Duty; May 12, 1995 (age 31); Plano, Texas, U.S.
- Occupations: Actor; singer; dancer
- Years active: 2004–present
- Height: 6 ft 4 in (193 cm)
- Spouse: Mosley Agin (m. 2019)

Jeffrey Kenton Duty (born May 12, 1995) is an American actor, singer, and dancer. He is best known for his recurring role as "young Jacob" on the final season of the ABC primetime drama, Lost, and for his co-starring role as the flamboyant European exchange student, Gunther Hessenheffer on the Disney Channel comedy series, Shake It Up, and Matt Prylek in the anti-bullying movie, Contest.

== Early life ==
Duty was born Jeffrey Kenton Duty on May 12, 1995, to Deborah (née Quinlan) and Jeffrey Duty, and raised in Plano, Texas. He has two younger siblings, twin sisters, Jessica and Rebecca, born in 1999. Duty first began studying acting at the age of 9, when his parents suggested he attend a musical theatre workshop to help him feel comfortable in front of an audience for school presentations. It was at the summer workshop that he discovered he had a love for musical theatre, and it was there that he would also meet the casting director who would ask him to audition for his first play, A Christmas Carol.

== Career ==
In 2004, Duty began his acting career in Dallas, Texas, at the age of 9, playing "Young Scrooge" in the Dallas Theater Center's musical stage production of A Christmas Carol. He appeared on-stage again the following year with a principal role in the Denton Community Theatre production of Ragtime. Duty began auditioning for roles in Los Angeles after he was discovered at a showcase performance at the Young Actors Studio in Dallas, Texas by Hollywood talent agent, Cindy Osbrink and she invited him to come to California to audition for pilot season. He has appeared in numerous national commercials for McDonald's, Wal-Mart, Pizza Hut, and Mattel.

In 2007, after several appearances in comedy sketches on The Tonight Show with Jay Leno, Duty landed his first featured role as Michael in the Lifetime television movie, Christmas in Paradise. Over the next two years, he appeared in guest-starring roles on Cold Case and The Jay Leno Show, as well as a co-starring role in the popular web series Ctrl.

In 2009, Duty landed his first feature film role in the suspense thriller, 2:13, as well as feature film roles in the horror film, Forget Me Not, the comedy film, Crazy on the Outside. In February 2010, he played a supporting role in the film, My Name Is Khan directed by Karan Johar and starring superstar Shah Rukh Khan and Kajol. In the spring of 2010, Duty gained popular notoriety in the role of "Young Jacob" on the hit TV series Lost, although no one, including Duty himself, knew who his character was until nearly the final episode of the series. He was billed simply as "Teenage Boy".

In the fall of 2010, Duty landed a co-starring role on the Disney Channel original series Shake It Up! as the flamboyant dancer/fashion designer, Gunther Hessenheffer alongside Caroline Sunshine as his twin sister, Tinka. The glitzy brother/sister duo of Gunther and Tinka is said to be inspired by Ryan and Sharpay Evans of Disney's High School Musical franchise. While finding some aspects of the show formulaic, People Magazine critic, Tom Gliatto expressed appreciation for the comedic twosome's work on the series, writing: "Shake It Up doesn't shake up the kidcom formula, but it has something more than the usual shiny-sparkly cuteness... The best performances are from Caroline Sunshine and Kenton Duty as an overbearing brother-and-sister act from abroad named Tinka and Gunther. They're like High School Musical's Sharpay split in two and speaking in an unplaceable accent."

On June 4, 2012, it was announced that Duty would no longer be a regular on Shake It Up, but would possibly return in a recurring capacity much like co-star Caroline Sunshine during the first season, though, he did not return at all. Not long after his departure from Shake It Up, Duty began work on the films Contest, Silver Bells and the short, Murphy.

After a brief stint in the musical group Invasion, Duty moved on to developing his solo music career. In May 2013, he released the lyric video for his first single, titled "Teenage Summer Nights".

== Personal life ==
In 2010, Duty lived in Los Angeles with his parents and two younger twin sisters. Duty loves animals and dreamed of becoming a veterinarian before beginning his acting career. He has had a pet guinea pig named Peanut, and has a horse named Prince that he keeps on his grandmother's property in Texas. Duty's hobbies include baking, cooking, spending time with his friends, and horseback riding. He also enjoys singing, playing guitar and songwriting. Before beginning work on the TV series Shake It Up!, Duty played guitar and sang in the band KGMC Gigmasters with Braeden Lemasters and Lost co-star Dylan Minnette. Having no dance experience prior to his role on Shake It Up, Duty began taking private lessons in his free time to develop his dance skills.

When he isn't working, Duty involves himself with charitable causes including the Disney's Friends for Change initiative, which benefits environmental charities through the Disney Worldwide Conservation Fund, the Starlight Children's Foundation, which is dedicated to improving the quality of life for children with chronic and life-threatening medical conditions, UCLA Mattel Children's Hospital, which is dedicated to researching and treating pediatric diseases, the Cystic Fibrosis Foundation, which is dedicated to improving the quality of life for those living with cystic fibrosis, and St. Jude Children's Hospital, which is dedicated to providing treatment to children with cancer and other catastrophic illnesses. He is also involved with the Food Allergy and Anaphylaxis Network (FAAN). FAAN is a non-profit organization that provides information, programs and resources about food allergies and anaphylaxis.

In addition to his charity work, Duty has been an outspoken voice against school bullying. In May 2011, he was named one of Dream Magazine's "Top 16 Under 16" and, when asked about the problem of bullying and cyber-bullying, Duty told the magazine - "You know, I have been bullied. It is always an awkward and difficult situation to be in. A couple of things to try when being bullied is to avoid the bully as much as possible, try using humor against the bully, have a sense of confidence... Hold your head up and look everyone in the eyes."

On July 1, 2019, he married his long time girlfriend, director and filmmaker Mosley Agin. In September 2023, his wife revealed that they had a private wedding ceremony on September 28, 2019, over two months after they legally married.

== Filmography ==
=== Film ===
Year	Title	Role	Notes
2009	2:13	Young Russell	
2009	Forget Me Not	Young Chad	
2010	Crazy on the Outside	Ethan Papadopolous	
2010	My Name Is Khan	Reese Garrick	Indian film
2012	Amazing Love: The Story of Hosea	Steve	
2012	Zendaya: Behind the Scenes	Himself	Documentary
2013	Contest	Matt Prylek	
2013	Silver Bells	Jason Dalt	
2014	One Direction: Clevver's Ultimate Fan Guide	Himself	
2014	The Adventures of Mickey Matson and the Pirate's Code	Max	
2015	Crowning Jules	Kevin	
2016	Little Savages	Todd	
2016	A Housekeeper's Revenge	Matthew	
2017	Crowning Jules	Kevin	
TBA	The Nameless	Gold Mask	
TBA	A Life Connected	Morgan Woodruff	

=== Television ===
Year	Title	Role	Notes
2006–2007	The Tonight Show with Jay Leno	Various roles	4 episodes
2007	Christmas in Paradise	Michael Marino	Television movie
2008	3-Minute Game Show	Himself - Contestant	1 episode
2008	Cold Case	Chuck Pierce in 1969	1 episode
2009	Ctrl	Young Ben	Web series; recurring role; 10 episodes
2009	The Jay Leno Show	Various roles	2 episodes
2010	Lost	Teenage Boy (Young Jacob)	4 episodes
2010	Jimmy Kimmel Live!	Young Jacob	1 episode
2011	Last Man Standing	Victor Blake	1 episode
2010–2012	Shake It Up!	Gunther Hessenheffer	Main role (seasons 1–2); 26 episodes
2015	Fresh Off the Boat	Kevin	1 episode
2015	Astrid Clover	Chambray	1 episode
2015	Filthy Preppy Teens	Jorgen	1 episode
2016	The Encounter		1 episode
2017–2018	Hilton Head Island	Derek Trisk	Recurring role
2019	Aware I'm Rare	Christian	1 episode

== Discography ==
Year	Single	Album
2011	"Monster Mash" (With Adam Irigoyen and Davis Cleveland)	Spooky Buddies Soundtrack
2012	"Roam" (With Caroline Sunshine, Adam Irigoyen and Davis Cleveland)	Treasure Buddies Soundtrack
2012	"Show Ya How" (With Adam Irigoyen)	Shake It Up: Live 2 Dance
2013	"Teenage Summer Nights"	
2013	"Breaking the Surface"	Contest
2014	"Dare To Love" (With Mandy Rain)	Riot

== Awards and nominations ==
Year	Award	Category	Nominated work	Result	Ref.
2011	Young Artist Awards	Outstanding Young Ensemble in a TV Series (shared with Bella Thorne, Zendaya, Davis Cleveland, Roshon Fegan, Adam Irigoyen and Caroline Sunshine)	Shake It Up	Nominated	
2012	Young Artist Awards	Outstanding Young Ensemble in a TV Series (shared with Bella Thorne, Zendaya, Davis Cleveland, Roshon Fegan, Adam Irigoyen and Caroline Sunshine)	Shake It Up	Nominated	
