= Eileen Conn =

American television producer and television writer

- Occupations: Television producer, television writer
- Years active: Since 1987
- Spouse: Larry Miller (m. 1993)
- Children: 2

Eileen Conn is an American television producer and television writer.

== Biography ==
Her credits include Get a Life, Mad About You, Dream On, NewsRadio, Just Shoot Me!, DAG (also co-creator), Courting Alex and serving as executive producer for Shake It Up (in which her husband has appeared) alongside Rob Lotterstein and Made in Japan.

== Personal life ==
In 1993, Conn married actor-comedian Larry Miller, with whom she has two children.
