= Anita Barone =

American actress (born 1964)

- Born: Anita L. Barone; September 25, 1964 (age 61); St. Louis, Missouri, U.S.
- Education: University of Detroit Mercy (BFA); Wayne State University (MFA)
- Occupation: Actress
- Years active: 1987–present
- Spouse: Matthew Glave (m. 2000)
- Children: 2

Anita L. Barone (born September 25, 1964) is an American actress. She is known for her appearances in sitcoms The Jeff Foxworthy Show, Daddio, Shake It Up, The War at Home and Friends.

== Life and career ==
Barone was born September 25, 1964, in St. Louis, Missouri. She earned her BFA from the University of Detroit in 1986, followed by an MFA, theatre, from Wayne State University, where she was taught by director/professor Robert T. Hazzard.

Barone appeared in the fourth-season Seinfeld episode "The Shoes" as Gail Cunningham, a chef who admires Elaine Benes' shoes. In the early 1990s, she was a regular cast member of Carol & Company with actress Carol Burnett. Barone also played Carol Willick, Ross Geller's ex-wife, in the character's first appearance in Friends. She left the show as she wanted to pursue a more full-time role and was replaced by Jane Sibbett. She starred on The Jeff Foxworthy Show for the first season (1995–1996) and in The War at Home from 2005 to 2007. In 2000, Barone also co-starred in the sitcom Daddio.

Barone's other television credits include Curb Your Enthusiasm, Quantum Leap, Empty Nest, Chicago Hope, Castle, Do Not Disturb, Ally McBeal, Caroline in the City, Party of Five and The Larry Sanders Show.

In 2004, she was the recipient of the 2005 Methodfest Best Supporting Actress Award for her work in feature film, One Last Ride.

In 2010, three years after The War at Home ended its run, Barone began her recurring role in the Disney Channel sitcom Shake It Up as Officer Georgia Jones, the mother of Bella Thorne's character CeCe Jones. Barone's husband, actor Matthew Glave, guest starred in two episodes of Shake It Up as J.J. Jones, the ex-husband of Barone's character.

== Personal life ==
Barone is married to actor Matthew Glave, with whom she has two daughters, Madeline and Roxanne. She currently lives in Los Angeles with her family.

== Filmography ==
=== Films ===
Year	Title	Role	Notes
1987	The Rosary Murders	Irene Jimenez	
1991	Ricochet	Waitress	
1995	Wounded Heart	Franny	TV film
1996	Just Friends	Rebecca	
1997	Dream with the Fishes	Mary	
1997	Running Time	Janie	
1997	Just Write	Carrie	
1997	Critics and Other Freaks	Waitress	
1998	Grown-Ups	Kim	TV film
1999	The Sex Monster	Carol	
2001	Bev	Bev	TV film
2003	Buttleman	Wendy Blitzer	
2003	These Guys	Gillian	TV film
2004	One Last Ride	Gina	
2004	Paradise	Sammi	TV film

=== Television ===
Year	Title	Role	Notes
1990–1991	Carol & Company	Various	Series regular
1991	Dear John USA	Connie	Episode: "Lust and Death"
1993	Quantum Leap	Debbie Schaefer	Episode: "Dr. Ruth"
1993	Seinfeld	Gail Cunningham	Episode: "The Shoes"
1993	Empty Nest	Cara	Episode: "My Dad, My Doctor"
1993	The Larry Sanders Show	Michelle	Episode: "Larry Loses Interest"
1993	The Second Half	Mia	Episode: "Prelude to a Job"
1994	Friends	Carol Willick	Episode: "The One with the Sonogram at the End"
1995	Pointman	P.J.	Episode: "Father Connie"
1995–1996	The Jeff Foxworthy Show	Karen Foxworthy	Series regular
1996	Public Morals	Ashley	Episode: "The Green Cover"
1996–1997	Party of Five	Franny Steiner	2 episodes
1997	Caroline in the City	Jeannie Hilton	Episode: "Caroline and the Egg"
1997	Life... and Stuff	Jordan Emery	3 episodes
1998	Chicago Hope	Leslie Stark	Episode: "Broken Hearts"
1998	Beyond Belief: Fact or Fiction	Laura	2 episodes
2000	Daddio	Linda Woods	Series regular
2001	Ally McBeal	Sarah Werner	Episode: "Fear of Flirting"
2005–2007	The War at Home	Vicky Gold	Series lead
2008	Do Not Disturb	Mindy	Episode: "Dosing"
2009	Castle	Janice Freeman	Episode: "Vampire Weekend"
2009	Curb Your Enthusiasm	Denise	Episode: "Denise Handicapped"
2010–2013	Shake It Up	Georgia Jones	Series regular
2011	Desperate Housewives	Doreen Vance	Episode: "Come on Over for Dinner"
2013	The Exes	Julia	Episode: "Trading Places"
2014	Hot in Cleveland	Lisa	Episode: "The Italian Job"
2014	Parenthood	Mrs. Jones	Episode: "Lean In"
2016	The Real O'Neals	Suzie	Episode: "The Real Book Club"
2017	Still the King	Walt's Mom	Episode: "Flatbushes"
2018	K.C. Undercover	Lucy Clark	Episode: "K.C. Times Three"
2019, 2023	A Million Little Things	Sophie	2 episodes: "Goodbye" and "One Big Thing"
2020	Brews Brothers	Sabrina	2 episodes
