= Adam Irigoyen =

American actor, singer, rapper and dancer

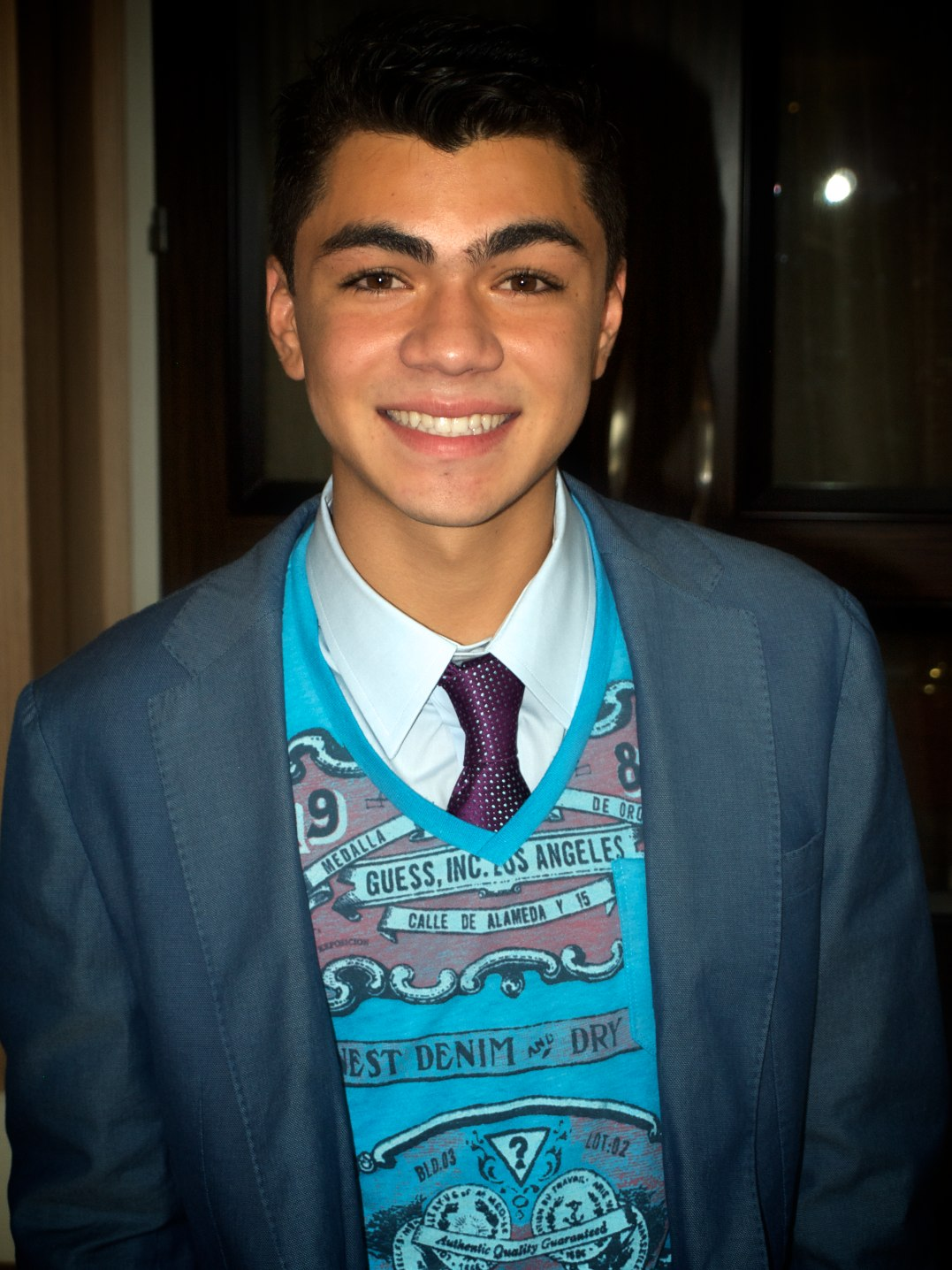
- Irigoyen at the 2012 Imagen Foundation Awards.
- Born: August 5, 1997 (age 28); Miami, Florida, U.S.
- Occupations: Actor; singer; rapper; dancer
- Years active: 2009–present
- Musical career
- Genres: Pop; Latin pop
- Website: adamirigoyen.com

Adam Irigoyen (born August 5, 1997) is an American actor, singer, rapper and dancer. He is best known for his role as Deuce Martinez in the Disney Channel series Shake It Up.

== Early life ==
Adam Irigoyen was born August 5, 1997, in Miami, Florida to Cuban parents. He attended Christina M. Eve Elementary and has revisited his old schools to talk to students. He currently lives in Southern California with his mother Annie, who is a teacher, his father Eric, who is also an educator, his younger brother Jake (b. January 21, 2004) and his older sister Kimberly (b. March 10). Irigoyen likes dancing and enjoys playing sports, particularly basketball.

== Career ==
Irigoyen started his acting career when he was 11 years old. He appeared in commercials and print advertisements before taking a guest-starring role in the Disney Channel sitcom Wizards of Waverly Place. It was his first guest star role ever and he was "super grateful because at the time" that was his "favorite show."

Irigoyen has also appeared in the independent films Electrical & Natural Gas Safe, Flight and Nickel or Dime. He co-starred in the Disney Channel series Shake It Up as Martin "Deuce" Martinez, long-time friend to CeCe Jones and Rocky Blue (Bella Thorne and Zendaya). He guest-starred in Charlie Shakes It Up, a first-ever Good Luck Charlie and Shake It Up crossover event that was broadcast on June 5, 2011. Irigoyen sang "Show Ya How" with Kenton Duty which is on the Shake It Up album Live to Dance. He is known for his single "School Girl" and for starring I.aM.mE's dancer Chachi Gonzalez. He was a guest star in "Fresh Off the Boat", portraying Brendan, one of the teenage boys.

He has also played in Underdog Kids. Beginning in 2015, Irigoyen has portrayed Ray Diaz on the TV series The Last Ship.

== Filmography ==
=== Film ===
Year	Title	Role	Notes
2015	Underdog Kids	Wyatt Jones	
2017	The Scorpion's Tale	The Kid	Short
2022	A Brother Story	Jimmy	Short
2023	Centurion XII	Francisco	

=== Television ===
Year	Title	Role	Notes
2009	Wizards of Waverly Place	New Conscience	Episode: "Night at the Lazerama"
2010–2013	Shake It Up	Martin "Deuce" Martinez / Harrison	Main role
2011	Good Luck Charlie	Martin "Deuce" Martinez	Episode: "Charlie Shakes It Up"
2011	Peter Punk	Tito Punk	2 episodes
2012	Whitney		2 episodes
2013	The Garcias Have Landed	Elvis Garcia	TV movie
2014	2 Broke Girls	Hector	Episode: "And the First Degree"
2015	Growing Up and Down	Pete	TV movie
2015	Fresh Off The Boat	Brendan	Episode: "Miracle on Dead Street"
2015	Major Crimes	Jesus Marquez	Episodes: "Hindsight, Part 1" and "Hindsight, Part 5"
2015–2018	The Last Ship	Ray	Recurring role, 17 episodes
2016–2018	The Fosters	Kyle Snow	6 episodes
2016	K.C. Undercover	Tony "The Big Toe" Tolentino Jr.	Episode: "Spy of the Year Awards"
2019–2020	Henry Danger	Brandon	Episodes: "Sister Twister: Part 1" and "Game of Phones"
2019	The Resident	Eric Teter	Episode: "Snowed In"
2020	Away	Isaac Rodriguez	Recurring role, 8 episodes
2021	Fantasy Island	Raul	Episode: "Once Upon a Time in Havana"
2022	Bull	Rafael Ramirez	Episode: "Dark Horse"
2024	Lopez vs Lopez	Orlando	Episode: "Lopez Vs Orlando"

== Discography ==
Year	Title	Other artists	Album
2011	"Monster Mash"	Kenton Duty & Davis Cleveland	Spooky Buddies Soundtrack
2011	"Roam"	Caroline Sunshine, Kenton Duty, Davis Cleveland	Treasure Buddies Soundtrack
2012	"Show Ya How"	Kenton Duty	Shake It Up: Live 2 Dance
2012	"School Girl"	–	Non-album single

== Awards and nominations ==
Year	Award	Category	Work	Result	Ref.
2011	Young Artist Award	Outstanding Young Ensemble In a TV Series (shared with Bella Thorne, Zendaya, Roshon Fegan, Davis Cleveland, Kenton Duty, Caroline Sunshine)	Shake It Up	Nominated	
2012	Young Artist Award	Outstanding Young Ensemble In a TV Series (shared with Bella Thorne, Zendaya, Roshon Fegan, Davis Cleveland, Kenton Duty, Caroline Sunshine)	Shake It Up	Nominated	
2012	ALMA Awards	Favorite TV Actor - Supporting Role in a Comedy	Shake It Up	Nominated	
