= Shake It Up (American TV series) =

American sitcom (2010–2013)

- Genre: Teen sitcom
- Created by: Chris Thompson
- Showrunners: Chris Thompson (season 1); Rob Lotterstein (seasons 2–3)
- Starring: Zendaya; Bella Thorne; Davis Cleveland; Roshon Fegan; Adam Irigoyen; Kenton Duty; Caroline Sunshine
- Theme music composer: Jeanne Lurie, Aris Archontis and Chen Neeman
- Opening theme: "Shake It Up", performed by Selena Gomez & The Scene
- Ending theme: "Shake It Up" (second verse)
- Composers: Eric Goldman; Zed Kelley; Ken Lofkoll; Michael Corcoran
- Country of origin: United States
- Original language: English
- No. of seasons: 3
- No. of episodes: 75 (list of episodes)

Production
- Executive producers: Rob Lotterstein; Chris Thompson (season 1); Jeff Strauss (season 2); Eileen Conn (episode 49–season 3)
- Producer: Frank Pace
- Cinematography: Bryan Hays; Bill Berner; John Simmons
- Camera setup: Videotape (filmized); Multi-camera
- Running time: 23 minutes 48 minutes ("Shake It Up, Up & Away"); 66 minutes ("Made in Japan")
- Production company: It's a Laugh Productions

Original release
- Network: Disney Channel
- Release: November 7, 2010 – November 10, 2013

Related
- Shake It Up (Indian TV series)

Shake It Up is an American sitcom that originally aired on Disney Channel from November 7, 2010, to November 10, 2013. Created by Chris Thompson and starring Bella Thorne and Zendaya, the show follows the adventures of CeCe Jones (Bella Thorne) and Rocky Blue (Zendaya) as they star as background dancers on a local show, Shake It Up Chicago. It also chronicles their misadventures on and off-set and their troubles and rising social status at school. Davis Cleveland, Roshon Fegan, Adam Irigoyen, Kenton Duty and Caroline Sunshine play other main characters in the series. The show's original concept was for Disney to create a female-led buddy comedy with a dance aspect.

On September 29, 2011, Disney Channel announced it had increased Shake It Up's second season order to 26 episodes. A 90-minute special episode Made in Japan aired August 17, 2012, as the season two finale. On June 4, 2012, Disney Channel announced that Shake It Up was renewed for a third season and announced that Kenton Duty would not be a regular cast member for season 3, but would instead make special guest appearances. Despite this announcement, he did not appear in a single episode.

On July 25, 2013, Disney Channel officially announced that Shake It Up would end its run after three seasons. The final episode aired on November 10, 2013.

== Premise ==
Shake It Up follows the adventures of best friends CeCe Jones (Bella Thorne) and Rocky Blue (Zendaya) who, with the help of Rocky's brother Ty (Roshon Fegan) and his best friend Deuce Martinez (Adam Irigoyen), fulfill their dreams of becoming professional dancers when they land roles as dancers on a local show "Shake It Up, Chicago!". CeCe and Rocky must deal with their new circumstances while balancing maintaining their social status at school, watching CeCe's little brother, Flynn (Davis Cleveland), and the antics of their TV show which include matching the skills of their competition, notably brother and sister duo Gunther and Tinka (Kenton Duty and Caroline Sunshine). The show also has storylines which include Ty, who also has dance and rapping skills. Singer and fellow Disney alum Selena Gomez performs the theme song, "Shake It Up", which was featured on the Shake It Up: Break It Down soundtrack.

== Cast ==
- Bella Thorne as CeCe Jones
- Zendaya as Rocky Blue
- Davis Cleveland as Flynn Jones
- Roshon Fegan as Ty Blue
- Adam Irigoyen as Deuce Martinez
- Kenton Duty as Gunther Hessenheffer (seasons 1–2)
- Caroline Sunshine as Tinka Hessenheffer

== Production ==
The show was ordered up as Disney's attempt at its first show starring two female friends as lead characters, but with a dance-driven aspect. Initially carrying the working title Dance, Dance Chicago, the original description was described as the journey of two kids on a contemporary American Bandstand-type show. Veteran television producers Chris Thompson, a former writer for Laverne & Shirley and co-creator of Bosom Buddies and Rob Lotterstein, who had worked on several series including Boy Meets World were assigned to work on the story. Casting for the show began in October 2009. Bella Thorne and Zendaya were cast as the two female leads, as well as Camp Rock cast member Roshon Fegan in a co-lead role. On May 21, 2010, with the title change revealed as Shake It Up, the production for the show was announced to begin in July, and anticipated for a fall 2010 premiere. President of Disney Entertainment, Gary Marsh said the Bella Thorne/Zendaya duo were the most engaging best friends they had seen on the network. On what makes the show different, Marsh said "while buddy comedies have been around since the start of television, ... this is the first time anyone has incorporated dancing into the underlying premise of a sitcom."

The concept of the show has been noted to be very similar to that of fellow Disney Channel series Hannah Montana, and according to The Sun-Sentinel, Shake It Up is the same approach with dance. Additionally, the show is Disney's third series to have a show-within-a-show following "Silverstone" in The Famous Jett Jackson and "So Random/Mackenzie Falls" in Sonny with a Chance. Chuck Barney of the Contra Costa Times said that the show's plots "play out in typical Disney Channel style with uncomplicated story lines, broad humor and moral uplift." In an interview, Bella Thorne said of the show, "It is about them going through the stuff that teens go through every day. The writing is very realistic. I have gone through most of these problems." Rosero McCoy, a choreographer for Camp Rock 2: The Final Jam was tapped to be a choreographer for the show, along with Claude Racine. The series was shot at Los Angeles Center Studios.

The series succeeds Hannah Montana, Jonas, I'm in the Band and Phineas and Ferb as Disney's latest foray into music-oriented series. According to Rick Bently of the Fresno Bee, the show's timing was to capitalize off the success of the current dance series' Dancing with the Stars and So You Think You Can Dance. Original music for the series has been produced and recorded by the show's cast and various artists, with the theme song "Shake It Up" performed by American singer and actress Selena Gomez. The theme was written and produced by Aris Archontis, Jeanne Lurie and Chen Neeman, who also penned the opening title themes to fellow Disney series Sonny with a Chance and Good Luck Charlie.

=== Casting ===
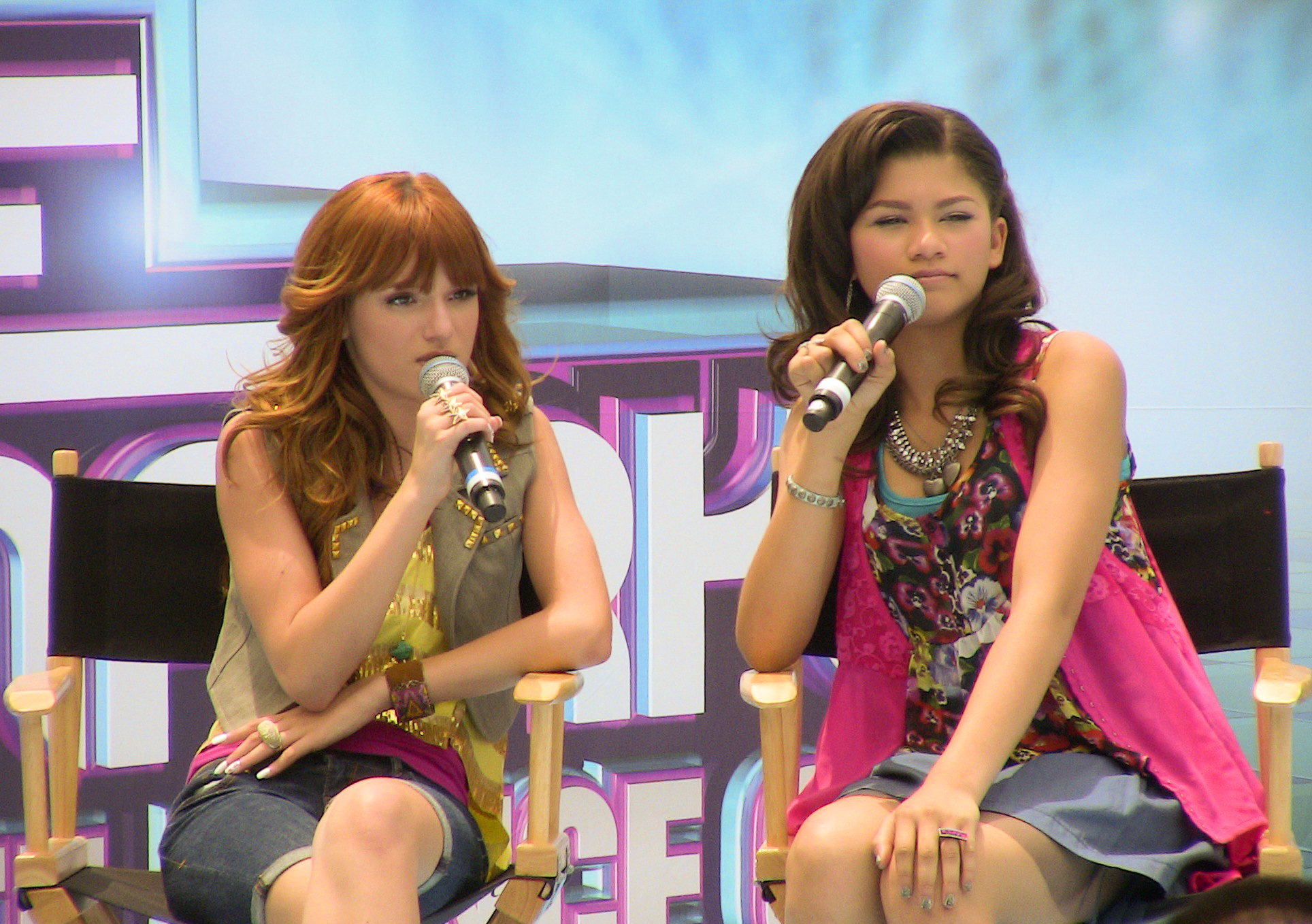
Bella Thorne and Zendaya serve as the series' main central focus duo, CeCe and Rocky.

In initial casting, Disney searched for two female co-leads. Although boasting elaborate credits of prior television experience, including guest starring on Wizards of Waverly Place, Bella Thorne was cast after never dancing professionally before, and took dance classes three times a week to improve. Zendaya had theater background prior to her casting, and grew up in theater when her mother worked in the California Shakespeare Theater in Oakland, California. Having the same agent that discovered Miley Cyrus, she won the role after several auditions and over 200 other hopefuls. On the casting of the two, Judy Taylor, Senior Vice President of Casting for Disney Channel, commented that Zendaya was "completely engaging" with a "great presence" and that Thorne had "high energy" and viewers would "want to get to know her better the instant you meet her." One goal was for the two leads to have chemistry working together, and Thorne said of her relationship with Zendaya, "When we first met, there was this energy. It was like we were meant to be together."

Adam Irigoyen was cast as Deuce Martinez Irigoyen credited his family for his success, moving him out to Los Angeles two years prior for him to start his career. Irigoyen previously worked on Wizards of Waverly Place. Davis Cleveland, whose work included guest appearances on Good Luck Charlie, Zeke and Luther and Hannah Montana, was cast as CeCe's younger brother, Flynn.

Roshon Fegan, who co-starred in both Camp Rock films, was cast as Rocky's older brother Ty. In the recurring role of Gary Wilde, R. Brandon Johnson was cast the day before the pilot and began taping the next day. Kenton Duty was cast as Gunther, after four audition attempts. Stefanie Scott was originally cast as Gunther's twin sister Tinka, but Disney Channel decided to cast her as Lexi on A.N.T. Farm instead. Casting for Tinka ran again and Caroline Sunshine landed the role after canceling plans for a family vacation so she could audition. The brother/sister duo of Gunther and Tinka is said to be inspired by Ryan and Sharpay Evans of Disney's High School Musical series.

Some notable celebrity guest-stars are Renée Taylor, Chris Trousdale, Ben Savage, John D'Aquino, Anneliese van der Pol, Kent Boyd and Cat Deeley of So You Think You Can Dance and America's Best Dance Crew contestants: Jabbawockeez (season 1 winners), Breaks8 (season 1), Quest Crew (season 3 winners), Poreotics (season 5 winners), Jungle Boogie (season 5), Saltare (season 5), IaMmE Crew (season 6 winners), ICONic Boyz (season 6 runners-up), Instant Noodles (season 6), Elektrolytes (season 7 winners) and Beat Freaks (season 3 runners-up).

== Episodes ==
| Season | Episodes | Originally released | |
| Season | Episodes | First released | Last released |
|---|---|---|---|
| 1 | 21 | November 7, 2010 | August 21, 2011 |
| 2 | 28 | September 18, 2011 | August 17, 2012 |
| 3 | 26 | October 14, 2012 | November 10, 2013 |

=== Good Luck Charlie crossover ===
On June 5, 2011, a Good Luck Charlie episode "Charlie Shakes It Up" premiered. In this episode Good Luck Charlie characters Teddy, Amy and Charlie all go to Chicago to visit their great-aunt Nell so they can get into the will and get rich. When they arrive, they take the wrong car and are mistaken for the Duncan Sisters (two famous dancers) on Shake It Up Chicago!. Rocky and CeCe notice that they are imposters when Flynn wants to get the real Duncan Sisters' autograph. After Teddy and Amy explain the truth, the real Duncan Sisters appear into the studio. Deuce locks them into the janitor's closet and Teddy, Amy and Charlie perform. Only CeCe, Rocky, Deuce, Flynn and Gary appeared in the crossover because Disney claimed they only needed "base characters". It was counted as a "Good Luck Charlie" episode and not a "Shake It Up" episode.

=== Season 2 finale special ===
It was announced during the 2011 Licensing International Expo that a Shake It Up movie was in the works. It was confirmed that the movie title would be Shake It Up: Made in Japan and it was also announced that the movie would be 90 minutes long. It was broadcast on August 17, 2012, as an extended length season two final episode.

== Controversy ==
On December 23, 2011, a rebroadcast of the episode "Party It Up", in which a female character (a supermodel) complimented CeCe and Rocky with the line, "I could just eat you guys up...you know, if I ate!", aired on the channel that evening. Former Disney Channel star Demi Lovato, who left Sonny with a Chance in the fall of 2010 for counseling because of personal issues, commented on the episode, criticizing the network through Twitter for normalizing eating disorders when Lovato had struggled through the issue, and as one of the reasons for leaving the company's fold. Disney Channel's public relations account responded to Lovato by stating that that episode and an episode of So Random! which had an eating disorder joke, "1 full meal a week" and "a minute on the lips, forever on the hips" would be pulled from the network's airing cycle and reviewed further. Later in 2012, the episode started airing regularly on Disney Channel with the joke removed. Disney's PR team said the studio never intended to make light of eating disorders.

== Broadcast ==
The series originally aired from November 7, 2010, to November 10, 2013, on Disney Channel. It premiered on November 12, 2010, on Family Channel and Disney Channel (UK and Ireland) and ended on December 6, 2013, and January 31, 2014, respectively. It aired on Disney Channel (Australia and New Zealand) as a preview on December 31, 2010, and premiered on February 25, 2011, and ran until February 13, 2014. The series aired on Disney Channel (Europe, Middle East and Africa) from January 29, 2011, until February 2, 2014. It was also aired on Disney Channel (Southeast Asia) and re-runs are airing on 7Two in Australia.

== Indian adaptation ==
An Indian adaptation of the show, also titled Shake It Up, premiered on Disney Channel India on March 30, 2013. However, it is centered on two teenage boys as opposed to two teenage girls.

== Music ==
=== Soundtrack albums ===
List of albums, with selected chart positions
| Title | Album details | Peak chart positions | | | | | Sales |
| Title | Album details | US | US OST | FRA | MEX | SPA | Sales |
|---|---|---|---|---|---|---|---|
| Shake It Up: Break It Down | Released: July 11, 2011; Formats: CD, digital download; Label: Walt Disney | 22 | 1 | — | 65 | 21 | |
| Shake It Up: Live 2 Dance | Released: March 20, 2012; Formats: CD, digital download; Label: Walt Disney | 13 | 2 | 191 | — | 8 | US: 210,000 |
| Shake It Up: I Love Dance | Released: March 5, 2013; Formats: CD, digital download; Label: Walt Disney | 26 | 2 | — | — | 23 | US: 134,000 |
"—" denotes releases that did not chart or were not released in that territory.

=== Extended plays ===
List of albums
| Title | Album details |
|---|---|
| Made in Japan | Released: August 21, 2012; Format: Digital download; Label: Walt Disney |

=== Singles ===
List of singles, with selected chart positions and certifications
| Title | Year | Peak chart positions | | | | Certifications | Album |
| Title | Year | US | US Heat. | CAN | UK | Certifications | Album |
|---|---|---|---|---|---|---|---|
| "Watch Me" (Bella Thorne and Zendaya) | 2011 | 86 | 9 | — | — | RIAA: Gold | Shake It Up: Break It Down |
| "TTYLXOX" (Bella Thorne) | 2012 | 97 | 15 | 71 | 170 | | Shake It Up: Live 2 Dance |
| "Something to Dance For" (Zendaya) | 2012 | —^{[A]} | — | — | 186 | | Shake It Up: Live 2 Dance |
| "Fashion Is My Kryptonite" (Bella Thorne and Zendaya) | 2012 | — | — | — | — | | Made in Japan |
| "Contagious Love" (Bella Thorne and Zendaya) | 2013 | — | — | — | — | | Shake It Up: I Love Dance |
"—" denotes releases that did not chart or were not released in that territory.

=== Promotional singles ===
List of singles, with selected chart positions
| Title | Year | Peak | Certifications | Album |
| Title | Year | US | Certifications | Album |
|---|---|---|---|---|
| "Shake It Up" (Selena Gomez) | 2010 | — (Note: "Shake It Up" did not enter the Billboard Hot 100, but peaked at number 9 on the Bubbling Under Hot 100 Singles chart.) | RIAA: Gold | Shake It Up: Break It Down |
"—" denotes releases that did not chart or were not released in that territory.

== Reception ==
The series has earned mixed reviews. Tom Gliatto of People magazine gave the series two out of four stars, writing, "Shake It Up doesn't shake up the kid-com formula one bit, but it has something more than the usual shiny-sparkly cuteness." It currently scores a 4.4 out of 10 on TV.com. Currently the most watched episode of the series is "Start It Up" with 6.2 million viewers. The episode "Weird It Up" is the least watched episode, scoring 2.5 million viewers.

=== Ratings ===
According to Nielsen Media Research, the series premiere of Shake It Up garnered 6.2 million viewers and made its debut as the highest-rated series premiere in Disney Channel's 27-year history, followed by Wizards of Waverly Place with 5.9 million viewers, then Liv and Maddie's premiere which had 5.8 million viewers then The Suite Life on Deck's and Austin & Ally's premieres which garnered 5.7 million viewers, and then the March 24, 2006 series premiere of Hannah Montana, which garnered 5.4 million viewers. The premiere scored an 11.0 rating (2.7 million viewers) among the 9-to-14-year-old demographic and a 10.6 rating (2.6 million viewers) among the 6-to-11-year-old demographic. It also became the channel's highest-rated Sunday premiere for an original series on record with total viewers, kids aged 6 to 11 and teens aged 9 to 14.

| Season | List of episodes | First aired | U.S. viewers (in millions) | Last aired | U.S. viewers (in millions) | Average U.S. ratings (viewers in millions) |
|---|---|---|---|---|---|---|
| 1 | 21 | November 7, 2010 | 6.2 | August 21, 2011 | 3.4 | 3.96 (for 19 of 21 episodes) |
| 2 | 28 | September 18, 2011 | 3.6 | August 17, 2012 | 4.5 | 3.41 |
| 3 | 26 | October 15, 2012 | 3.9 | November 10, 2013 | 3.4 | 3.37 |

== Awards and nominations ==
| Year | Award | Category | Nominee(s) | Result | Ref. |
|---|---|---|---|---|---|
| 2011 | Young Artist Awards | Best Performance in a TV Series – Leading Young Actress | Bella Thorne | Won | |
| 2011 | Young Artist Awards | Outstanding Young Ensemble in a TV Series | Bella Thorne, Zendaya, Davis Cleveland, Adam Irigoyen, Roshon Fegan, Caroline Sunshine, Kenton Duty | Nominated | |
| 2011 | Imagen Awards | Best Young Actress – Television | Bella Thorne | Nominated | |
| 2012 | Young Artist Awards | Best Performance in a TV Series – Leading Young Actress | Zendaya | Nominated | |
| 2012 | Young Artist Awards | Best Performance in a TV Series – Leading Young Actress | Bella Thorne | Nominated | |
| 2012 | Young Artist Awards | Best Performance in a TV Series – Recurring Young Actor | Buddy Handleson | Nominated | |
| 2012 | Young Artist Awards | Best Performance in a TV Series – Guest Starring Young Actress 14–16 | Evie Louise Thompson | Nominated | |
| 2012 | Young Artist Awards | Best Performance in a TV Series – Guest Starring Young Actor 11–13 | Zayne Emory | Nominated | |
| 2012 | Young Artist Awards | Best Performance in a TV Series – Guest Starring Young Actress 10 & Under | Caitlin Carmichael | Nominated | |
| 2012 | Young Artist Awards | Outstanding Young Ensemble in a TV Series | Zendaya, Bella Thorne, Davis Cleveland, Adam Irigoyen, Kenton Duty, Caroline Sunshine, Roshon Fegan | Nominated | |
| 2012 | Imagen Awards | Best Young Actress – Television | Bella Thorne | Won | |
| 2012 | Hollywood Teen TV Awards | Bella Thorne | Favorite Television Actress | Nominated | |
| 2012 | Hollywood Teen TV Awards | Favorite Television Show | Shake It Up | Nominated | |
| 2012 | Casting Society of America Awards | Outstanding Achievement in Casting – Children's Series Programming | Howard Meltzer, Suzanne Goddard-Smythe | Nominated | |
| 2012 | NAACP Image Awards | Outstanding Performance in a Youth/Children's Program (Series or Special) | Zendaya | Nominated | |
| 2012 | ALMA Awards | Favorite TV Actress – Comedy | Bella Thorne | Nominated | |
| 2012 | ALMA Awards | Favorite TV Actor – Supporting Role in a Comedy | Adam Irigoyen | Nominated | |
| 2012 | Kids' Choice Awards Mexico | Programa Internacional Favorito | Shake It Up | Nominated | |
