= R. Brandon Johnson =

American actor and television host

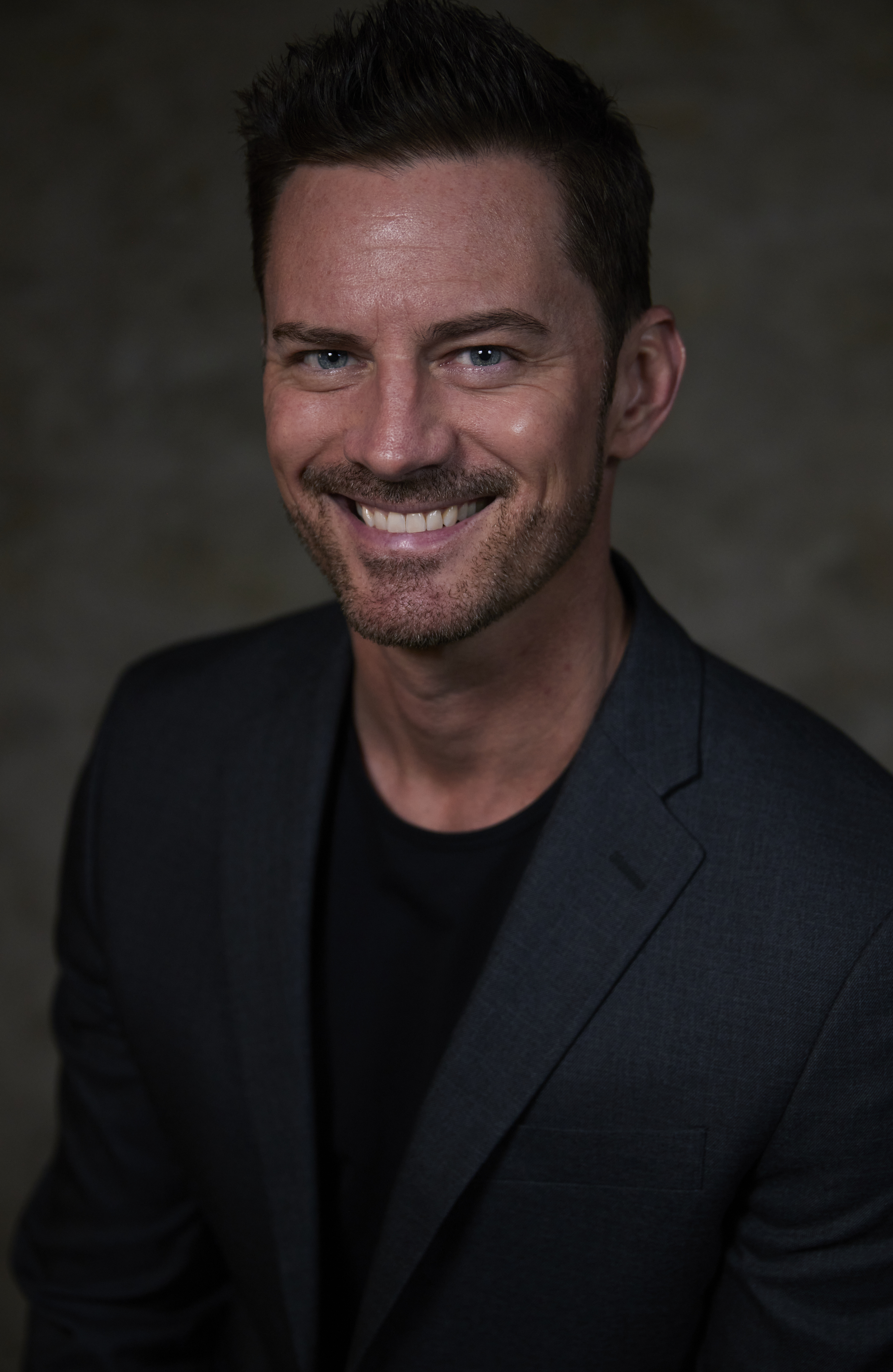
- Born: Richard Brandon Johnson; Bloomington, Minnesota, U.S.
- Other name: Brandon Johnson
- Education: University of Wisconsin–Eau Claire
- Occupations: Actor; television host
- Years active: 1997–present
- Spouse: Ariel Fox (m. 2013)
- Children: 1

Richard Brandon Johnson is an American actor and television host. From 2010 to 2013, he starred as Gary Wilde on the Disney Channel series Shake It Up. He has also hosted the TNT reality competition series 72 Hours.

== Early life and education ==
Johnson was born in Bloomington, Minnesota. He graduated from Bloomington Jefferson High School in 1992 where he was part of the junior varsity hockey team. He is a graduate of the University of Wisconsin–Eau Claire.

== Career ==
Johnson got his first big break on the small screen playing the recurring character Michael McBain on the ABC Daytime series One Life to Live in 2003, playing the role until 2004. Johnson returned to the series in 2007 and in 2008 in the recurring role of Chuck Wilson III, later also playing the character's father Chuck Wilson, Jr. in a 1968 flashback storyline. Johnson appeared in three episodes of the Disney Channel original series Hannah Montana as Brian Winters, the quirky host of a fictional series called Singing with the Stars. The role was a parody of American Idol host Ryan Seacrest. His feature film credits include The Notorious Bettie Page starring Gretchen Mol, the comedy Rick starring Bill Pullman and lead roles in the horror films Malevolence and Little Erin Merryweather, which was an official selection of the Cannes Film Festival.

Johnson has many credits as a television host. He first broke onto the scene as the host of the entertainment show Cool In Your Code, which was shot entirely on the streets of New York City and was nominated for 18 New York Emmy Awards and won 4. He was also the host of HGTV's Get Out Way Out!, My Yard Goes Disney, My House Goes Disney, RV 2013, FOX Soccer Channel's Fox Soccer USA, G4TV's Formula D and Outdoor Life Network's Rally America and USA Network's Character Fantasy and TNT's reality competition series 72 Hours. Johnson also formerly co-starred on the Disney Channel comedy series Shake It Up as Gary Wilde, the host of the fictional dance show Shake It Up, Chicago!.

== Personal life ==
Johnson married Ariel Fox, an interior designer, on May 4, 2013 at Wayfarers Chapel in Rancho Palos Verdes, California. They have one son together.

== Filmography ==
=== Film ===
Year	Title	Role	Notes
2002	Fabled	James	
2003	Little Erin Merryweather	Teddy McGovern	
2003	Invisible Evidence	Marcel	
2003	Rick	Fawning Exec	
2004	Malevolence	Julian	
2005	The Notorious Bettie Page	Billy Page	Uncredited
2016	The Devil's Dolls	Todd	
2016	Fishes 'n Loaves: Heaven Sent	Officer Barney	
2018	High Voltage	Weatherman	
2018	Malevolence 3: Killer	Julian	
2023	Switch Up	Marcus	
2024	Protocol-7	Josh Koprowski	

=== Television ===
Year	Title	Role	Notes
1997	Dave's World	Billy	Episode: "Playdate with a Playmate"
2000	3rd Rock from the Sun	LJ	Episode: "Les Liaisons Dickgereuses"
2001	Boston Public	Sam	Episode: "Chapter Ten"
2003	CSI: Miami	Trey Hanson	Episode: "Spring Break"
2003–2008	One Life to Live	Michael McBain	25 episodes
2007	Hannah Montana	Brian Winters	3 episodes
2010–2013	Shake It Up	Gary Wilde / Perry Collins	30 episodes
2011	Good Luck Charlie	Gary Wilde	Episode: "Charlie Shakes It Up"
2014	Firsts	Matt	Episode: "First I Do"
2015	Henry Danger	Rick Richards	Episode: "Let's Make a Steal"
