= Roshon Fegan =

American actor and musician (born 1991)

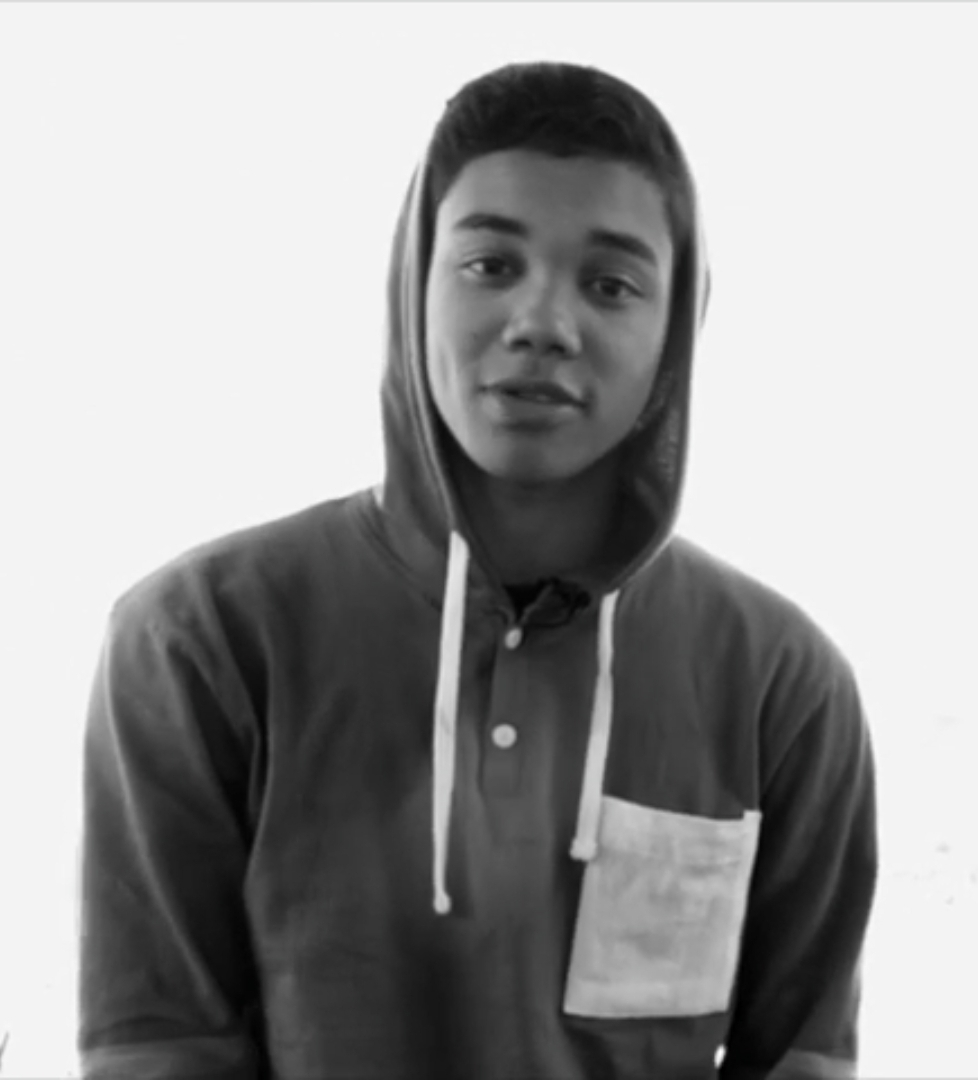
- Fegan in 2012
- Born: Roshon Bernard Fegan; October 6, 1991 (age 34); Los Angeles, California, U.S.
- Occupations: Actor; rapper; dancer
- Years active: 2004–present
- Known for: Camp Rock; Camp Rock 2; Shake It Up
- Father: Roy Fegan
- Musical career
- Also known as: ROSHON; RO SHON
- Label: 3inaRo Entertainment

Roshon Bernard Fegan (/rəˈʃɒn ˈfeɪɡən/ rə-SHON FAY-gən; born October 6, 1991), known mononymously as Roshon (stylized in all caps, formerly as RO SHON), is an American actor, rapper, and dancer. He is best known for his roles as Ty Blue on the Disney Channel original series Shake It Up (2010–13) and as Sander Loyer in the Disney Channel movie franchise Camp Rock (2008–10). He writes and produces his own music as well as working with the president of Lava/Universal Republic. In 2012, Roshon appeared on Dancing with the Stars.

== Early life ==
Roshon Bernard Fegan was born on October 6, 1991, in Los Angeles, California. His father is African American actor and producer Roy Fegan, whose television credits include The Shield, Married... with Children, The Meteor Man, and Will & Grace, among others. His mother is of Filipino descent. Raised in Los Angeles, Roshon Fegan had studied at the BK Acting Studio and the USC 32nd Street Performing Arts School as well as attending Tom Bradley Elementary, then Hollywood High School, before leaving to be home-schooled to accommodate his acting career.

== Career ==
Fegan began his acting career at the age of 12 with a small role in the 2004 film Spider-Man 2, followed by an appearance in 2006 on the TV series Monk. In 2008, he appeared in the comedy film Drillbit Taylor and the VC FilmFest Award winning film Baby. In June 2008, Fegan gained popular notoriety as Sander Loyer in the Disney Channel original movie Camp Rock, which was the number one entertainment telecast on cable TV in 2008, with the Jonas Brothers. He also performed songs on the Camp Rock soundtrack as well as the DVD bonus track Camp Rock. In 2010, Fegan reprised his role as Sander in Camp Rock 2: The Final Jam, the sequel to Camp Rock. Roshon also co-starred on the Disney Channel original series Shake It Up! as Ty Blue, Rocky's (played by Zendaya) older brother.

Fegan was featured on the 14th season of the ABC show Dancing with the Stars. Chelsie Hightower was announced as Roshon's ballroom dance partner. He stayed on for eight weeks and was placed in the top 6.

Roshon is also a songwriter, producer, artist and freestyle dancer who learned his moves by watching Michael Jackson and other influential dancers. A drummer since the age of two, Fegan also plays the piano and guitar. He released a number of singles on iTunes and his first self-produced EP I AM RO SHON, was released under his own label, "3inaRo Entertainment", in 2011. The name 3inaRo (pronounced "three-in-a-row") is a reference to being a triple-threat entertainer in his three passions: acting, freestyle dancing, and music.

== Filmography ==
=== Film ===
Year	Title	Role	Notes
2004	Spider-Man 2	Amazed Kid #2	
2007	Baby	Young Robbie	
2008	Drillbit Taylor	Random Kid #2	
2014	Mostly Ghostly: Have You Met My Ghoulfriend?	Nicky Roland	Direct to video
2018	What Still Remains	David	

=== Television ===
Year	Title	Role	Notes
2006	Monk	Third Boy	Episode: "Mr. Monk and the Astronaut"
2008	Camp Rock	Sander Loyer	Television film
2010	Camp Rock 2: The Final Jam	Sander Loyer	Television film
2010–2013	Shake It Up	Ty Blue	Main role
2011	Kickin' It	Dan "Smooth" Brennan	Episode: "All the Wrong Moves"
2012	Dancing with the Stars	Himself / Contestant	Season 14
2012	Motorcity	Darr Gordy	Voice, episode: "Reunion"
2014	A.N.T. Farm	Hudson	Episode: "The New York ExperiANTs"
2014	Parenthood	4D Member	Episode: "Cold Feet"
2015	Crazy Ex-Girlfriend	Nguyen	Episode: "My Mom, Greg's Mom and Josh's Sweet Dance Moves!"
2017–2018	Greenleaf	Isaiah Hambrick	Recurring role
2018	Insecure	Spyder	2 episodes
2019	The Bobby DeBarge Story	Bobby DeBarge	Lead role
2019–2020	DreamWorks Dragons: Rescue Riders	Elbone (voice)	Recurring role
2020	Glitch Techs	Casino (voice)	Episode: "Smashozaurs"

=== Music videos ===
Year	Title	Artist
2008	"We Rock" (Cast Video)	Cast of Camp Rock
2008	"Start the Party"	Jordan Francis and Roshon Fegan
2010	"It's On"	Cast of Camp Rock 2: The Final Jam

== Discography ==
=== Singles ===
2006	Whatcha Know About Me	TBA	Songwriter, producer
2011	I AM	RO SHON	Songwriter, producer
2011	Love Your Love	RO SHON	Songwriter, producer
2011	Oh Oh Oh	RO SHON	Songwriter, producer
2011	Get It Poppin	RO SHON	Songwriter, producer
2013	Afterparty (with Caroline Sunshine)	Shake It Up: I Love Dance	Songwriter, producer
2014	Bout That	RO SHON	Songwriter, producer
2016	They Not Ready 4 `You	RO SHON	Songwriter, producer
2016	So Bad	TBA	Songwriter, producer
2016	Hate Me Or Love Me	ROS HON	Songwriter, producer
2017	Gotta Know	ROS HON	Songwriter, producer
2017	Oh Well	ROS HON	Songwriter, producer

== Awards and nominations ==
Year	Award	Category	Work	Result	Ref.
2011	Young Artist Awards	Outstanding Young Ensemble In a TV Series (shared with Bella Thorne, Zendaya, Davis Cleveland, Adam Irigoyen, Kenton Duty, Caroline Sunshine)	Shake It Up	Nominated	
2012	Young Artist Awards	Outstanding Young Ensemble In a TV Series (shared with Bella Thorne, Zendaya, Davis Cleveland, Adam Irigoyen, Kenton Duty, Caroline Sunshine)	Shake It Up	Nominated	
