= Davis Cleveland =

American actor (born 2002)

- Born: Davis Richard Cleveland; February 5, 2002 (age 24); Houston, Texas, U.S.
- Occupations: Actor, dental student
- Years active: 2007–2022

External image
- Cleveland at an event for The Odd Life of Timothy Green in 2012

Davis Richard Cleveland (born February 5, 2002) is an American dentist and former child actor. He is known for his role as Flynn Jones on the Disney Channel original series Shake It Up. Cleveland starred as Manny in the 2016 Nickelodeon Original Movie Rufus and its 2017 sequel Rufus 2.

== Life and career ==
Cleveland was born Davis Richard Cleveland on February 5, 2002, in Houston, Texas. Cleveland was living in Los Angeles, California, in 2011, and enjoys studying martial arts and playing guitar, as well as other hobbies including video games, skateboarding and rollerblading.

In 2010, Cleveland began playing the role of CeCe's younger brother, Flynn Jones, on the Disney Channel comedy Shake It Up. In March 2011, he spoke with Tanya Rivero on Good Morning America of his experience working on Shake It Up stating, "It's the best experience ever. It's like Disney World every morning."

His other television appearances include an episode of How I Met Your Mother, Desperate Housewives and Good Luck Charlie, Ghost Whisperer, and Hannah Montana. He also played the part of Luther's little brother Roy in Zeke and Luther.

Cleveland starred in the Nickelodeon Original Movie, Rufus, which also starred Jace Norman and was released on January 18, 2016. He starred in the film's sequel Rufus 2 which was released on January 16, 2017.

== Personal life ==
He is involved in charity work by helping to raise money to help find a cure for cystic fibrosis through hosting cystic fibrosis walks and various other charities.

Cleveland began attending Texas A&M University School of Dentistry in 2024.

== Filmography ==
=== Film ===
Year	Title	Role	Notes
2013	Alone for Christmas	Dillon	Direct-to-video film
2016	Rufus	Manny	Nickelodeon Original Movie
2017	Rufus 2	Manny	Nickelodeon Original Movie
2022	Birdies	Tournament Crowd	

=== Television ===
Year	Title	Role	Notes
2008	Criminal Minds	Ricky	Episode: "Masterpiece"
2008	How I Met Your Mother	Andy	Episode: "The Fight"
2009	Ghost Whisperer	Tyler Harmon	Episode: "Birthday Presence"
2009	Desperate Housewives	Jeffrey	Episode: "The Story of Lucy and Jessie"
2010–2013	Shake It Up	Flynn Jones	Main role
2010–2011	Zeke and Luther	Roy Waffles	Episodes: "Little Bro", "Big Trouble", "Sibling Rivalries"
2010	Hannah Montana	Little Boy	Episodes: "Sweet Home Hannah Montana", "Hannah Montana to the Principal's Office"
2010	Pair of Kings	Chauncey	Episode: "Big Kings on Campus"
2011	Good Luck Charlie	Walker / Flynn Jones	Episodes: "Snow Show Part 2", "Charlie Shakes It Up"
2014	Rizzoli & Isles	Zach Langley	Episode: "Tears of a Clown"
2016	Legendary Dudas	Icuzio	Episode: "Un Film de Duda/Homeroom Wars"

== Awards and nominations ==
Award	Year	Category	Work	Result	Ref.
Young Artist Award	2011	Outstanding Young Ensemble In a TV Series (Note: Shared with Bella Thorne, Zendaya, Roshon Fegan, Adam Irigoyen, Kenton Duty, Caroline Sunshine)	Shake It Up	Nominated	
Young Artist Award	2012	Outstanding Young Ensemble In a TV Series	Shake It Up	Nominated	
