= List of Dream On episodes =

Episodes of HBO adult sitcom

Dream On, an adult-themed sitcom created by David Crane and Marta Kauffman, aired on HBO from July 8, 1990, to March 27, 1996. The series aired for a total of six seasons, consisting of 120 episodes.

== Series overview ==
| Season | Episodes | Originally released | |
| Season | Episodes | First released | Last released |
|---|---|---|---|
| 1 | 14 | July 8, 1990 | October 7, 1990 |
| 2 | 15 | July 7, 1991 | October 6, 1991 |
| 3 | 26 | June 6, 1992 | November 21, 1992 |
| 4 | 25 | June 2, 1993 | March 30, 1994 |
| 5 | 13 | June 22, 1994 | September 14, 1994 |
| 6 | 27 | July 19, 1995 | March 27, 1996 |

== Episodes ==
=== Season 1 (1990) ===
| No. overall | No. in season | Title | Directed by | Written by | Original release date |
|---|---|---|---|---|---|
| 1 | 1 | "The First Episode" | John Landis | Marta Kauffman & David Crane | July 8, 1990 |
| 2 | 2 | "Death Takes a Coffee Break" | Betty Thomas | Marta Kauffman & David Crane | July 15, 1990 |
| 3 | 3 | "Sex and the Single Father" | Arlene Sanford | Marta Kauffman & David Crane | July 22, 1990 |
| 4 | 4 | "Sole Sister" | Arlene Sanford | Bernie Keating | July 29, 1990 |
| 5 | 5 | "Angst for the Memories" | Arlene Sanford | Marta Kauffman & David Crane | August 5, 1990 |
| 6 | 6 | "...And Sheep Are Nervous" | Betty Thomas | Jeff Greenstein & Jeff Strauss | August 12, 1990 |
| 7 | 7 | "Over Your Dead Body" | Betty Thomas | Dava Savel | August 19, 1990 |
| 8 | 8 | "Martin Gets Lucky" | Jonathan Kaufer | Jonathan Kaufer | August 26, 1990 |
| 9 | 9 | "Three Coins in the Dryer" | Betty Thomas | Jeff Greenstein & Jeff Strauss | September 2, 1990 |
| 10 | 10 | "The Trojan War" | Betty Thomas | Dava Savel | September 9, 1990 |
| 11 | 11 | "Up the River" | Arlene Sanford | Marta Kauffman & David Crane | September 16, 1990 |
| 12 | 12 | "555-HELL" | Betty Thomas | Bernie Keating | September 23, 1990 |
| 13 | 13 | "Doing the Bossa Nova" | Arlene Sanford | Jeff Greenstein & Jeff Strauss | September 30, 1990 |
| 14 | 14 | "Premarital Ex" | Arlene Sanford | Marta Kauffman & David Crane | October 7, 1990 |

=== Season 2 (1991) ===
| No. overall | No. in season | Title | Directed by | Written by | Original release date |
|---|---|---|---|---|---|
| 15 | 1 | "The Second Greatest Story Ever Told: Parts 1 & 2" | John Landis | Marta Kauffman & David Crane | July 7, 1991 |
| 16 | 2 | "The Second Greatest Story Ever Told: Parts 1 & 2" | John Landis | Marta Kauffman & David Crane | July 7, 1991 |
| 17 | 3 | "And Your Little Dog, Too" | Catherine O'Hara | Marta Kauffman & David Crane | July 14, 1991 |
| 18 | 4 | "The 37-Year Itch" | Betty Thomas | Dava Savel | July 21, 1991 |
| 19 | 5 | "Calling the Kettle Black" | Peter Baldwin | Jeff Greenstein & Jeff Strauss | July 28, 1991 |
| 20 | 6 | "Futile Attraction" | Arlene Sanford | Marta Kauffman & David Crane | August 4, 1991 |
Martin starts dating a patient of Judith, not realizing that he is putting himself in danger.
| 21 | 7 | "No, I'm Just Happy to See You" | Arlene Sanford | Jeff Greenstein & Jeff Strauss | August 11, 1991 |
After getting mugged, Martin decides to buy a gun and has a most unusual confrontation with a burglar.
| 22 | 8 | "What I Did for Lust" | Bethany Rooney | Theresa Rebeck | August 18, 1991 |
| 23 | 9 | "Play Melville for Me" | Arlene Sanford | Craig Hoffman | August 25, 1991 |
| 24 | 10 | "To Have and Have and Have and Have Not" | John Axness | Craig Hoffman | September 1, 1991 |
| 25 | 11 | "Pants on Fire" | Arlene Sanford | Marta Kauffman & David Crane | September 8, 1991 |
| 26 | 12 | "The Charlotte Letter" | Peter Baldwin | Tom Leopold | September 15, 1991 |
Martin discovers the new love of his life used to be a porn actress.
| 27 | 13 | "The Name of the Game Is Five-Card Stud" | Rob Thompson | Theresa Rebeck | September 22, 1991 |
| 28 | 14 | "So Funny I Forgot to Laugh" | Betty Thomas | Jeff Greenstein & Jeff Strauss | September 29, 1991 |
Martin is unnerved when his stand-up comic girlfriend uses material about him in her act.
| 29 | 15 | "Toby or Not Toby" | Bethany Rooney | Elaine Aronson | October 6, 1991 |

=== Season 3 (1992) ===
| No. overall | No. in season | Title | Directed by | Written by | Original release date |
|---|---|---|---|---|---|
| 30 | 1 | "And Bimbo Was His Name-O: Parts 1 & 2" | Eric Laneuville | Marta Kauffman & David Crane | June 6, 1992 |
| 31 | 2 | "And Bimbo Was His Name-O: Parts 1 & 2" | Eric Laneuville | Marta Kauffman & David Crane | June 6, 1992 |
| 32 | 3 | "Nightmare on Bleecker Street" | John Landis | Stephen Engel | June 13, 1992 |
Toby is having nightmares in which she murders Martin.
| 33 | 4 | "For Peter's Sake" | Betty Thomas | Marta Kauffman & David Crane | June 20, 1992 |
Note- In 1993 this episode won the Emmy for Outstanding Directing in a Comedy Series.
| 34 | 5 | "Terms of Employment" | Bethany Rooney | Stephen Engel | June 27, 1992 |
Martin is on top of the world after editing a best selling book and on top of a gorgeous blonde actress he is in a relationship with. Gibby tries to force Martin to take a pay cut and Martin quits instead, leaving himself unemployed.
| 35 | 6 | "For Richard or for Poorer" | Peter Baldwin | Andrew Gordon & Eileen Conn | July 4, 1992 |
Martin coughs up a kidney for Richard.. for Judith.
| 36 | 7 | "Bad Girls" | Betty Thomas | Michael Curtis & Greg Malins | July 11, 1992 |
Martin disapproves of Jeremy's juvenile delinquent girlfriend but nevertheless ends up getting involved with her similarly-inclined mother (Adrienne Barbeau).
| 37 | 8 | "Here Comes the Bribe" | Betty Thomas | Andrew Gordon & Eileen Conn | July 18, 1992 |
While having sex, Martin gets the inspiration for a great idea for a book. He goes to Gibby with the idea, but wants Marin to help him. In order to avoid being deported, Gibby has to marry Toby, at a high price.
| 38 | 9 | "May Divorce Be with You" | Bethany Rooney | Martha Kauffman & David Crane | July 25, 1992 |
Martin has difficulty coping with the divorce of his parents.
| 39 | 10 | "Come and Knock on Our Door..." | John Landis | Andrew Gordon & Eileen Conn | August 1, 1992 |
Martin and Eddie are both interested in a network executive Alisha (Courteney Cox), and she proposes that they have a threesome.
| 40 | 11 | "B.S. Elliot" | Michael McKean | Theresa Rebeck | August 8, 1992 |
When "editing" the manuscript of a famous but difficult author, Martin learns what it truly means to be a writer.
| 41 | 12 | "What Women Want" | Bethany Rooney | Theresa Rebeck | August 15, 1992 |
Martin competes for the affections of his new girlfriend with her former lesbian lover Ryan (Jennifer Tilly).
| 42 | 13 | "Red All Over" | Bethany Rooney | Jeff Greenstein & Jeff Strauss | August 22, 1992 |
Martin begins dating an African-American woman who ends up being more interested in Eddie.
| 43 | 14 | "The Rocky Marriage Picture Show" | Bethany Rooney | Howard J. Morris | August 29, 1992 |
Martin and Judith decide to divide their old photographs, and in the process they recall old memories.
| 44 | 15 | "Martin Over Medium" | Bethany Rooney | Andrew Gordon & Eileen Conn | September 5, 1992 |
After a co-worker dies, Martin visits a medium. Features John Landis trademark line "I'll see you next Wednesday"
| 45 | 16 | "Theory of Relativity" | Art Wolff | Howard J. Morris | September 12, 1992 |
Martin and his cousin are wildly attracted to each other; hilarity ensues.
| 46 | 17 | "Up All Night" | Paul Miller | Michael Curtis & Greg Malins | September 19, 1992 |
A meek author's manuscript is shredded by his vengeful wife, so he, Martin and Toby have to stay up all night to reassemble it to meet the deadline.
| 47 | 18 | "The Guilty Party" | John Axness | Jeff Greenstein & Jeff Strauss | September 26, 1992 |
A bachelor party for Eddie takes an unexpected turn when deep, dark secrets are revealed.
| 48 | 19 | "The Son Also Rises" | Betty Thomas | Jeff Greenstein & Jeff Strauss | October 3, 1992 |
Martin finds his condoms missing when he is having sex, and then realized that only one person could have taken them. His son, Jeremy.
| 49 | 20 | "Domestic Bliss" | Arlene Sanford | Jeffrey Klarik & Greg Cope | October 10, 1992 |
Martin falls for Judith's beautiful Mexican maid (Salma Hayek) and then feels uncomfortable that she is "just" a maid.
| 50 | 21 | "It Came from Beneath the Sink" | John Landis | Marta Kauffman & David Crane | October 17, 1992 |
Martin battles a giant rat that has invaded his apartment, which interferes in a very promising relationship with a co-worker he dreams about.
| 51 | 22 | "No Deposit, No Return" | Paul Lazarus | Stephen Engel | October 24, 1992 |
Martin is asked by an old friend (Jenny Agutter) to be her sperm donor.
| 52 | 23 | "To the Moon, Alex!" | Kevin S. Bright | Craig Hoffman | October 31, 1992 |
Martin and Toby face underhanded competition from back-stabbing new editor Alex (Matthew Perry) and his scheming secretary Skylar.
| 53 | 24 | "The Undergraduate" | John Axness | Stephen Engel | November 7, 1992 |
Martin begins dating the college student who delivers bagels to his office. Martin ends up giving her multiple orgasms when they have sex. Martin meets her mother, and begins to fall for her.
| 54 | 25 | "Dance Ten, Sex Three" | Nick Marck | Howard J. Morris | November 14, 1992 |
Martin convinces the mother of the college student to go on a date with him. They hit it off but have below average sex. They almost break up because of it, just before having an epic session which keeps the relationship alive.
| 55 | 26 | "Key for Two" | Betty Thomas | Jeff Greenstein & Jeff Strauss | November 21, 1992 |
Martin asks Kate (the mother of the college student he was dating) if she wants to move in with him. Kate moves in and vacuums the apartment. Judith comes over to see Jeremy and meets Kate, an awkward conversation ensues. Kate vacuums some more and then hangs some plants before discovering Martin's telescope which is pointed at the apartment of a woman who is vacuuming in the nude. After watching the nude woman for a moment Martin and Kate have sex in a pile of bubble wrap. In the afterglow Kate suggests it's strange that Judith has a key to Martin's apartment, jealousy and hilarity ensue.

=== Season 4 (1993–94) ===
| No. overall | No. in season | Title | Directed by | Written by | Original release date |
|---|---|---|---|---|---|
| 56 | 1 | "Oral Sex, Lies and Videotape" | John Landis | Jeff Greenstein & Jeff Strauss | June 2, 1993 |
Martin accidentally films a beloved children's television host with a prostitute. Eddie offers him a quarter million dollars for the footage but Martin's payday comes at a cost. (This episode features many notable guests including Tom Poston, James Woods, Elisabeth Shue, Phyllis Diller, Jason Alexander and more)
| 57 | 2 | "The French Conception" | Eric Laneuville | Stephen Engel | June 9, 1993 |
Martin, still living with Kate, needs to find a tenant for his empty apartment. Julie, Kate's daughter and Martin's ex, asks Martin for financial help with an abortion. Later, Kate confronts Martin when a bill for the procedure comes.
| 58 | 3 | "Depth Be Not Proud" | Peter Baldwin | Stephen Engel | June 16, 1993 |
Eddie gets fired so he and Martin plan to start a magazine together.
| 59 | 4 | "Pop Secret" | Betty Thomas | Andrew Gordon & Eileen Conn | June 23, 1993 |
Martin's father Mickey (Paul Dooley) decides to live close to his son in New York, with a new friend, which causes Martin to suspect that Mickey may be gay.
| 60 | 5 | "Reach Out and Touch Yourself" | Nick Marck | Stephen Engel | June 30, 1993 |
Toby convinces Martin to invest in her stock advice hotline, which ends up turning into a phone sex line.
| 61 | 6 | "Home Sweet Homeboy" | Debra Hill | Jeff Greenstein & Jeff Strauss | July 7, 1993 |
An African-American client of Martin guests on Eddie's show and accuses him of not being "black enough".
| 62 | 7 | "A Midsummer Night´s Dream On" | Betty Thomas | Leslie Gaveny | July 14, 1993 |
| 63 | 8 | "The Book, the Thief, Her Boss and His Lover" | Kevin S. Bright | Jeffrey Klarik | July 21, 1993 |
Toby's mother makes her feel really bad about her life. A beautiful widow has a book written by her husband who was a famous author, however she doesn't want her husband's name on the book due to the content. Toby blackmails Martin into putting her name on the book, Martin takes the widow as his lover (Gates McFadden).
| 64 | 9 | "Super Freak" | Paul Lazarus | Mindy Schneider | July 28, 1993 |
During a heatwave, Martin wants the superintendent of his building to fix his broken airco. Little does Martin know that the superintendent has moved to Florida …and that his hot young daughter (Elizabeth Peña) has taken over the job.
| 65 | 10 | "One Ball, Two Strikes" | Michael Engler | Jeff Greenstein & Jeff Strauss | August 4, 1993 |
Martin has an affair with Gibby's girlfriend. Gibby confesses an intimate inadequacy to Martin.
| 66 | 11 | "Portrait by the Artist on the Young Man" | John Landis | Mindy Schneider | August 11, 1993 |
Jeremy gets a tattoo and Martin's not happy about it.
| 67 | 12 | "And Bobby Makes Three" | Rina Sternfeld Allon | Eileen Conn & Andrew Gordon | August 18, 1993 |
While Richard is away in Estonia, Martin accompanies Judith to birthing class where he meets an old high school sweetheart.
| 68 | 13 | "Silent Night, Holy Cow, Part 1" | Betty Thomas | David Crane & Marta Kauffman | December 18, 1993 |
It's Christmas and a very pregnant Judith goes on a trip with Martin to receive a present for Richard, who's visiting the Pope. Jeremy has his first sexual experience and Eddie has two dates on the same evening. Toby has a vision of the Virgin Mary in the broken glass of Martin's door.
| 69 | 14 | "Silent Night, Holy Cow, Part 2" | Betty Thomas | David Crane & Marta Kauffman | December 18, 1993 |
Eddie has a fight with Santa Claus while Toby considers joining a convent. Judith goes into labor with only Martin there to help deliver the baby, in a barn near the town of Bethlehem. Jeremy gains more sexual experiences with Marybeth (Robin Tunney), an 'older' woman.
| 70 | 15 | "Brother of the Bride" | Peter Baldwin | Jeffrey Klarik | January 19, 1994 |
Martin's sister Susan wants to get married in a small ceremony without the family knowing. Nevertheless, the whole family ends up getting involved, planning a big wedding party.
| 71 | 16 | "Blinded by the Cheese" | Kevin S. Bright | Stephen Engel | January 26, 1994 |
A cheese fondue accident leaves Martin temporarily blinded and in hospital. Unable to see, he still manages to meet a cute nurse, who, he discovers later on, is slightly older than his usual conquests.
| 72 | 17 | "Hey, Nanny Nanny" | Ron Wolotzky | Brian Herskowitz | February 2, 1994 |
Martin convinces Judith to hire his out-of-work-actress girlfriend as a nanny for the new baby.
| 73 | 18 | "The Second Coming" | Jonathan Prince | Linda Mathious & Heather MacGillvray | February 9, 1994 |
Martin organises a surprise birthday party for Judith while Toby discovers what type of man she is dating.
| 74 | 19 | "Martin Tupper in 'Magnum Farce'" | John Landis | Eileen Conn & Andrew Gordon | February 16, 1994 |
While Martin is dating a co-worker, a husband-and-wife author team have marital problems affecting their writing despite an imminent deadline. He refers them to Judith, who advises them to focus on the relationship instead of on the book. Martin becomes the center of drama and revenge sex.
| 75 | 20 | "Where There's Smoke, You're Fired" | Mary Kay Place | Bob Kushell | February 23, 1994 |
During Gibby's holiday, Martin's in charge of the company but he receives instructions to fire one of the editors. Judith is experiencing a professional crisis.
| 76 | 21 | "Blame it on Reo" | Michael Engler | Eileen Conn & Andrew Gordon | March 2, 1994 |
Jeremy has a date with a kinky young actress and Martin discovers Jeremy has had sex even before that date.
| 77 | 22 | "From Here to Paternity" | Mel Smith | Bob Kushell | March 9, 1994 |
Eddie finds out the consequences of sleeping with Martin's girlfriend (Pam Dawber) back when they were in high school.
| 78 | 23 | "A Face Worse Than Death" | Ron Wolotzky | Jeffrey Klarik | March 16, 1994 |
Martin's mom decides to have a face-lift, but doesn't want to tell her current boyfriend.
| 79 | 24 | "Felines... Nothing More Than Felines" | Michael McKean | Jeffrey Klarik | March 23, 1994 |
Toby has to deal with the loss of her beloved cat, Mr. Snuffles, while Martin and Gibby try to convince Kitty Kelley to become a client.
| 80 | 25 | "Stone Cold" | Peter Baldwin | Jeff Greenstein & Jeff Strauss | March 30, 1994 |
Richard, Judith, Jeremy and the baby are moving to Washington D.C. Martin is despondent, but events take an unexpected turn.

=== Season 5 (1994) ===
| No. overall | No. in season | Title | Directed by | Written by | Original release date |
|---|---|---|---|---|---|
| 81 | 1 | "The Taking of Pablum 1-2-3: Part 1 & 2" | Ron Wolotzky | Stephen Engel | June 22, 1994 |
| 82 | 2 | "The Taking of Pablum 1-2-3: Part 1 & 2" | Ron Wolotzky | Stephen Engel | June 22, 1994 |
At Richard Stone's memorial service, Martin and baby Richard are kidnapped by two screenwriters. However, the police think Martin's the kidnapper. Martin makes a deal with the kidnappers, but it turns out he remains the unsung hero.
| 83 | 3 | "'Tis Pity She’s a Neighbor" | Lisa Gottlieb | Bill Prady | July 6, 1994 |
When the neighbors keep Martin up all night with their sounds of love-making, he discovers they are prostitutes.
| 84 | 4 | "Steinway to Heaven" | Eric Laneuville | Daryl Rowland & Lisa DeBenedictis | July 13, 1994 |
Martin’s mom Doris dies during a visit to New York. In the process of distributing her belongings, Martin comes across a piano which leads him to find out a secret about his mother’s past.
| 85 | 5 | "Judy and the Beast" | Nick Marck | Bill Prady | July 20, 1994 |
After Richard’s death, Martin wants to reconnect with Judith. Instead she connects with Gibby!
| 86 | 6 | "The Homecoming Queen" | Nick Marck | Stephen Engel | July 27, 1994 |
Eddie talks Martin into going to a high-school reunion. Martin’s old flame shows up too …as does her psycho almost-ex-husband.
| 87 | 7 | "I’m With Stupid" | Ron Wolotzky | Victor Levin | August 3, 1994 |
Martin is tired of dating women who are not smart, but when Judith sets him up with a member of her late husband’s think-tank, he gets more than he bargained for.
| 88 | 8 | "Attack of the 59-Inch Woman" | John Landis | Elin Hampton & David Furry | August 10, 1994 |
When Martin injures himself having sex, he has to work from home. Toby over-interprets her role as his secretary…
| 89 | 9 | "Those Who Can’t, Edit" | Mary Kay Place | Tom Maxwell & Don Woodard | August 17, 1994 |
Martin feels sidelined when his Assistant Editor and girlfriend Kay (Catherine Bell) edits Jeremy’s sci-fi novel.
| 90 | 10 | "Off-Off Broadway Bound" | John Landis | Elin Hampton & David Furry | August 24, 1994 |
Eddie agrees to finance Martin’s play, directed by yet another new girlfriend of Martin’s (Cynthia Stevenson). But there is one condition.
| 91 | 11 | "Hack Like Me" | Ron Wolotzky | Daryl Rowland & Lisa DeBenedictis | August 31, 1994 |
Gibby makes Toby an Associate Editor.
| 92 | 12 | "I Never Promised You Charoses, Martin" | John Landis | Victor Levin | September 7, 1994 |
Much to Martin’s concern, Jeremy takes a Bible class. A religious battle between Martin and Judith ensues.
| 93 | 13 | "The Courtship of Martin’s Father" | John Landis | Tom Maxwell & Don Woodard | September 14, 1994 |
Martin decides to help his father find a new boyfriend.

=== Season 6 (1995–96) ===
| No. overall | No. in season | Title | Directed by | Written by | Original release date |
|---|---|---|---|---|---|
| 94 | 1 | "Try Not to Remember" | Robby Benson | Bill Prady | July 19, 1995 |
As Martin has problems reaching an orgasm, he starts seeing a psychologist. Once she suggests he was molested in his childhood by an uncle, he starts going nuts.
| 95 | 2 | "Bess You Is Not My Woman Now" | Robert Ginty | Tom Maxwell & Don Woodard | July 26, 1995 |
Recently divorced, Judith’s old friend Bess (Annette O’Toole) comes to New York. Martin always believed there was a sexual tension between him and Bess and wants to release it …but Bess’s unreleased tension has a different target.
| 96 | 3 | "Long Distance Runaround" | Jerry London | Rick Copp & David A. Goodman | August 2, 1995 |
Eddie moves to Los Angeles, leaving Martin lonely.
| 97 | 4 | "Significant Author" | Michael McKean | Victor Levin | August 9, 1995 |
Gibby offers his editors an increased annual bonus which would be given just to one of the editors and will be deducted from the salaries of others. Toby puts up a personal ad, to which a famous writer, Maddox March (Ray Wise), responds.
| 98 | 5 | "9½ Days" | Nick Marck | Andrew Gordon & Eileen Conn | August 16, 1995 |
Once more, Martin begins a relationship with an author of his, Phoebe (Barbara Alyn Woods), who is into all sorts of sexually challenging games. Phoebe is also an etiquette expert — but what exactly is the etiquette after a threesome?
| 99 | 6 | "Beam Me Up, Dr Spock" | Iris Dugow | Bill Prady | August 23, 1995 |
Jeremy gets a bad grade in math, gets a tutor 8 years his senior (Liz Vassey) and quickly starts dating her, which puts Martin’s and Judith’s diverging parenting approaches to a challenge.
| 100 | 7 | "Take Two Tablets, And Get Me To Mount Sinai" | John Landis | Story by : Stephen Engel; Teleplay by : Stephen Engel, Tom Maxwell & Don Woodard | August 30, 1995 |
An episode based mainly on clips from earlier episodes. Martin chokes on a champagne cork and is being evaluated according to the Ten Commandments in order to decide where his final destination will be.
| 101 | 8 | "Music In My Veins, Part I" | Robert Ginty | Stephen Engel | September 13, 1995 |
Martin starts dating a rock star (Shannon Kenny) who is addicted not only to sex and rock‘n’roll…
| 102 | 9 | "Music In My Veins, Part II" | Robert Ginty | Stephen Engel | September 20, 1995 |
Struck by writer’s block, Katrina (Shannon Kenny) discovers some old poems of Martin’s and wants to use them as the lyrics for her band’s new album.
| 103 | 10 | "Tie Me Sister Lu Down, Sport" | Ron Wolotzky | Tom Maxwell & Don Woodard | September 27, 1995 |
In order to prove he has what it takes to become vice president of Whitestone, Martin has to show Gibby’s sister from Australia’s Outback (Morwenna Banks) around New York.
| 104 | 11 | "She Won't Do It, But Her Sister Will" | John Landis | Tom Maxwell & Don Woodard | October 4, 1995 |
Martin starts seeing Judith’s younger sister Winnie (Andrea Parker) and has trouble telling Judith.
| 105 | 12 | "Flight of the Pedalbee" | William Malone | Ellen Idelson & Rob Lottersten | October 11, 1995 |
Martin becomes involved with a self-help guru (Mary Crosby) whose book he is editing. He is only convinced of her methods when it comes to sex though…
| 106 | 13 | "Am I Blue" | John Landis | David Kohan & Max Mutchnick | October 18, 1995 |
Short of money for a down payment to buy his flat, Martin starts a secret career as a successful porn screenwriter.
| 107 | 14 | "Home Is Where The Cart Is" | Ron Wolotzky | Story by : Tammy Ader; Teleplay by : Julie Sherman | November 1, 1995 |
Martin falls in love with Lisbett (Stacy Travis) who lives in her car.
| 108 | 15 | "Little Orphan Eddie" | John Landis | Christopher Vane | November 8, 1995 |
The surprise party Martin sets up for Eddie certainly is full of surprises.
| 109 | 16 | "Toby’s Choice" | Ron Wolotzky | Stephen Engel | November 15, 1995 |
To get rid of his annoying old friend Pete (Curtis Armstrong), Martin sets him up with Toby.
| 110 | 17 | "The Weekend At The College Didn’t Turn Out Like They Planned" | Ron Wolotzky | Jeff Greenstein & Jeff Strauss | November 22, 1995 |
When Judith and Martin accompany Jeremy to visit the college he wants to enrol at, their relationship takes an unexpected turn.
| 111 | 18 | "Second Time Aground" | Rina Sternfeld Allon | Tom Maxwell & Don Woodard | January 24, 1996 |
Judith talks Martin into group counselling for divorced couples who are back together.
| 112 | 19 | "The Spirit Of 76th & Park" | John Landis | Elin Hampton & David Fury | January 31, 1996 |
Martin moves in at Judith’s but has some trouble getting used to her late husband Richard Stone’s computer-controlled appliances.
| 113 | 20 | "All About Louie" | Michael McKean | Christopher Vane | February 7, 1996 |
When Gibby tells Martin to organise the Whitestone stand at the Chicago Book Fair, Toby hires her cousin Louie (Jon Polito) to assist him.
| 114 | 21 | "The Way We War" | Scott White | Rob Lotterstein & Ellen Idelson | February 14, 1996 |
Old conflicts resurface when Judith and Eddie fight about who will organise Martin’s birthday party
| 115 | 22 | "Springtime For Tupper" | Michael Amundson | Tom Maxwell & Don Woodard | February 21, 1996 |
Martin gets his own quality-literature division at Whitestone.
| 116 | 23 | "Hey Diddle Diddle" | Betty Thomas | Stephen Engel | February 28, 1996 |
When Judith catches Martin masturbating, it leads to a talk about their sex life. And action.
| 117 | 24 | "Cupid Is As Cupid Does" | Rina Sternfeld Allon | David Kohan & Max Mutchnick | March 6, 1996 |
Martin sets up Eddie with Judith’s friend Rema (Dawnn Lewis).
| 118 | 25 | "Tenants, Anyone?" | Mary Kay Place | Bill Prady | March 13, 1996 |
Martin quickly regrets renting out his flat to Toby.
| 119 | 26 | "Finale — Part One" | Ron Wolotzky | Stephen Engel | March 20, 1996 |
As Eddie’s best man, Martin starts asking himself whether he should re-marry Judith.
| 120 | 27 | "Finale With A Vengeance" | Ron Wolotzky | Stephen Engel | March 27, 1996 |
On the verge of Judith and Martin’s wedding, plans to revive her late husband Richard Stone surface.
