= Yvette Nicole Brown =

American actress (born 1971)

- Brown in 2026
- Born: August 12, 1971 (age 55); East Cleveland, Ohio, U.S.
- Education: University of Akron
- Occupation: Actress
- Years active: 1992–present
- Spouse: Anthony Davis (m. 2024)
- Website: actressyvettenicolebrown.com

Yvette Nicole Brown (born August 12, 1971) is an American actress, producer, writer, and host. She starred as Shirley Bennett on the NBC and Yahoo Screen sitcom Community, as Dani in the 2015 reboot of The Odd Couple on CBS, and as Dina Rose on the ABC sitcom The Mayor. Brown had a recurring role as Helen Dubois in Drake & Josh, and has had guest roles in television shows such as That '70s Show, The Office, Boston Legal, Chuck, The Soul Man, Mom, and Big Shot. In 2021, she received a Primetime Emmy Award nomination for her role in A Black Lady Sketch Show.

In addition to television, she has had supporting roles in films such as (500) Days of Summer, Tropic Thunder, Repo Men, Percy Jackson: Sea of Monsters, and Avengers: Endgame. She voiced Harper in the video game Minecraft: Story Mode in addition to Cookie on Pound Puppies, Luna on Elena of Avalor, Principal Amanda Waller on DC Super Hero Girls, and Coach Roberts in Inside Out 2. She has hosted Syfy cosplay series Cosplay Melee and has been a frequent couch guest on Talking Dead. She has served as a guest co-host on talk shows including The View, The Talk, and The Real.

== Early life ==
Yvette Nicole Brown was born on August 12, 1971, in East Cleveland, Ohio. She graduated from Warrensville Heights High School in 1989. Brown studied communication studies at the University of Akron and graduated with her Bachelor of Arts in communication in 1994. While at Akron, she was selected for initiation into Omicron Delta Kappa, the National Leadership Honors Society. She was initiated into the University of Akron's Delta Pi chapter of Alpha Kappa Alpha sorority on May 2, 1993.

After graduating, Brown took acting classes in Hollywood, Los Angeles.

== Career ==
In 1992, Brown appeared as "Yvette" in the music video "1-4-All-4-1" by the East Coast Family, a Michael Bivins project, for Biv10 Records. Brown said of the experience, "It was a great run, but I guess music was just never meant to be for me."

Brown first appeared on commercials before entering television shows and films a few years later. She has since played roles on television shows such as The War at Home, Girlfriends, Malcolm in the Middle, That's So Raven, Half & Half, and the American version of The Office. She had a recurring role as theater manager Helen Dubois in the Nickelodeon sitcom Drake & Josh. Frances Callier replaced Brown as Helen for one episode. Brown reprised the role in the Victorious episode "Helen Back Again". She provided the voice of Cookie on The Hub's Pound Puppies.

In 2009, Brown began starring as Shirley Bennett on the comedy series Community. On September 30, 2014, Brown announced that she would be leaving the show after five seasons in order to take care of her ailing father. In her announcement she said, "My dad needs daily care and he needs me. The idea of being away 16 hours a day for five months, I couldn't do it. It was a difficult decision for me to make, but I had to choose my dad."

She has appeared in television commercials for Hamburger Helper, Big Lots, Pine-Sol, Comcast, Aquapod, Shout, Fiber One, Yoplait Yogurt, DiGiorno Pizza, Dairy Queen, and Time Warner. She has appeared on episodes of The Thrilling Adventure Hour as "The Troubleshooter" in the Sparks Nevada, Marshall on Mars series.

In 2012, Brown appeared as a celebrity contestant on GSN's The Pyramid with her Community co-star Danny Pudi.

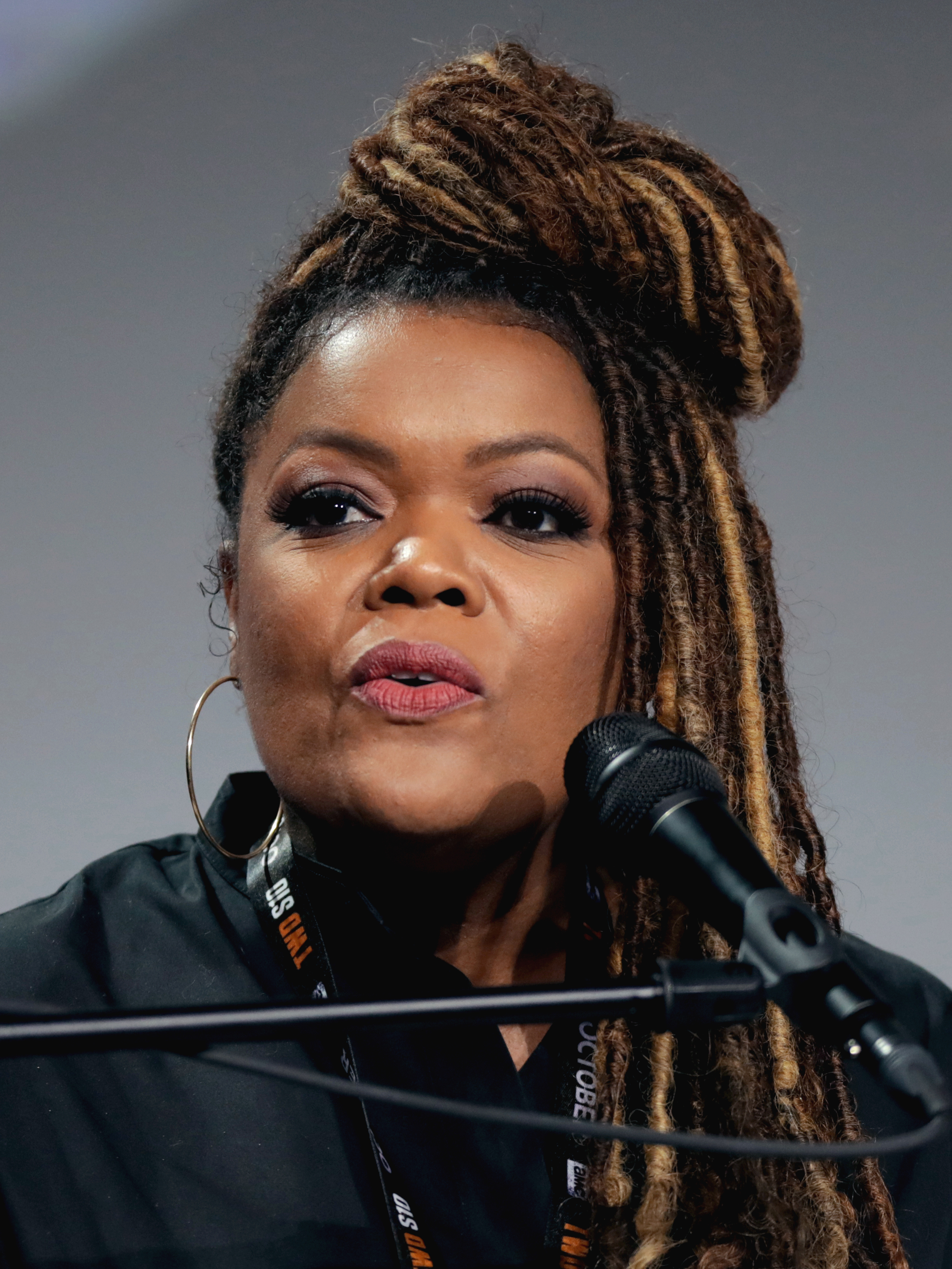
Brown at San Diego Comic-Con in July 2019

In 2014, it was reported that Brown was set to recur on the USA Network series Benched. Shortly after her exit of Community, Brown's role of Dani on the CBS sitcom The Odd Couple was upgraded to series regular. She has been a regular guest on AMC's Talking Dead. She hosts Syfy cosplay series Cosplay Melee. Entertainment Weekly named her one of the 19th Best Guest Stars on 7th Heaven.

In July 2018, Brown temporarily replaced Chris Hardwick as the host of Talking Dead and served as moderator for The Walking Dead and Fear the Walking Dead panels at San Diego Comic-Con during Hardwick's suspension.

Brown has had a recurring role as Judge Anita Harper on the HBO series A Black Lady Sketch Show which earned her a nomination for the Primetime Emmy Award for Outstanding Guest Actress in a Comedy Series. In 2019, Brown wrote the independent romantic comedy feature Always a Bridesmaid.

In 2020, Brown was a guest panelist in season three of The Masked Singer. She later competed in season twelve as "Showbird" with recurring panelist Joel McHale as her Mask Ambassador. Brown was eliminated on "Footloose Night".

In 2023, Brown voiced KRS, a robotic assistant, and recurring character in My Dad the Bounty Hunter.

== Personal life ==
Brown was inducted into Warrensville Heights High School's hall of fame in 2009. Brown served on the SAG-AFTRA 2019–2021 National Board.

In December 2023, Brown announced her engagement to actor Anthony Davis. They were married on December 14, 2024, in Los Angeles, California.

=== Politics ===
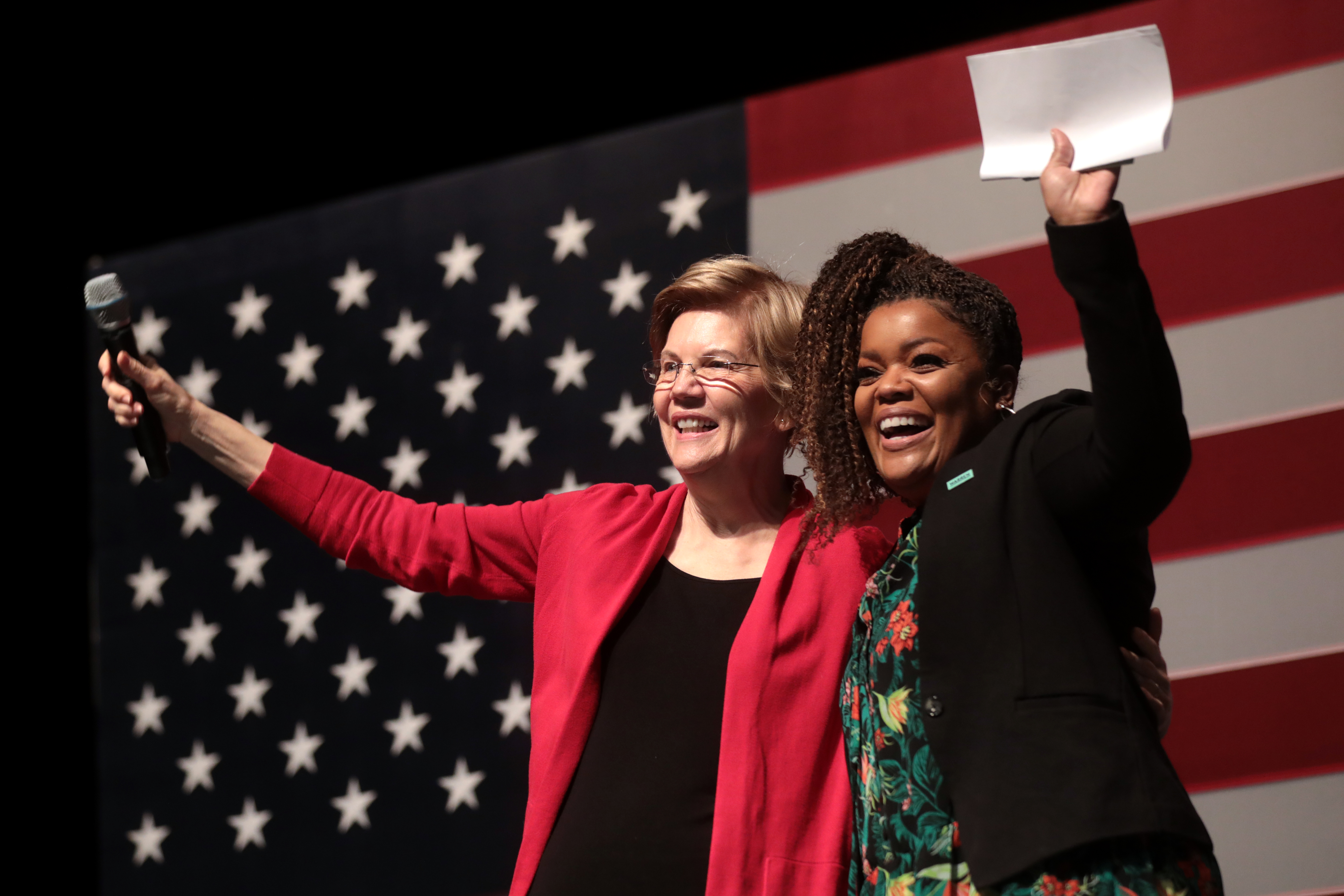
Brown (right) campaigning with Elizabeth Warren

Brown endorsed and campaigned for Elizabeth Warren in the 2020 Democratic Party presidential primaries.

During the 2020 general election, Brown, along with several of her Community castmates, made a campaign video in support of Joe Biden, entitled "Human Beings For Biden."

In 2022, Brown worked with VoteRiders on a campaign to help educate people about local voter ID requirements so that eligible voters would not be turned away at the polls.

During the 2026 Los Angeles mayoral election, Brown endorsed Karen Bass's re-election and campaigned alongside Bass.

== Filmography ==
=== Film ===
Year	Title	Role	Notes
2000	His Woman, His Wife	Renee	Video
2003	180 Miles Away	Other Woman	Short
2004	Little Black Book	Production Assistant	
2005	The Island	Harvest Nurse	
2005	The Kid & I	Bunny	
2006	Dreamgirls	Curtis' Secretary	
2007	The Neighbor	Nurse	
2008	Meet Dave	Old Navy Saleswoman	
2008	Tropic Thunder	Peck's Assistant – Peck's Office	
2009	Hotel for Dogs	Ms. Camwell	
2009	500 Days of Summer	New Secretary	
2009	The Ugly Truth	Dori Coleman	
2009	N.C.B.S	Flashback Wife	Short
2010	Repo Men	Rhodesia	
2012	Community: Abed's Master Key	Shirley Bennett (voice)	Short
2013	Percy Jackson: Sea of Monsters	Gray Sister Anger	
2013	Community: Miracle on Jeff's Street	Shirley Bennett (voice)	Short
2014	Yellowbird	Ladybug (voice)	
2015	Don't Be a Drip	Store Clerk	Short
2016	Cuddle Party	Allison	Short
2016	DC Super Hero Girls: Super Hero High	Amanda Waller (voice)	Video
2016	DC Super Hero Girls: Hero of the Year	Amanda Waller (voice)	Video
2017	Lemonade Mafia	Kendra Anderson	Short
2017	DC Super Hero Girls: Intergalactic Games	Amanda Waller (voice)	Video
2017	Lego DC Super Hero Girls: Brain Drain	Amanda Waller (voice)	Video
2017	Smartass	Officer Neesy	
2018	Lego DC Super Hero Girls: Super-Villain High	Amanda Waller (voice)	Video
2018	Lego Marvel Super Heroes – Black Panther: Trouble in Wakanda	Okoye (voice)	Short
2018	DC Super Hero Girls: Legends of Atlantis	Amanda Waller (voice)	Video
2018	The Last Days of TJ Staggs	Executive	Short
2019	Avengers: Endgame	Phyllis Jenkins, S.H.I.E.L.D Agent	Cameo
2019	Always a Bridesmaid	Pastor Althea Brody	
2019	Lady and the Tramp	Aunt Sarah	
2021	Broken Diamonds	Cookie	
2021	Muppets Haunted Mansion	The Driver	Video
2021	Beebo Saves Christmas	Turbo (voice)	Video
2022	DC League of Super-Pets	Patty (voice)	
2022	Naked Mole Rat Gets Dressed	Grande (voice)	Video
2022	Lego Star Wars: Summer Vacation	Colvett Valeria (voice)	Video
2022	Disenchanted	Rosaleen	
2023	Wish	Porcupine (voice)	Uncredited
2024	Inside Out 2	Coach Roberts (voice)	
2024	K-Pops!	Brenda	
2025	Code 3	Shanice	
2025	Zootopia 2	Bearoness Bear/EMT Otter (voice)	Cameos
2026	Hexed †	TBA (voice)	

=== Television ===
Year	Title	Role	Notes
2002	For the People	Server	Episode: "Lonely Hearts"
2002	Do Over	Woman	Episode: "Investing in the Future"
2003	Girlfriends	Sherri Childs	Recurring cast (season 3)
2004	Curb Your Enthusiasm	Stewardess	Episode: "Opening Night"
2004	The Big House	Eartha Cleveland	Main cast
2004	Two and a Half Men	Mandy	Episode: "Just Like Buffalo"
2004	7th Heaven	Leah Morris	Episode: "Gratitude"
2004–07	Drake & Josh	Helen Dubois	Recurring cast (season 2–4)
2005	Fat Actress	Woman in Restaurant	Episode: "Big Butts"
2005	That's So Raven	Monica	Episode: "Too Much Pressure"
2005	That '70s Show	Sgt. Davis	Episode: "You're My Best Friend"
2005	Hot Properties	Oprah-Head	Episode: "Waiting for Oprah"
2006	Malcolm in the Middle	Female Security Agent #2	Episode: "Bride of Ida"
2006	House	Ellen Stambler	Episode: "Sex Kills"
2006	The War at Home	Airport Security	Episode: "The West Palm Beach Story"
2006	Half & Half	Ceci	Recurring cast (season 4)
2006	Pepper Dennis	Angela Howell	Episode: "Pepper Dennis Behind Bars"
2006	Sleeper Cell	Fatima	Recurring cast (season 2)
2007	The Office	Paris	Episode: "The Return"
2007	The Loop	Agent Isabelle	Episode: "Yeah, Presents"
2007	American Body Shop	Ms. Durant	Episode: "Pilot"
2007	Entourage	Daily Variety Agent	Episode: "Gary's Desk"
2007	Boston Legal	Doris Thumper	Recurring cast (season 4)
2008	'Til Death	Roxie	Episode: "Raisinette in the Sun"
2008	Privileged	Pam	Episode: "All About the Haves and the Have-Nots"
2008	Merry Christmas, Drake & Josh	Helen Dubois	Television film
2009	Kath & Kim	Clerk #1	Episode: "Competition"
2009	True Jackson, VP	Coral Barns	Episode: "Company Retreat"
2009	Rules of Engagement	Mrs. Alberts	Episode: "Voluntary Commitment"
2009	Roommates	Madam Saphire	Episode: "The Tarot"
2009	iCarly	Art Student	Episode: "iMust Have Locker 239"
2009	Sherri	Church Lady	Episode: "There Is No 'I' in Church"
2009–15	Community	Shirley Bennett	Main cast (season 1–5), guest (season 6)
2010–13	Pound Puppies	Cookie, additional voices (voice)	Main cast
2011	Life After	Herself	Episode: "Kim Coles: Life After 'Living Single'"
2011	Bandwagon: The Series	Yvette	Recurring cast (season 2)
2011	Victorious	Helen Dubois	Episode: "Helen Back Again"
2011	CollegeHumor Originals	Shirley Bennett	Episode: "Save Greendale"
2011	Chuck	Buy More Employee	Episode: "Chuck Versus the Hack Off"
2011–21	Family Guy	Additional voices	Recurring guest
2012	Pyramid	Herself/Celebrity Contestant	Recurring guest
2012–16	The Soul Man	Robyn	Guest cast (season 1–3 & 5)
2012–18	Match Game	Herself/Celebrity Panelist	Recurring guest
2012–21	Talking Dead	Herself	Recurring guest
2013	The Jeff Probst Show	Herself/Co-Host	Main Co-Host
2013	Deal with It	Herself	Episode: "RC Chaos in Hotel"
2013	Shake It Up	Madame Tiffany	Episode: "Psych It Up"
2013	Once Upon a Time	Ursula (voice)	Episode: "Ariel"
2013–20	Hollywood Game Night	Herself/Celebrity Player	Recurring guest
2014	Psych	Hazel Lazarus	Episode: "A Touch of Sweevil"
2014	Melissa & Joey	Calista	Episode: "I'll Cut You"
2014	BoJack Horseman	Beyoncé, Pedestrian (voice)	Episode: "Our A-Story is a 'D' Story"
2014	Benched	Donna	Episode: "Brief Encounters"
2014	Stan Lee's Mighty 7	Yuka (voice)	Television film
2014–17	Celebrity Name Game	Herself/Celebrity Player	Recurring guest
2015	Hot in Cleveland	Lily	Episode: "Cleveland Calendar Girls"
2015	Harvey Beaks	M.O.M. (voice)	Episode: "Randl's Scandl"
2015	Last Man Standing	Movie-Goer	Episode: "Free Range Parents"
2015	Game Shakers	Helen	Episode: "Tiny Pickles"
2015–17	The Odd Couple	Danielle "Dani" Duncan	Main cast
2015–18	DC Super Hero Girls	Amanda Waller, Bumblebee's Mom (voice)	Main cast
2016	It's Not You, It's Men	Herself	Episode: "Modern Romance"
2016	First Impressions with Dana Carvey	Herself	Episode: "Yvette Nicole Brown"
2016	Whose Line Is It Anyway?	Herself	Episode: "Yvette Nicole Brown"
2016	Cupcake Wars	Herself/Contestant	Episode: "Celebrity: Medieval Cupcakes"
2016	To Tell the Truth	Herself/Panelist	Episode: "Yvette Nicole Brown"
2016	Rizzoli & Isles	U.S. Postal Inspector CJ Prescott	Episode: "Post Mortem"
2016	Star vs. the Forces of Evil	Brigid (voice)	Episode: "Star vs. Echo Creek"
2016–20	Elena of Avalor	Luna (voice)	Recurring cast
2016–23	The $100,000 Pyramid	Herself/Celebrity Player	Recurring guest
2017	Cosplay Melee	Herself/Host	Main host
2017	Celebrity Family Feud	Herself	Episode: "Eva Longoria vs. George Lopez and Yvette Nicole Brown vs. Ashley Graham"
2017	Regular Show	The Seer (voice)	Episode: "Meet The Seer"
2017	Dr. Ken	Amy	Episode: "A Day In The Life"
2017	The New Edition Story	Shirley Bivins	Main cast
2017	The Tom and Jerry Show	Momma Mockingbird (voice)	Episode: "To Kill A Mockingbird"
2017	Lego DC Super Hero Girls	Amanda Waller (voice)	Recurring cast
2017	Be Cool, Scooby-Doo!	Judge Connie Monroe (voice)	Episode: "The People vs. Fred Jones"
2017	Penn Zero: Part-Time Hero	Boat Maria (voice)	Recurring cast (season 2)
2017	Bunnicula	Mrs. Varney (voice)	Episode: "Lucky Vampire's Foot"
2017	Lego Star Wars: The Freemaker Adventures	Lieutenant Valeria (voice)	Recurring cast (season 2)
2017	Ryan Hansen Solves Crimes on Television	Captain Jackson #7	Episode: "Freezed"
2017–18	The Mayor	Dina Rose	Main cast
2017–18	Stretch Armstrong and the Flex Fighters	Quick Charge/Sarah Kamen (voice)	2 episodes
2017–18	Puppy Dog Pals	Daisy (voice)	Recurring cast (season 1), guest (season 2)
2017–19	SuperMansion	Portia Jones/Zenith (voice)	Main cast (season 1), recurring cast (season 2)
2018	To Tell the Truth	Herself/Panelist	Episode: "Yvette Nicole Brown, Laverne Cox, Tony Hale, Jalen Rose"
2018	Sofia the First	Sugar Plum Fairy (voice)	Episode: "The Mystic Isles: Undercover Fairies"
2018	Unsolved	Lois	Episode: "Tupac Amaru Shakur"
2018	Lego Star Wars: All-Stars	Lieutenant Valeria (voice)	Episode: "From Trenches to Wrenches: The Roger Story"
2018–19	Mom	Nora Rogers	Recurring cast (season 5-6)
2018–20	New Looney Tunes	Rhoda Roundhouse (voice)	Recurring cast (season 2–3)
2019	RuPaul's Drag Race All Stars	Herself/Guest Judge	Episode: "Roast in Peace"
2019	Critical Role	Herself	Episode: "The Favor"
2019	Weird City	Glail	Episode: "Below"
2019	What Just Happened??! with Fred Savage	Herself	Episode: "Family"
2019	Dear White People	Evelyn Conners	Episode: "Volume 3: Chapter V"
2019–24	The Loud House	Mayor Davis (voice)	Recurring cast (season 3–9)
2019–23	A Black Lady Sketch Show	Judge Anita Harper	Recurring cast
2020	The Masked Singer	Herself/Guest Panelist for Season 3	Episode: "The Mother Of All Final Face Offs, Part 1"
2020	The Big Fib	Herself/Host	Main host
2020	Gentefied	Doctor Macer	Episode: "Delfina"
2020	Will & Grace	Ru	Episode: "New Crib"
2020	The Rocketeer	Chantel D'Avio (voice)	Recurring cast
2020	Spider-Man	Head Administrator (voice)	Episode: "Spider-Man Unmasked"
2020	T.O.T.S.	Cora Beakman (voice)	Episode: "The Ring Bear/Bull of Energy"
2020	It's Pony	Teacher (voice)	Recurring cast (season 1)
2020–21	Crossing Swords	Sgt. Meghan (voice)	Recurring cast
2020–22	I Can See Your Voice	Herself/Panelist	Recurring guest
2021	Earth to Ned	Herself	Episode: "Trancendental Neditation"
2021	Celebrity Wheel of Fortune	Herself/Celebrity Contestant	Episode: "Constance Zimmer, Maria Menounos & Yvette Nicole Brown"
2021	Nickelodeon's Unfiltered	Herself	Episode: "As Seen On Burrito"
2021	The Real Housewives of Atlanta	Herself	Episode: "A Whole Lot of Mess"
2021	Celebrity Game Face	Herself/Contestant	Episode: "Go Biggs or Go Home"
2021	The Real Housewives of Potomac	Herself	Episode: "Secrets Revealed"
2021	Disney's Holiday Magic Quest	Herself/Host	Main host
2021	Call Me Kat	Marlene	Episode: "Business Council"
2021	Ridley Jones	Thoebe the Sphinx (voice)	Episode: "Ridley's Babysitter Club/Riddle Me This"
2021–22	The Chicken Squad	Captain Tully (voice)	Main cast
2021–22	Fairfax	Trini (voice)	Recurring cast
2021–22	American Dad!	Additional Voices (voice)	Recurring guest
2021–22	Big Shot	Sherilyn Thomas	Main cast
2021–22	Central Park	Gina Tracker (voice)	Recurring cast (season 2–3)
2021–23	The Ghost and Molly McGee	Dianne (voice)	Guest (season 1), recurring cast (season 2)
2022	Art Directors Guild Awards	Herself/Host	Main host
2022	American Rescue Dog Show	Herself/Judge	Main judge
2022	Disney Summer Magic Quest	Herself/Host	Main host
2022	Password	Herself	Episode: "Yvette Nicole Brown, Joel McHale, Chrissy Metz & Jimmy Fallon"
2022	Dogs in Space	Clawdia (voice)	Episode: "Barking Up the Wrong Tree"
2022	Home Economics	Donna	Episode: "Mickey Ears, $19.99"
2022	The Walking Dead	Commonwealth Soldier (voice)	Episode: "Outpost 22"
2022	Slumberkins	Yak Mom (voice)	Recurring cast
2022–23	Firebuds	Chief Faye Fireson (voice)	Recurring cast
2022–23	Alice's Wonderland Bakery	Mama Rabbit (voice)	Recurring cast (season 1), guest (season 2)
2023	Annual Art Directors Guild Awards	Herself/Host	Main host
2023	Mickey Mouse Funhouse	Pepper Lemon (voice)	2 episodes
2023	General Hospital	Nurse	Episode #1.15251
2023	Rugrats	Miss Mellie/Narrator (voice)	Episode: "Tot Springs Showdown"
2023	Frog and Toad	Rabbit (voice)	Main cast
2023	Act Your Age	Angela Martin	Main cast
2023	Strange Planet	Lifegiver (voice)	Episode: "The Big Wet"
2023	My Dad the Bounty Hunter	KRS (voice)	Recurring cast
2023	Krapopolis	Herophile (voice)	Episode: "Wife Swamp"
2023	Shape Island	Herself/Narrator (voice)	Main narrator
2023–24	Pupstruction	Mayor Gilmore (voice)	Recurring cast
2024	Good Times: Black Again	Beverly Evans (voice)	Main cast
2024	The Masked Singer	Herself/Showbird	Season 12 contestant
2024	Frasier	Monica	Episode: "My Brilliant Sister"
2025	Celebrity Jeopardy!	Herself (Contestant)	
2025	The Family Business: New Orleans	Monique Duncan	Series regular
2025	Gremlins	Mayor Hanson (voice)	2 episodes
2025	Suits LA	Herself	
2025	Matlock	Nadine	Episode: "Tomorrow Is Still Tomorrow"
2025	He Wasn't Man Enough	Candy	Television film
2026	Sofia the First: Royal Magic	Lady Saddlespur (voice)	Recurring role
2026	Among Us	Orange (voice)	
2026	Criminal Minds	Sheila Watkins	Guest role; season 19
2026	Adults	Anton's mother (voice)	Episode: "Talia"
2026	Hollywood Arts	Helen Dubois	Recurring Role

=== Video games ===
Year	Title	Voice role
2011	Family Guy: Back to the Multiverse	Additional Voices
2016	Minecraft: Story Mode	Harper
2018	Lego DC Super-Villains	Amanda Waller

=== Podcasts ===
Year	Title	Voice role	Notes
2020	Listen Out Loud Podcast	Mayor Davis (voice)	Episode: "Pet Adoption Day with Lana Loud"
2021	Dark Air with Terry Carnation	Dr. Lizzie (voice)	Main cast

== Awards and nominations ==
Year	Organisation	Category	Project	Result	Ref.
2025	Children's and Family Emmy Awards	Outstanding Children's Personality	Cookie Monster's Bake Sale: Block Party	Nominated	
