= Danny (TV series) =

2001 American television sitcom

- Genre: Sitcom
- Created by: Daniel Stern
- Written by: Daniel Stern; Bob Nickman; Alan J. Zipper
- Directed by: Timothy Busfield; Peter Lauer; Lev L. Spiro
- Starring: Daniel Stern; Julia McIlvaine; Jon Foster; Roz Ryan; Robert Prosky; Vincent J. Burns; Joely Fisher; Mia Korf
- Composer: Danny Pelfrey
- Country of origin: United States
- Original language: English
- No. of seasons: 1
- No. of episodes: 9 (7 unaired)

Production
- Executive producers: Michael Hanel; Ellen Idelson; Rob Lotterstein; Howard J. Morris; Mindy Schultheis; Daniel Stern
- Producers: Gigi Coello-Bannon; Ari Posner; John Whitman; Allen J. Zipper
- Camera setup: Film; Single-camera
- Running time: 30 minutes
- Production companies: Johnny Bongos Productions; Acme Productions; Big Ticket Television

Original release
- Network: CBS
- Release: September 28 – October 5, 2001

Danny is an American television sitcom that aired on CBS. The series was created, executive produced and starred Daniel Stern. It was one of the last comedies to air on CBS's Friday night lineup airing along with The Ellen Show which premiered at the same time. The series premiered on September 28, 2001, and was abruptly canceled after two episodes were aired, making it the first series of the 2001 U.S. television season to be canceled.

== Premise ==
Danny is a recently separated father struggling to raise his two teenage kids. Despite just turning 40, he still wants to pursue his lifelong dreams all while running the town's local community center.

== Cast ==
- Daniel Stern as Danny
- Julia McIlvaine as Sally
- Jon Foster as Henry
- Roz Ryan as Chickie
- Robert Prosky as Lenny
- Vincent J. Burns as Vince
- Joely Fisher as Molly
- Mia Korf as Rachel

== Episodes ==
The first two episodes of the series were directed by Peter Lauer.

No.	Title	Directed by	Written by	Original release date	Prod. code
1	"Pilot"	Peter Lauer	Daniel Stern	September 28, 2001	62554-001
2	"Donuts and Beer"	Peter Lauer	Bob Nickman	October 5, 2001	62554-002
3	"The Dress Mess"	N/A	N/A	Unaired	TBA
4	"Forget About Your Boss"	N/A	Allen J. Zipper	Unaired	TBA
5	"Danny's Night Out"	N/A	N/A	Unaired	TBA
6	"Algebra I"	TBD	TBD	Unaired	TBA
7	"The Trojan Wife"	TBD	TBD	Unaired	TBA
8	"The Kid Stays in the Picture"	TBD	TBD	Unaired	TBA
9	"Daughters and Pigs"	TBD	TBD	Unaired	TBA
