= Cosplay Melee =

American reality television show

- Genre: Reality television; Cosplay
- Judges: Yvette Nicole Brown; LeeAnna Vamp; Christian Beckman
- Country of origin: United States
- Original language: English
- No. of seasons: 1
- No. of episodes: 6

Production
- Executive producers: Jay Peterson; Todd Lubin
- Running time: 42 minutes
- Production company: Matador Content

Original release
- Network: Syfy
- Release: March 21 – April 25, 2017

Cosplay Melee is a Syfy channel reality television show executive produced by Jay Peterson and Todd Lubin, which was announced in February 2017 and premiered its first season of six episodes on March 21, 2017. The series is hosted by Yvette Nicole Brown, and follows cosplayers as they put their skills to the test. Cosplay Melee is Syfy's second cosplay-competition series, after the two-season series Heroes of Cosplay in 2013.

== Premise ==
The series is hosted by Yvette Nicole Brown, and follows four cosplayers each week as they put their skills to the test as they create innovative cosplays, having to not only create the costume, but also act the part of the character for a realistic performance. Guiding and critiquing the contestants are international cosplayer LeeAnna Vamp, and Christian Beckman, the costume creator for The Hunger Games and Tron: Legacy. At the end of every episode each week, the winner of that particular competition is awarded with $10,000.

== Contestants ==
In each episode, there are two rounds. The first requires the contestants to make a small test piece, and one is eliminated and one receives a bonus for the second round, where they create their full characters, and a contestant is selected as the winner of the episode.

| # | Name | Occupation | Cosplay source | Result |
|---|---|---|---|---|
| 1 | Alicia Bellamy | Costume Designer | Chronicles of Riddick | Eliminated |
| 1 | Xavier Conley | Chef and Prop Builder | Star Wars | Won both rounds |
| 1 | Grace Herbert | Police Officer | Guardians of the Galaxy | |
| 1 | Fred Reed | Miniatures Painter | Star Trek | |
| 2 | Edgar Mayoral | Blacksmith | N/A | Eliminated |
| 2 | Jennifer Rose | Professional cosplayer | Baratheon | |
| 2 | Emily Schmidt | Assisted living activities director | Wildling | Won both rounds |
| 2 | Ruth Stetson | Professional cosplayer | White Walker | |
| 3 | Garrick Backer | Professional cosplayer | Demon | |
| 3 | Marty LeGrow | Children's entertainer | Angel | |
| 3 | Lisa Rosenberg | Professional cosplayer | Demon | Won both rounds |
| 3 | Jesseca Thaxton | Fashion designer | Angel | Eliminated |
| 4 | Joshua Brown | Professional cosplayer | Fallout | Won first round |
| 4 | Caitlyn Culpepper | Small boutique | Overwatch | Eliminated |
| 4 | Becka Noel | Costume designer | Star Trek Online | |
| 4 | Steven Smith | Prop maker | Destiny | Won second round |
| 5 | Aaron Bowholtz | Tattoo artist | Ancient Egypt | |
| 5 | Tuwanda Chandler | Seamstress | Peace, love, positivity | Eliminated |
| 5 | James Fipps | Graphic designer | Vigilante guardian | Won first round |
| 5 | Dhareza Maramis | Creative director | Military, cats | Won second round |
| 6 | Paul Esquer | Prop maker | .hack | Won first round |
| 6 | Jacqueline Goehner | Professional cosplayer | Record of Lodoss War | Won second round |
| 6 | Meesha LeDoux | Veterinarian assistant | Monster Girl series | Eliminated |
| 6 | Jessie Pridemore | Professional seamstress | Mahou Shoujo Madoka Magica | |

== Episodes ==
| No. | Title | Cosplay Theme | Original release date | US viewers (millions) |
|---|---|---|---|---|
| 1 | "A Night at the Space Opera" | Space opera | March 21, 2017 | 0.521 |
Themes: Alicia: Chronicles of Riddick. Xavier: Star Wars. Grace: Guardians of the Galaxy. Fred: Star Trek.; Round 1: Alicia: headpiece. Xavier: X-Wing pilot helmet. Grace: helmet, goggles and respirator: Fred: helmet, respirator and visor. Eliminated: Alicia. Winner: Xavier.; Round 2: Xavier: Crime Lord. Grace: Bounty Hunter. Fred: Militant Dictator. Winner: Xavier.
| 2 | "Throne Off" | Game of Thrones | March 28, 2017 | 0.532 |
Themes: Edgar: Wildling. Jennifer: Elvish. Emily: Stark. Ruth: Targaryen rival.; Round 1: Edgar: Sword. Jennifer: Crossbow. Emily: Flail. Ruth: Shield. Eliminated: Edgar. Winner: Emily.; Round 2: Jennifer: Baratheon. Emily: Wildling. Ruth: White Walker. Winner: Emily.
| 3 | "Angels and Demons" | Angelic and devilish characters | April 4, 2017 | 0.449 |
Themes: Garrick: Demon. Marty: Angel. Lisa: Demon. Jesseca: Angel.; Round 1: Garrick: Metal wings. Marty: Wings made of the Bible. Lisa: Angel of pestilence wings. Jesseca: stone wings. Eliminated: Jesseca. Winner: Lisa.; Round 2: Garrick: Former angel banished from heaven. Marty: Fallen angel recruited by Lucifer. Lisa: Servant of pestilence, horseman of the apocalypse. Winner: Lisa.
| 4 | "War Games" | High-tech futuristic video games | April 11, 2017 | 0.398 |
Themes: Joshua: Fallout. Caitlyn: Overwatch. Becka: Star Trek Online. Steven: Destiny.; Round 1: Joshua: Multi-weapon arm. Caitlyn: Flamethrower. Becka: "The Genesis", funnels knowledge. Steven: Plasma cannon. Eliminated: Caitlyn. Winner: Joshua.; Round 2: Joshua: Synth reprogrammed by U.S. army. Becka: Creator and destroyer of life. Steven: Warlock necromancer. Winner: Steven.
| 5 | "Superheroes" | Superheroes without superpowers | April 18, 2017 | 0.401 |
Themes: Aaron: Ancient Egypt. Tuwanda: Peace, love, positivity. James: Guardian. Dhareza: Military, cats.; Round 1: Aaron: Gear emblem. Tuwanda: Peace, lightning, heart emblem. James: Shield emblem. Dhareza: Armored cat emblem. Eliminated: Tuwanda. Winner: James.; Round 2: Aaron: Egyptologist turned defender of humanity. James: Ex-con turned crime fighter. Dhareza: Vigilante avenging death of cat. Winner: Dhareza.
| 6 | "Animelee" | Anime | April 25, 2017 | 0.420 |
Themes: Paul: .hack. Jacqueline: Record of Lodoss War. Meesha: Monster Girl series. Jessie: Mahou Shoujo Madoka Magica.; Round 1: Paul: Beetle gauntlet. Jacqueline: Fire flower. Meesha: Dragon skull staff. Jessie: Winged heart wand. Eliminated: Meesha. Winner: Paul.; Round 2: Paul: Delinquent thief, con artist. Jacqueline: Moe fairy, protector of the forest. Jessie: Heroic schoolgirl with magical powers. Winner: Jacqueline.

== Production ==
The series was announced in February 2017 by Heather Olander, the senior Vice President of Syfy.

Christian Beckman, a judge on the series, has done costume work for Tron: Legacy, The Hunger Games, The Last Airbender, Star Trek, Where the Wild Things Are, War of the Worlds and I Am Legend, as well as having been part of the team that created the mechanical arms for Doctor Octopus in Spider-Man 2.

== Broadcast ==
Cosplay Melee premiered its first season of six episodes in the U.S. on March 21, 2017, at 10/9c on Syfy. The series premiered on June 13, 2017, in Canada on Space.
