= Mia Korf =

American actress

- Born: November 1, 1966 (age 59); Ithaca, New York, U.S.
- Education: Ithaca High School; Cornell University; Juilliard School of Music
- Occupation: Actress
- Father: Richard P. Korf

Mia Korf (born November 1, 1966) is an American actress best known for originating the role of Blair Daimler Buchanan in One Life to Live.

== Early life and education ==
Born on November 1, 1966, in Ithaca, New York, Korf is the daughter of mycologist Richard P. Korf and Kumiko ("Kumi"), née Tachibana, a fine artist specializing in printmaking. She attended Ithaca High School and Cornell University, as well as Juilliard School of Music. As for how and when Korf first became interested in acting, despite her entry in 1992's The Soap Opera Book: Who's Who in Daytime Drama, which specifically credits Cornell as the birthplace of her "early affinity for stage work," it is evident that such affinity had developed as least as early as March 1982 (during her junior year at Ithaca High), as witnessed by Ithaca Journal coverage of IHS productions of West Side Story and the 1945 Broadway hit, Dark of the Moon.

== Career ==
Korf began her career in television in 1990 on the NBC series The Days and Nights of Molly Dodd and the soap opera Loving. The following year, she was cast as the original Blair Cramer on the ABC daytime drama, One Life to Live. The character of Blair had many characteristics in common with Korf, including details about her birthplace, horoscope sign (Scorpio) and hobbies. In early 1993, she left the series to appear in the Broadway stage play Face Value, a farcical musical partly based on the controversies of the broadway musical Miss Saigon, but the play closed after six days of previews and never officially opened.

She has since continued to appear in numerous prime-time television series, including: Players, Party of Five, Danny, Becker, NYPD Blue, Chicago Hope, Nip/Tuck, The Agency, North Shore, Hawaii, Crossing Jordan, Strong Medicine, Cold Case, and most recently Eli Stone. She has also appeared in the feature films Blood Brothers and Jerry Maguire. Korf voiced Theresa Cook in W.I.T.C.H., in D is for Dangerous, K is for Knowledge and P is for Protectors.

== Filmography ==
=== Film ===
Year	Title	Role	Notes
1993	Silent Witness: What a Child Saw	Carol Rembrandt	
1996	Jerry Maguire	Former Girlfriend	Uncredited
1999	Anywhere but Here	Josh's Date	Uncredited
2013	Playdate	Yoga Instructor	Direct-to-video

=== Television ===
Year	Title	Role	Notes
1988	Loving	Mei Ling	Episode dated 15 January 1988
1989	Dream Street	Mari	2 episodes
1990	The Days and Nights of Molly Dodd	Dr. Kim Rosenthal	3 episodes
1991	3×3 Eyes	Natsuko	Miniseries; English version
1991–1993	One Life to Live	Blair Daimler Cramer	
1994	Ghostwriter	Sonia Ivey	4 episodes
1994	Sweet Justice	Dr. Shen	Episode: "Story of My Life"
1994	Philly Heat	Fukiko Masaguchi	Television film
1995	Party of Five	Gwen	3 episodes
1995	Tom Clancy's Op Center	Liz Gorman	Television film
1995	Maybe This Time	Brenda	Episode: "Gracie Under Fire"
1995	Under Fire	Ace Whitney	Television film
1996	Nowhere Man	Jane Butler	Episode: "Doppelganger"
1996	Chicago Hope	Valerie Farr	2 episodes
1996	Aaahh!!! Real Monsters	Echnida	Episode: "Who'll Stop the Brain?/Cement Heads"
1996	The Sentinel	Akiko Keno / Angela Kamura	Episode: "Payback"
1997	Color of Justice	Linda Change	Television film
1997–1998	Players	Christine Kowalski	17 episodes
1998	Ask Harriet	Ava	Episode: "Pilot"
1999	The Pretender	Anna	Episode: "Mr. Lee"
1999	Becker	Lorna	Episode: "Shovel Off to Buffalo"
2000–2002	Max Steel	Dragonelle	4 episodes
2000	Time of Your Life	Sophie	2 episodes
2001	Crossing Jordan	Dr. Grace Yakura	Episode: "Pilot"
2001	Danny	Rachel	4 episodes
2002	The Agency	Andrea Chang	2 episodes
2002	Bram & Alice	Gina	2 episodes
2002	Robbery Homicide Division	D. A. Yolanda Lawrence	Episode: "City of Strivers"
2004	NYPD Blue	Lucy Timmons	Episode: "On the Fence"
2004	North Shore	Maya	Episode: "Surprise Party"
2004	Nip/Tuck	Lawyer	Episode: "Rose and Raven Rosenberg"
2004	Hawaii	Dr. Katherine Sakata	Episode: "Hawaiian Justice"
2004	JAG	Captain Patricia Tam	Episode: "Camp Delta"
2005	Strong Medicine	Miko	Episode: "Paternity Test"
2006	W.I.T.C.H.	Theresa Cook	3 episodes
2006	Vanished	Tiersa Adams	3 episodes
2007	Cold Case	Evelyn Takahashi (1942–1945)	Episode: "Family 8108"
2008	Eli Stone	Charissa Nakauchi	Episode: "Waiting for That Day"
2008	Faux Baby	Gigi	Episode: "The Boob Ultimatum"
