= Players (1997 TV series) =

- Genre: Crime drama
- Created by: Reggie Rock Bythewood; Ice-T; Shaun Cassidy; Dick Wolf
- Written by: Randy Anderson; Stan Berkowitz; Alan Cross; Gerry Conway; Ron Lux; Alfonso H. Moreno; Clyde Phillips; Tom Spezialy; Ethlie Ann Vare; Ed Zuckerman
- Starring: Ice-T; Costas Mandylor; Frank John Hughes; Mia Korf
- Theme music composer: Mike Post
- Composers: Ben Decter; Kevin J. Edelman; Dennis McCarthy; Mike Post
- Country of origin: United States
- Original language: English
- No. of seasons: 1
- No. of episodes: 18

Production
- Executive producers: Clyde Phillips; Michael Vittes; Dick Wolf; Ed Zuckerman
- Producers: Randy Anderson; Stan Berkowitz; Arthur W. Forney; Peter R. McIntosh; Patrick McKee; Robert Rabinowitz
- Cinematography: Victor Hammer
- Running time: 60 mins.
- Production companies: Wolf Films; NBC Studios; Universal Television

Original release
- Network: NBC
- Release: October 17, 1997 – April 17, 1998

Players is an American crime drama television series that aired on NBC from October 17, 1997, to April 17, 1998. Co-created by Reggie Rock Bythewood, Dick Wolf and Shaun Cassidy, the series starred Ice-T, Costas Mandylor, Frank John Hughes, and Mia Korf. It was produced by Wolf Films in association with NBC and Universal Television. Players was cancelled after 18 episodes.

== Synopsis ==
The series follows three young ex-cons who, as a part of a new FBI program, are commissioned to track down criminals.

== Cast ==
=== Main ===
- Ice-T as Isaac "Ice" Gregory
- Costas Mandylor as Alphonse Royo
- Frank John Hughes as Charlie O'Bannon
- Mia Korf as Agt. Christine Kowalski

=== Recurring ===
- Bob McCracken as Malcolm O'Conner

== Syndication ==
In 2008, the series began airing on the Sleuth network.

== Episodes ==
No.	Title	Directed by	Written by	Original release date	Prod. code
1	"Con Job"	Donald Petrie	Teleplay by : Shaun Cassidy; Story by : Reggie Rock Bythewood & Ice-T & Dick Wolf and Shaun Cassidy	October 17, 1997	83598
2	"Con Law"	Jace Alexander	Story by : Ed Zuckerman & Ron Lux; Teleplay by : Ron Lux	October 24, 1997	K2605
3	"In Concert"	Allan Arkush	Ethlie Ann Vare	October 31, 1997	K2604
4	"Con Artist"	Jim Charleston	Gerry Conway	November 7, 1997	K2601
5	"Contact Sport"	Michael Lange	Randy Anderson	November 14, 1997	K2603
6	"Con Amore"	James Quinn	Alfonso H. Moreno	November 21, 1997	K2607
7	"Rashocon"	Joseph L. Scanlan	Story by : Gerry Conway; Teleplay by : Gerry Conway & Ethlie Ann Vare	December 5, 1997	K2613
8	"Three of a Con"	Michael Vittes	Gerry Conway & Randy Anderson	December 12, 1997	K2612
9	"Mint Condition"	Jace Alexander	Story by : Randy Anderson; Teleplay by : Randy Anderson & Ron Lux	January 2, 1998	K2611
10	"Confidence Man"	Frederick K Keller	Tom Spezialy & Alan Cross	January 9, 1998	K2608
11	"Con-traband"	Richard Compton	Clyde Phillips	January 16, 1998	K2614
12	"Con-tinental"	Richard Compton	Story by : Alfred Gough & Miles Millar; Teleplay by : Ethlie Ann Vare	March 6, 1998	K2617
13	"Wrath of Con"	Jefery Levy	Alan Cross & Tom Spezialy	March 13, 1998	K2618
14	"Con-Strained"	Richard Compton	Story by : Kevin Stevens; Teleplay by : Stan Berkowitz	March 20, 1998	K2620
15	"Conspiracy"	Dan Lerner	Ed Zuckerman & Gerry Conway	March 27, 1998	K2616
16	"Contamination"	Greg Yaitanes	Gerry Conway	April 3, 1998	K2619
17	"Conundrum"	Joseph L. Scanlan	Stan Berkowitz	April 10, 1998	K2615
18	"Con Vivants"	Richard Compton	Ed Zuckerman	April 17, 1998	K2602
