= Cape May Stage =

Theatre company in New Jersey, United States

Coordinates: 38.9335°N 74.9236°W

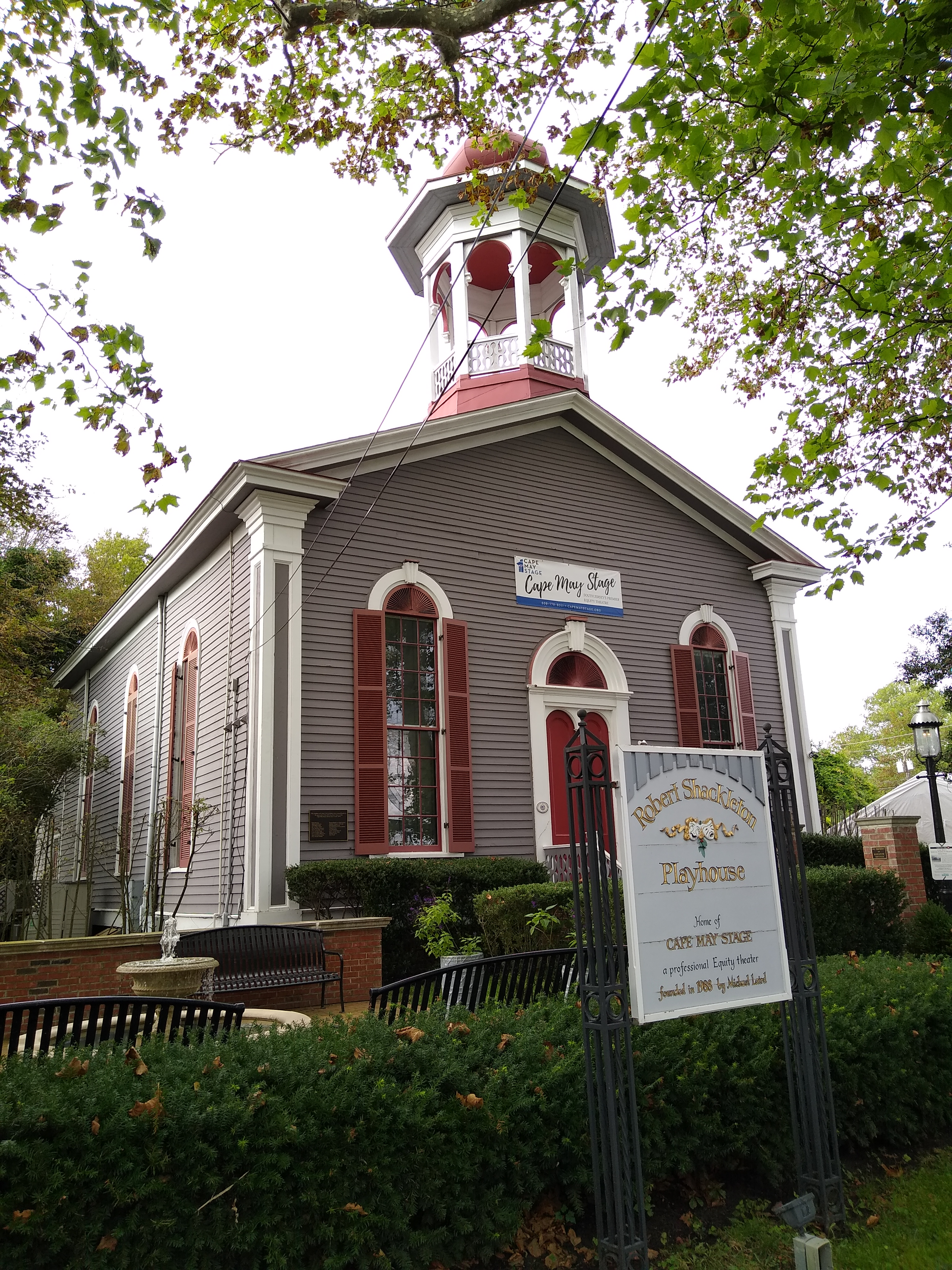
Robert Shackleton Playhouse

The Cape May Stage is a theatre company that performs in the Robert Shackleton Playhouse. It is located at the corner of Bank and Lafayette Streets in downtown Cape May, New Jersey, United States.

== Aim ==
Cape May Stage provides professional Actors Equity theatre, in an intimate setting, to the residents and visitors of Cape May and surrounding areas, and fosters arts education in academic and non-traditional venues.

== The history of Cape May stage ==
Cape May Stage has operated as a professional Equity theatre since 1988. It was founded by Michael Laird, a Cape May resident and professional actor and director. For the first five seasons the theatre operated in the summer months only. Programming eventually grew to a 70 night season in 1992. In 1995, leasing of the former Welcome Center (a city owned historical landmark building) as a performance site was established. The 1853 structure is considered one of the key buildings in the Historic Landmark district by the Historic Preservation Commission.

Grant funding from the New Jersey State Council on the Arts was awarded in 1996, which allowed for further improvements to the company's productions. In 1998, the theatre programming expanded to an eight month/six production season, to more fully serve the year-round residents and off-season visitors to the Cape May area.

Upon the passing of Cape May Stage's founder in 2001, a new artistic director, Michael Carleton, was recruited and hired to run the day-to-day operations of the theatre as well as to expand the programming and services provided to the community and its visitors. In 2008, Cape May Stage celebrated their 20th anniversary season with the unveiling of the restored Robert Shackleton Playhouse.

== Cape May Stage programming ==
Cape May Stage operates from mid-May through December with over 150 performances. Shows produced are mostly traditional and contemporary works, and new works by both established and up-and-coming playwrights.

The shows produced annually include six or seven main stage productions plus featured solo productions that range from Magicians and Puppet Shows to new and original biographical one-act plays frequently scheduled on Monday and Tuesday nights during the season.

Directors, designers, actors, production staff, and teaching artists are brought in from around the country (New York, Philadelphia, Orlando, Chicago, Los Angeles) to fulfill an eight-month production season and ten-month education outreach calendar. In addition to award-winning regional artists, Cape May Stage has also attracted renowned actors such as Robert Prosky (Tony Award nominee) and Estelle Parsons (Academy Award winner) to take part in projects. In 2008, the theatre's production of Arthur Miller’s The Price which starred Robert Prosky and his two sons, transferred to The Walnut Street Theatre in Philadelphia, the nation's oldest theatre, and then to Theatre J in Washington D.C. to be part of a national Miller celebration.

The annual production roster generally includes at least one world premiere, and several New Jersey or regional premieres. For several seasons now Cape May Stage has been able to bring a nationally renowned playwright to Cape May to work in conjunction with the company on a production of the playwright's work. Past seasons have included Tony and Emmy Award winners and a Pulitzer nominee.

It is a member of the New Jersey Theatre Alliance.
