= Robert Prosky =

American actor (1930–2008)

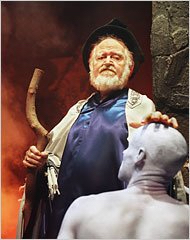
- Prosky in 2002
- Born: Robert Józef Porzuczek; December 13, 1930; Philadelphia, Pennsylvania, U.S.
- Died: December 8, 2008 (aged 77); Washington, D.C., U.S.
- Resting place: Rock Creek Cemetery; Washington, D.C., U.S.
- Other name: Robert Józef Prosky
- Occupation: Actor
- Years active: 1971–2008
- Spouse: Ida Hove (m. 1960)
- Children: 3, including John Prosky

Robert Prosky (born Robert Joseph Porzuczek; December 13, 1930 – December 8, 2008) was an American actor. He became a well-known supporting actor in the 1980s with his roles in Thief (1981), Christine (1983), The Natural (1984), and Broadcast News (1987).

Prosky's other notable movies include Gremlins 2: The New Batch (1990), Hoffa (1992), Mrs. Doubtfire (1993), Last Action Hero (1993), Rudy (1993), Miracle on 34th Street (1994), Dead Man Walking (1995), and Mad City (1997). His most notable television role was of Sgt. Stan Jablonski on the TV police drama Hill Street Blues.

== Early life ==
Prosky, a Polish American, was born in the Manayunk neighborhood of Philadelphia, Pennsylvania, to Helen (Kuhn) and Joseph Porzuczek. His father was a grocer and butcher. He was raised in a working-class neighborhood and studied at the American Theatre Wing, later graduating from Temple University. He performed at Old Academy Players, a small theater in the East Falls section of Philadelphia, adjacent to Manayunk. He also served in the U.S. Air Force during the Korean War, but got a hardship discharge to help with the family store when his father died unexpectedly.

== Career ==
Prosky appeared in Thief (1981), Hanky Panky (1982), The Natural (1984), Outrageous Fortune (1987), Broadcast News (1987), The Great Outdoors (1988), Things Change (1988), Loose Cannons (1990), Gremlins 2: The New Batch (1990), Green Card (1990), Far and Away (1992), Hoffa (1992), Last Action Hero (1993), Rudy (1993), Mrs. Doubtfire (1993), Miracle on 34th Street (1994), and Mad City (1997), Dead Man Walking (1995) and The Chamber (1996), with actor Raymond J. Barry. He also plays Will Darnell, the man who owned the auto repair shop where Arnie Cunningham (Keith Gordon) rebuilds the possessed car "Christine" in the 1983 film based on Stephen King's novel.

In addition to appearing in films, Prosky appeared in many television series. He became known for his role as Sgt. Stan Jablonski on Hill Street Blues. He also portrayed Jake "the Snake" Connolly on a two-part 1991 episode of Coach. He was considered for the role of Martin Crane in Frasier and later made a guest appearance in the series as a reclusive writer who befriended the character. He was offered the role of Coach Ernie Pantusso on Cheers, but turned it down; he later portrayed Rebecca Howe's father on the same show. His role in Veronica's Closet was likely a nod to this, as in both shows he played the father of a character portrayed by Kirstie Alley. He was also a regular on the TV series Danny.

In addition to his film and television career, he appeared in numerous theater plays at the Arena Stage in Washington, D.C., most notably as Willy Loman in Death of a Salesman. Prosky often performed at Arena Stage with over 100 stage credits to his name at that theatre alone. He played Shelly Levene in the 1984 Chicago and Broadway production of David Mamet's Pulitzer Prize-winning play Glengarry Glen Ross. He was also a board member of the Cape May Stage in Cape May, New Jersey.

Prosky received or was nominated for two Tony awards, two Helen Hayes awards, an Emmy, the Drama Desk award, and the American Express Tribute To An American Actor. He continued to perform on stage and present lectures on his long career at universities, film festivals, for theater benefits, business groups and on cruises.

== Personal life ==
In 1960, he married Ida Hove, with whom he had three sons, including, John.

== Death ==
Prosky died on December 8, 2008, aged 77, while living in the Capitol Hill neighborhood of Washington, D.C. His son, John, said that the cause was complications of heart surgery at the Washington Hospital Center. The New York Times described him: "a craggy-faced, heavyset character actor who, after 23 years in regional theater, became a familiar face on Broadway, in movies and on television, notably as a gruff desk sergeant in the later years of Hill Street Blues."

Playbill described him: "He was best suited to playing salt-of-the-earth characters, sometimes with a mischievous or slightly sinister edge."

== Filmography ==
=== Film ===
Year	Title	Role	Notes
1978	The Brink's Job	Cop in Police Lineup	Uncredited
1981	Thief	Leo	
1982	Hanky Panky	Hiram Calder	
1982	Monsignor	Bishop Walkman	
1983	The Lords of Discipline	LTC Thomas "The Bear" Berrineau	
1983	Christine	Will Darnell	
1983	The Keep	Father Fonescu	
1984	The Natural	The Judge (team owner)	
1985	Into Thin Air	Jim Conway	
1987	Outrageous Fortune	Stanislav Korzenowski	
1987	Big Shots	Keegan	
1987	Broadcast News	Ernie Merriman	
1988	The Great Outdoors	Wally	
1988	Things Change	Joseph 'Don Giuseppe' Vincent	
1989	The Heist	Dancer	
1990	Loose Cannons	Von Metz	
1990	Gremlins 2: The New Batch	Grandpa Fred	
1990	Funny About Love	Emil Thomas "E.T." Bergman	
1990	Green Card	Brontë's Lawyer	
1991	Age Isn't Everything	Grandpa Irving	
1992	Far and Away	Daniel Christie	
1992	Hoffa	Billy Flynn	
1993	Last Action Hero	Nick	
1993	Rudy	Father John Cavanaugh	
1993	Mrs. Doubtfire	Jonathan Lundy	
1994	Miracle on 34th Street	Judge Henry Harper	
1995	The Scarlet Letter	Horace Stonehall	
1995	Dead Man Walking	Hilton Barber	
1996	The Chamber	E. Garner Goodman	
1997	Mad City	Lou Potts	
1998	The Lake	Herb	
1999	Dudley Do-Right	Inspector Fenwick	
2002	Eye See You	McKenzie	
2002	Death to Smoochy	Network Chairman	Uncredited
2005	Suits on the Loose	Bishop Hollister	
2009	The Skeptic	Father Wymond	Final film role; Released posthumously

=== Television ===
Year	Title	Role	Notes
1984–1987	Hill Street Blues	Sgt. Stan Jablonski	Main cast
1987	Murder She Wrote	Bishop Patrick Shea	
1988	The Murder of Mary Phagan	Tom Watson	
1989	From the Dead of Night	Dr Walter Hovde	
1990	A Green Journey	Bishop Baker	
1991	Brooklyn Bridge	Mr. Joseph Cardini, the neighborhood grocer.	
1991	Coach	Jake "The Snake" Connolly	Episodes: "The Pineapple Bowl: Parts 1 & 2"
1992	Cheers	Navy Captain Franklin Howe	
1993	Roseanne	Colonel Russ	
1996	Frasier	T.H. Houghton	
1997–1998	Veronica's Closet	Pat Chase	
1997–2002	The Practice	Father Patrick	5 episodes
1998	The Lake	Herb	Television movie
1998	LateLine	Boone LeGarde	Episode: "Pilot"
1999	Swing Vote	Chief Justice of the United States	Television movie
2000	Touched by an Angel	Dr. Robert Harrigan	Episode: "The Grudge"
2001	Danny	Lenny	Main cast
2003	K Street	Tommy's Dad	3 episodes
2007	ER	Wayne Rutley	Episode: "Family Business"; Final television role

=== Stage ===
Year	Title	Role	Location/Notes
1971	Moonchildren (American premiere)	Mr. Willis	Arena Stage, Washington, D.C./later moved to Broadway in 1972
1975	The Dybbuk	Rabbi Az ielke	Arena Stage, Washington, D.C./with Dianne Wiest
1980	Galileo	Galileo Galilei	Arena Stage, Washington, D.C./Play by Bertolt Brecht
1983	A View from the Bridge	Alfieri	New York City
1984	Glengarry Glen Ross	Shelly Levene	John Golden Theatre, New York City/Tony Award Nomination/ Drama Desk Award for Outstanding Ensemble
1988	A Walk in the Woods	Andrei Botvinnik	Booth Theatre, New York City/Tony Award Nomination
1996	Camping with Henry and Tom	Thomas Edison	Lucille Lortel Theatre, New York City
2002	An American Daughter	Alan Hughes	Arena Stage, Washington, D.C.
2004	Democracy	Herbert Wehner	Brooks Atkinson Theatre, New York City
2006	Awake and Sing!	Jacob	Arena Stage, Washington, D.C.
2008	The Price	Solomon	Walnut Street Theatre, Philadelphia; Theater J, Washington, D.C. (joint production)
