= Age Isn't Everything =

- Directed by: Douglas Katz
- Written by: Douglas Katz
- Produced by: Kerry Orent
- Starring: Jonathan Silverman; Robert Prosky; Paul Sorvino; Rita Moreno
- Cinematography: Michael Spiller
- Edited by: Dorian Harris
- Music by: Glen Roven
- Distributed by: Live Home Video
- Release date: November 26, 1991; (video)
- Running time: 90 mins
- Country: United States
- Language: English

Age Isn't Everything (also known as Life in the Food Chain) is a 1991 comedy film directed by Douglas Katz and starring Jonathan Silverman, Robert Prosky, and Rita Moreno. The film premiered at the 1991 American Film Market and was consecutively released on video by Live Home Video.

== Premise ==
21-year-old Seymour (Silverman) dreams of becoming an astronaut but is pressured by his parents (Moreno and Sorvino) to go to Harvard law school and then go into business. After graduating, Seymour lets go of his dreams and becomes a businessman. One day, he wakes up and suddenly feels and acts like an 83-year-old man. He is fired from his job for being "too old" and doctors cannot explain the situation.

== Cast ==
- Jonathan Silverman as Seymour
- Robert Prosky as Grandpa Irving
- Rita Moreno as Rita
- Paul Sorvino as Max
- Robert Cicchini as Bruno
- Brian Williams as Gerrard
- Bella Abzug as herself
- Joyce Brothers as herself

== Production ==
The film was shot between October 8 and November 3, 1990.
