= Dean Collins (actor) =

American actor

- Occupation: Actor
- Years active: 1999–2010

Dean Collins is an American former actor, best known for playing the character Mike Gold in sitcom The War at Home. The series ran from September 2005 to April 2007. Previously, he had recurring roles in MADtv's "Reading Caboose" skit as Ernie, and as Warren Feide in Jack & Bobby. Collins appeared as Harry Beardsley in the 2005 film Yours, Mine & Ours, as Garrett in the 2006 film Hoot, and in the 2008 film The Least of These. In 2011, Collins was cast in the pilot episode of ABC's Lost and Found. Collins makes regular appearances as the unofficial, part time, occasional co-host on actor Michael Rapaport's podcast, I Am Rapaport.

== Early life ==
Collins has a younger sister, and two older brothers, Blake Collins, a professional singer-songwriter, and Nick Collins, who works at a talent agency in Beverly Hills. Collins is Jewish.

Collins became friends with fellow actor Logan Lerman, while playing his character's best friend in Jack & Bobby, and they remained close after the series' cancellation. They worked together again on Hoot, where Collins had a supporting role. In their spare time, the two collaborated on creating short comedic films, which they uploaded to YouTube under their joint account name of "monkeynuts1069".

Collins and Lerman formed a band called Indigo, along with musician Daniel Pashman. Collins sang lead vocals, Lerman played keyboard and guitar, and Pashman played drums.

== Filmography ==
=== Film ===
Year	Title	Role
2005	Yours, Mine & Ours	Harry Beardsley
2006	Hoot	Garrett
2008	The Least of These	Travis

=== Television ===
Year	Title	Role	Notes
1999–2000	MADtv	Ernie	4 episodes
2004–2005	Jack & Bobby	Warren Feide	11 episodes
2005–2007	The War at Home	Mike Gold	Series regular
2008	Without a Trace	Corey Pickford	Episode: "Last Call"
2010	Community	Scott Waugh	Episode: "The Art of Discourse"
