= Rob Lotterstein =

American television writer and producer

- Born: Roslyn, New York, U.S.A.
- Education: George Washington University
- Occupations: Screenwriter, producer
- Years active: 1995–present
- Partner: Phil Oster

Rob Lotterstein is an American screenwriter and producer. He has written and produced for numerous television sitcoms including Boy Meets World, Suddenly Susan, Ellen and Will & Grace, as well as serving as creator and executive producer of the FOX sitcom The War at Home. Lotterstein also served as executive producer on the Disney Channel original series Shake It Up.

== Early life ==
Lotterstein was born in Roslyn, New York and raised in the Jewish faith. He graduated from George Washington University with a degree in marketing and went on to earn a master's degree in advertising from Northwestern University.

== Career ==
Lotterstein began his career writing commercials before landing his first job as a staff writer for HBO's Emmy Award winning show Dream On. It was during his time writing for the show Dream On that Lotterstein first began working with Ellen Idelson, who would become his writing partner for nearly the next 10 years until her death in 2003. Some of his notable writing/producing credits include The Nanny, Boy Meets World, Suddenly Susan, Ellen, Will & Grace and Darren Star's Grosse Pointe. Lotterstein was the creator, writer, and executive producer of the show The War At Home for which he was nominated for a GLAAD Award as well as The Humanitas Prize. In 2010, he made a cameo on the FOX animated series Family Guy providing the voice of a CBS executive trying to "refine" Brian's script for a television pilot. Lotterstein used to serve as the executive producer of the Disney Channel's dance-driven sitcom Shake It Up!.

== Personal life ==
Lotterstein is openly gay, and currently lives in Los Angeles with his husband, Phil Oster.

== Filmography ==
=== Television ===
Year	Title	Credited as	Notes
2015–2018	K.C. Undercover	Executive producer / Show Runner/ teleplay	
2010–2013	Shake It Up	Executive producer / show runner/ writer	
2010	Family Guy	Actor - Role: Television Executive (voice)	Episode 8.15: "Brian Griffin's House of Payne"
2005–2007	The War at Home	Creator / Show runner/ Executive producer	
2005	The Bad Girl's Guide	Co-executive producer / writer	
2004	The Big House	Co-executive producer / writer	
2003	Sixteen to Life	Creator / executive producer	Unaired pilot
2001	Danny	Co-executive producer	
2000–2001	Grosse Pointe	Supervising producer / writer	
1999–2000	Suddenly Susan	Producer / writer	
1999–2000	Will & Grace	Writer	
1999	Working	Co-producer	
1998	Holding the Baby	Writer	
1997–1998	Boy Meets World	Writer / executive story editor	
1996–1997	Ellen	Writer	
1995–1996	Caroline in the City	Writer	
1995	The Nanny	Writer	
1995	Dream On	Writer	
