= The Big House (TV series) =

2004 American sitcom television series

- Genre: Sitcom
- Created by: Stephen Engel; David Zuckerman
- Starring: Kevin Hart; Faizon Love; Arnetia Walker; Yvette Nicole Brown; Aaron Grady; Keith David
- Composer: Mark Mothersbaugh
- Country of origin: United States
- Original language: English
- No. of seasons: 1
- No. of episodes: 6

Production
- Running time: 30 minutes
- Production companies: Imagine Television; 20th Century Fox Television

Original release
- Network: ABC
- Release: April 2 – April 30, 2004

The Big House is an American prime time television sitcom starring actor/comedian Kevin Hart. It ran on the ABC television network in April 2004, lasting for only six episodes.

The series represents a mirror-opposite of the NBC sitcom The Fresh Prince of Bel-Air. Kevin Hart is a wealthy, pampered student from Malibu. After his father is arrested and imprisoned for embezzlement, Kevin moves to Philadelphia to live with his working-class aunt, uncle and cousins (the Cleveland family), and enrolls in Drexel University.

== Cast ==
- Kevin Hart as Kevin Cleveland
- Faizon Love as Warren Cleveland
- Arnetia Walker as Tina Cleveland
- Yvette Nicole Brown as Eartha Cleveland
- Aaron Grady as C.J. Cleveland
- Keith David as Clarence Cleveland

== Episodes ==
No.	Title	Directed by	Written by	Original release date	Prod. code	Viewers (millions)
1	"Hart Transplant"	Barnet Kellman	Stephen Engel	April 2, 2004	1AJA02	6.13
Kevin is a rich kid from Malibu. He has it all, a great house and money. But one day his dad, who is also Kevin's manager, is arrested for embezzling millions of dollars from his clients. Later his family from Philadelphia welcomes Kevin to live with them to start a new life. When he moves into "The Big House" he is forced to live in the basement.
2	"Almost Touched by an Angel"	Andy Cadiff	Ian Edwards & Tommy Tallarino	April 9, 2004	1AJA06	5.13
Kevin is a non-believer but he is smitten with Angel, one of the beautiful girls at the family's church. Kevin only agrees to get baptized because he wants to win Angel over.
3	"A Friend in Need"	Joe Regalbuto	Julie Brown	April 14, 2004	1AJA04	6.14
The family is overjoyed when Eartha brings home her boyfriend, Martin, who unexpectedly hits it off with friendless, new-in-town Kevin. Eartha and Kevin soon begin competing to spend time with Martin, with comical results.
4	"The Kidney Stays in the Picture"	Barnet Kellman	Mark Reisman	April 16, 2004	1AJA01	6.39
Kevin tries to get Warren to go to a Lil' Kim concert, despite Aunt Tina's edict that they have to stay home. When his cousin reveals that Aunt Tina gave him one of her kidneys during a childhood illness, Kevin begins to understand Warren's attachment to his mom – until a little digging on his part reveals the truth about his aunt's tall tale.
5	"The Anniversary Party"	Barnet Kellman	Rob Lotterstein	April 23, 2004	1AJA03	5.09
Kevin, trying to show some love for Aunt Tina and Uncle Clarence, cajoles his cousins into throwing their parents an anniversary party. But his plan goes horribly wrong when he stumbles upon a deep, dark family secret — Tina and Clarence were married two years after Warren was born, a little fact they've neglected to tell their children.
6	"Kevin's Birthday"	Andy Cadiff	Michael Kramer	April 30, 2004	1AJA05	5.73
Kevin faces a birthday crisis when Warren spills the beans that the family has gone to great effort to plan a surprise bash for him - at the same time that Kevin's best friend from Malibu descends on Philly, determined to treat his buddy to a lavish night on the town.

== Home media ==
Olive Films, under license from 20th Century Fox Home Entertainment, released the entire series on DVD in Region 1 on January 13, 2015.

In 2022, the series was made available for streaming online on Fox Corporation's Tubi.
