= Dream On (TV series) =

American television sitcom (1990–1996)

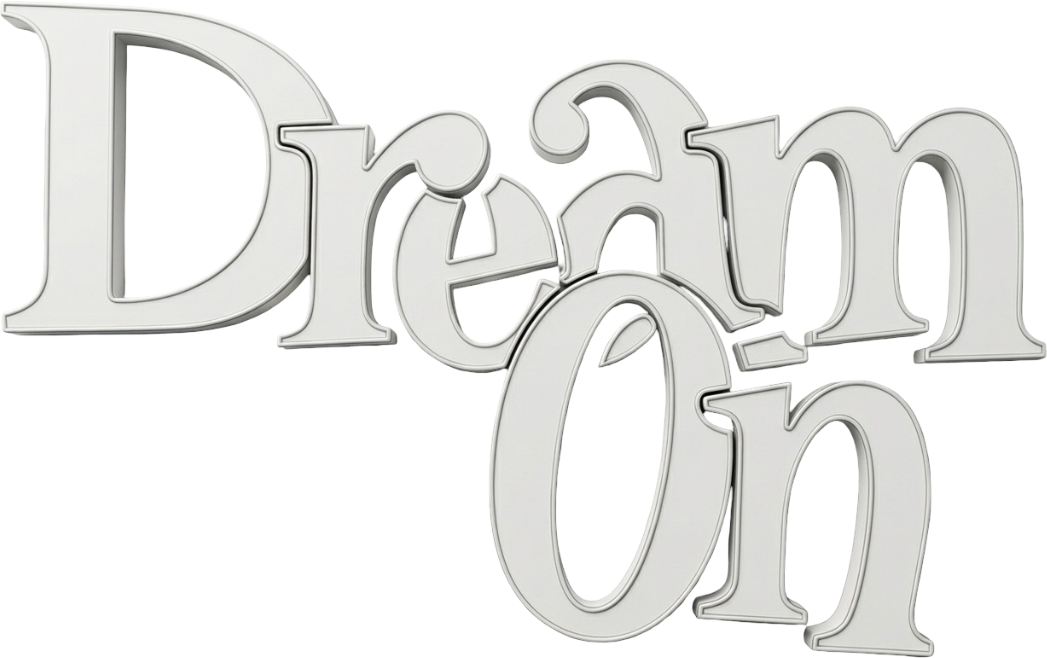
- Genre: Sitcom
- Created by: Marta Kauffman; David Crane
- Starring: Brian Benben; Chris Demetral; Denny Dillon; Wendie Malick; Dorien Wilson; Michael McKean
- Theme music composer: Michael Skloff
- Composer: Michael Skloff
- Country of origin: United States
- Original language: English
- No. of seasons: 6
- No. of episodes: 120 (list of episodes)

Production
- Executive producers: Kevin Bright; John Landis
- Producers: David Crane; Jeff Greenstein; Robb Idels; Marta Kauffman; Jeff Strauss; Ron Wolotzky
- Camera setup: Single camera
- Running time: 30 minutes
- Production companies: Kevin Bright Productions; St. Clare Entertainment; MCA Television Entertainment

Original release
- Network: HBO
- Release: July 8, 1990 – March 27, 1996

Dream On is an American sitcom television series created by Marta Kauffman and David Crane. It follows the family life, romantic life, and career of Martin Tupper, a divorced New York City book editor played by Brian Benben. The show distinctively interjected clips from older black-and-white television series to punctuate Martin's feelings or thoughts. It ran for six seasons on HBO between July 8, 1990, and March 27, 1996.

== Premise ==
The show centered on Martin Tupper's life in an apartment in New York City with his young son, and relating to his ex-wife, while trying to date other women and succeed as an editor for a small book publisher with Toby, his brassy secretary. Judith, his ex-wife, went on to marry Dr. Richard Stone—the never-seen, most impossibly successful man on the planet (astronaut, brain surgeon, the fifth Beatle and consultant to the Pope); despite Martin's undying love for Judith, he could never compete with the legendary Dr. Stone.

The opening indicates Martin's mother parked him in front of the TV and he then grew up engrossed in it. It briefly shows a babysitter making out with a boyfriend behind young Martin. The show was notable for its frequent use of clips from old movies and TV shows to express Martin's inner life and feelings, which lent it much of its quirky appeal, reminding viewers about the effect of television on their consciousness. The show was also significant for being one of the first American sitcoms to use uncensored profanity and nudity.

== Cast ==
- Brian Benben as Martin Tupper, a book editor for a smaller publishing house that usually specializes in romance novels and other less prestigious literary fare. Having practically been raised by television in the 1950s, his thoughts are shown to the viewer through clips of classic black and white programming. He struggles to find love (or something like it) while sorting out the feelings he still has for his ex-wife, Judith.
- Wendie Malick as Judith Tupper Stone, Martin's ex-wife who has since remarried the literal perfect man, Dr. Richard Stone.
- Chris Demetral as Jeremy Tupper, Martin's teenaged son.
- Dorien Wilson (seasons 2–6) and Jeff Joseph (season 1) as Eddie Charles, a talk show host and Martin's best friend.
- Denny Dillon as Toby Pedalbee, Martin's secretary/assistant
- Michael McKean as Gibby Fiske, Martin's boss (recurring during seasons 2–6)
- Renée Taylor as Martin's mother, Doris Tupper (occasional during seasons 3–5)

== Production ==
The show was created by Marta Kauffman and David Crane, who also served as producers. Dream On was executive produced by Kevin Bright and John Landis. Landis also directed several episodes of the series.

== Episodes ==
Season	Episodes	Originally released	
Season	Episodes	First released	Last released
1	14	July 8, 1990	October 7, 1990
2	15	July 7, 1991	October 6, 1991
3	26	June 6, 1992	November 21, 1992
4	25	June 2, 1993	March 30, 1994
5	13	June 22, 1994	September 14, 1994
6	27	July 19, 1995	March 27, 1996

== Broadcast ==
Dream On first aired on July 8, 1990, on HBO, and was cancelled by HBO in March 1996.

=== Syndication ===
Two versions of each episode were filmed; the HBO version and a second version which did not contain nudity or strong language. The tamer version aired on Fox television from January 8 to July 3, 1995. A bowdlerized version also aired in syndication on Comedy Central from 1996 to 1999, with language and nudity edited for broadcast.

In 2025, the series began streaming on The Roku Channel, making it the first time Dream On is being streamed.

== Reception ==
=== Critical reception ===
Time magazine called the show "engaging", noting that its use of old clips was "a clever gimmick [that] perks up familiar material" and later called the second season of the "decidedly adult sitcom...better than ever."

The New York Times had mixed opinions about the show. In their first-season review, John J. O'Connor said Dream On was not "different from ordinary network fare...except for, as might be expected, the more freewheeling language and treatments of sex"; by the season's third episode, the show's protagonist is "already becoming just another nice bachelor father, not all that different from the one John Forsythe played on television several decades ago." About a year later, O'Connor said, while the show "has its weak spots, most notably in a pointless tendency to be smarmy" with "clips... that are sometimes less witty than painfully obvious. But Dream On takes unusual chances and has a habit of turning out to be refreshingly original."

=== Awards and nominations ===
Year	Title	Category	Recipient
1991	CableACE Award	Editing a Comedy Special or Series/Music Special	John Axness (for "The First Episode")
1991	CableACE Award	Comedy Series	Kevin Bright, David Crane, Robb Idels, Marta Kauffman, John Landis, Bill Sanders, and Ron Wolotzky
1991	CableACE Award	Actress in a Comedy Series	Wendie Malick
1993	CableACE Award	Actress & Actor in a Comedy Series	Wendie Malick & Brian Benben
1994	CableACE Award	Editing in a Comedy/Music Special or Series	David Helfand (for "The Son Also Rises")
1994	CableACE Award	Actress in a Comedy Series	Wendie Malick
1995	CableACE Award	Actress in a Comedy Series	Wendie Malick
1993	Emmy Award	Outstanding Individual Achievement in Directing in a Comedy Series	Betty Thomas (for "For Peter's Sake")
1993	Emmy Award	Outstanding Guest Actor in a Comedy Series	David Clennon (for "For Peter's Sake")
1994	GLAAD Media Awards	Outstanding Comedy Series	-
1993	Young Artist Award	Best Young Actor Starring in a Cable Series	Chris Demetral

== Home media ==
Seasons one and two were released on DVD for both regions 1 and 2; seasons three through six have not been released.
