= Ellen Idelson =

American television producer and writer (1961–2003)

- Born: June 13, 1961; Los Angeles, California, U.S.
- Died: September 19, 2003 (aged 42); Los Angeles, California, U.S.
- Education: San Francisco State University (BA); Harvard University (MFA)
- Occupations: Actress; television producer; television writer
- Years active: 1987–2003
- Father: Bill Idelson

Ellen Idelson (June 13, 1961 – September 19, 2003) was an American television producer, television writer and actress.

== Life and career ==
Idelson was born Los Angeles, California. She is the daughter of actor and television writer Bill Idelson and actress Seemah Wilder.

She attended San Francisco State University and the Harvard University American Repertory Theatre Advanced Training Institute, following the career paths of both her parents.

As a television producer and writer she worked on the series The Nanny, Caroline in the City, Ellen, Boy Meets World, Will & Grace, Suddenly Susan, Grosse Pointe and Working (only as a producer), with all of the aforementioned work being with fellow writer and producer Rob Lotterstein.

As an actress she did a number theatre work performing in local Los Angeles theaters, including the Mark Taper Forum and productions of Theatre West and the Los Angeles Shakespeare Festival. She also appeared on television in sketches of The Tonight Show with Jay Leno and having small roles in Will & Grace. In 2001, she had the lead role in the independent film Moose Mating. Idelson also helped found Los Angeles Theatresports, serving as artistic director.

== Death ==
Idelson died on September 19, 2003, at the Cedars-Sinai Medical Center due complications from cancer and Crohn's disease, a disease she suffered from for much of her life. She was 42 years old.

The pilot episode of Fox sitcom The War at Home was dedicated in her memory. The series was created and executive produced by Idelson's former producing and writing partner, Rob Lotterstein.
