= Stephen Engel =

American television producer and writer

- Occupations: Television producer, television writer
- Years active: 1992–present

Stephen Engel is an American television producer and writer. He has served as a writer and producer on many TV series, including The Big Bang Theory, Dream On, Mad About You, Alright Already, Just Shoot Me!, The War at Home, A.N.T. Farm, and Mighty Med.

He also created and served as the showrunner of several series, including Inside Schwartz, Work with Me, and The Big House.

Engel is an alumnus of Tufts University and New York University School of Law.
