= Bella Thorne discography =

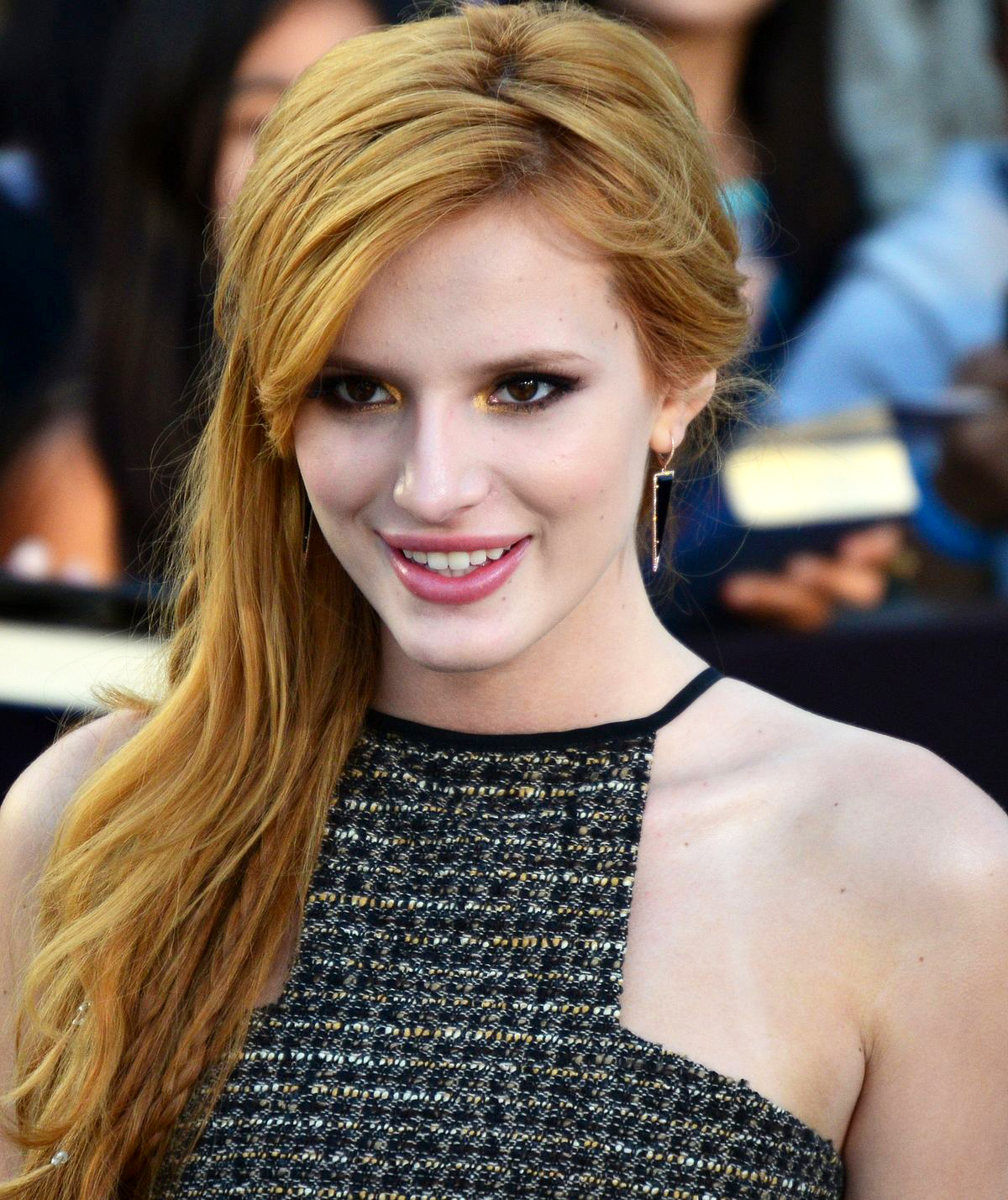
- Thorne at the Divergent premiere, in 2014.
- EPs: 2
- Singles: 16
- Music videos: 21
- Promotional singles: 1
- Featured singles: 4

American actress and singer Bella Thorne has released two extended plays, sixteen singles, four featured singles, one promotional single, and 21 music videos. Thorne's debut single, "Watch Me", featuring Zendaya, was released on June 21, 2011, and reached number 86 on the US Billboard Hot 100 chart, and number nine on the US Top Heatseekers chart, and was certified gold by the RIAA in 2013. Her second single, "TTYLXOX", was released on March 6, 2012, reaching number 97 on the Billboard Hot 100.

In March 2013, Bella Thorne announced she had signed to Hollywood Records, and began working on material for her debut album. On May 2, 2014, it was revealed her debut album would be titled Call It Whatever, and on May 14, she released the single, "Call It Whatever". On October 15, 2014, Thorne revealed her debut album had been canceled, and she released an EP, Jersey, on November 17, 2014 instead.

In March 2018, Thorne started her own record label, Filthy Fangs.

== Extended plays ==
Title	Details
Made in Japan (with Zendaya)	Released: August 21, 2012; Format: Digital download, streaming; Label: Walt Disney
Jersey	Released: November 17, 2014; Format: Digital download, streaming; Label: Hollywood

== Singles ==
=== As lead artist ===
List of singles, with selected chart positions and certifications
Title	Year	Peak chart positions							Certifications	Album
Title	Year	US	US Dance	US Kid	US Pop Dig.	US Triller	CAN	UK	Certifications	Album
"Watch Me" (with Zendaya)	2011	86	—	1	28	—	—	—	RIAA: Gold	Shake It Up: Break It Down
"TTYLXOX"	2012	97	—	1	23	—	71	170		Shake It Up: Live 2 Dance
"Fashion Is My Kryptonite" (with Zendaya)	2012	—	—	2	—	—	—	—		Made in Japan
"Contagious Love" (with Zendaya)	2013	—	—	1	—	—	—	—		Shake It Up: I Love Dance
"Call It Whatever"	2014	—	10	—	—	—	—	—		Non-album single
"Burn So Bright"	2018	—	—	—	—	—	—	—		Midnight Sun
"Walk with Me"	2018	—	—	—	—	—	—	—		Midnight Sun
"Goat"	2018	—	—	—	—	—	—	—		Non-album singles
"Bitch I'm Bella Thorne"	2018	—	—	—	—	—	—	—		Non-album singles
"Pussy Mine"	2018	—	—	—	—	—	—	—		Non-album singles
"Lonely"	2020	—	*			—	—	—		Non-album singles
"SFB"	2020	—	*			—	—	—		Non-album singles
"Shake It"	2021	—	*			20	—	—		Non-album singles
"Phantom" (featuring Malina Moye)	2021	—	*			—	—	—		Non-album singles
"Up in Flames" (Note: "Up In Flames" was released as a standalone single for the movie Time Is Up.) (with Benjamin Mascolo)	2021	—	*			—	—	—		Non-album singles
"In You" (with Juicy J)	2021	—	*			—	—	—		Non-album singles
"—" denotes releases that did not chart or were not released in that territory. "*" denotes the chart did not exist at that time.

=== As featuring artist ===
Song	Year	Album
"Just Call" (Prince Fox featuring Bella Thorne)	2017	All This Music, Vol. 1
"Salad Dressing" (Borgore featuring Bella Thorne)	2017	Non-album single
"Clout 9" (Lil Phag featuring Bella Thorne, Tana Mongeau and Dr. Woke)	2018	God Hates LIL Phag
"Do Not Disturb" (Steve Aoki featuring Bella Thorne)	2019	Neon Future III

=== Promotional singles ===
List of singles, with selected chart positions and certifications
Title	Year	Album
"Bubblegum Boy" (with Pia Mia)	2011	Non-album promotional single

== Other charted songs ==
List of other charted songs, with selected chart positions
Title	Year	Peak chart positions	Album
Title	Year	US Kid	Album
"The Same Heart" (with Zendaya)	2012	4	Made in Japan
"Made in Japan" (with Zendaya)	2012	3	Made in Japan
"This Is My Dance Floor" (with Zendaya)	2013	2	Shake It Up: I Love Dance
"Blow the System"	2013	20	Shake It Up: I Love Dance

== Guest appearances ==
Title	Year	Other artist(s)	Album
"Something to Dance For / TTYLXOX Mash-Up"	2012	Zendaya	Shake It Up: Live 2 Dance
"Rockin' Around the Christmas Tree"	2012	—N/a	Disney Channel Holiday Playlist
"Get'cha Head in the Game"	2013	—N/a	Shake It Up: I Love Dance
"Christmas Wrapping"	2013	—N/a	Holidays Unwrapped
"Ring Ring (Hey Girls)"	2014	—N/a	Disney Channel Play It Loud
"Let's Get Tricky"	2014	Roshon	Disney Channel Play It Loud
"Bad Case of U"	2014	—N/a	Mostly Ghostly: Have You Met My Ghoulfriend?
"Reaching"	2018	—N/a	Midnight Sun
"Sweetest Feeling"	2018	—N/a	Midnight Sun
"Let the Light In"	2018	—N/a	Midnight Sun
"Hard"	2019	Ashley All Day	Plug Diaries
"Bang!"	2020	Drty Lndry and Kanner	Chick Fight - Round One

== Music videos ==
As lead artist
Title	Year	Director
"Watch Me"	2011	Marc Klasfeld
"Bubblegum Boy"	2011	Asha ByBe
"Something to Dance For / TTYLXOX Mash-Up"	2012	Sanaa Hamri
"Fashion Is My Kryptonite"	2012	Marc Klasfeld
"Contagious Love"	2013	Justin Francis
"Call It Whatever"	2014	Mickey Finnegan
"Burn So Bright"	2018	Unknown
"Bitch I'm Bella Thorne"	2018	Bella Thorne
"Goat"	2018	Bella Thorne
"Pussy Mine"	2018	Bella Thorne
"Lonely"	2020	Bella Thorne
"SFB"	2020	Bella Thorne
"Shake It"	2021	Bella Thorne
"Phantom"	2021	Bella Thorne
"Up In Flames"	2021	Unknown
"In You"	2021	Bella Thorne

As featured artist
Title	Year	Main artist	Director
"Can't Stay Away"	2013	IM5	Walid Azami
"Just Call"	2017	Prince Fox	Joe Zohar
"Salad Dressing"	2017	Borgore	Jack Craymer
"Clout 9"	2018	Lil Phag	Bella Thorne
"Do Not Disturb"	2019	Steve Aoki	Bella Thorne

As guest artist
Title	Year	Artist	Director
"Outta My Hair"	2017	Logan Paul	Eli Sokhn and Logan Paul
"Hefner"	2017	Tana Mongeau	Hunter Moreno
"Bedroom Floor"	2017	Liam Payne	Declan Whitebloom
"Address on the Internet"	2017	Mod Sun	Bella Thorne
"Habits"	2018	Com3t	Bella Thorne
"Trust Me"	2018	Bhad Bhabie featuring Ty Dolla $ign	Nicholaus Goossen
"Be Somebody's"	2020	Ava Caceres	Stephen Wayne Mallett
"Finché le stelle non brillano"	2021	Benjamin Mascolo	The Astronauts
"Cowboys Don't Cry"	2022	Oliver Tree	Oliver Tree
"Becky's So Hot"	2022	Fletcher	Milli Centhailes
