= Bella Thorne filmography =

American actress, singer, and director Bella Thorne has appeared in a variety of films, television shows, video games, and music videos throughout the duration of her career. Beginning her career in the film industry, Thorne has appeared in 35 films (including two documentaries and four films as a voice actor), three television films, and two short films. Additionally, she has directed one film and executive produced another.

Thorne has had leading roles on several television shows including My Own Worst Enemy (2008), Little Monk (2009), Big Love (2010), Shake It Up (2010–2013), and Famous in Love (2017–2018).

Outside of film and television, Thorne has lent her voice to three video games, appeared in one stage play, and directed a series of music videos for herself and other musicians.

== Film ==
Year	Title	Role	Notes
2003	Stuck on You	MC Sideline	
2007	Finishing the Game	Sue	
2007	Blind Ambition	Annabella	
2007	The Seer	Young Claire Sue	
2009	Forget Me Not	Young Angela	
2010	My Day. My Life	Herself	Documentary
2010	One Wish	The Messenger	
2010	Raspberry Magic	Sarah Patterson	
2012	Katy Perry: Part of Me	Herself	Documentary
2013	Metegol	Young Laura	Voice role; English dub
2013	The Frog Kingdom	Princess Froglegs	Voice role; English dub
2014	Blended	Hilary "Larry" Friedman	
2014	Alexander and the Terrible, Horrible, No Good, Very Bad Day	Celia Rodriguez	
2014	The Snow Queen 2	Gerda	Voice role; English dub
2015	The DUFF	Madison Morgan	
2015	Big Sky	Hazel	
2015	Alvin and the Chipmunks: The Road Chip	Ashley Grey	
2015	Little Door Gods	Rain	Voice role; English dub
2016	Shovel Buddies	Kate	Also executive producer
2016	Ratchet & Clank	Cora Veralux	Voice role
2016	Boo! A Madea Halloween	Rain Mathison	
2017	Keep Watching	Jamie Miller	
2017	You Get Me	Holly Viola	Also executive producer
2017	Amityville: The Awakening	Belle Walker	
2017	The Babysitter	Allison	
2018	Assassination Nation	Reagan Hall	
2018	Midnight Sun	Katie Price	
2018	Ride	Jessica	Also executive producer
2018	I Still See You	Ronnie Calder	
2019	Her & Him	—N/a	Short film Director, producer and writer
2020	Infamous	Arielle Summers	Also executive producer
2020	The Babysitter: Killer Queen	Allison	
2020	Chick Fight	Olivia	Also executive producer
2020	Girl	Girl	
2021	Masquerade	Rose / adult Casey	
2021	Habit	Mads	Also producer
2021	Time Is Up	Vivien	
2022	Measure of Revenge	Taz	
2022	Game of Love	Vivien	
2023	Divinity	Ziva	
2023	Rumble Through the Dark	Annette	
2024	Saint Clare	Clare Bleecker	Also executive producer
2024	The Trainer	Elektra	
2025	Find Your Friends	Lavinia	

== Television ==
Year	Title	Role	Notes
2006	Entourage	Kid	Episode: "I Wanna Be Sedated"
2007	The O.C.	Young Taylor Townsend	Episode: "The Case of the Franks"
2007–2008	Dirty Sexy Money	Margaux Darling	Recurring role (season 2)
2008	October Road	Angela Ferilli	Episode: "Stand Alone by Me"
2008	My Own Worst Enemy	Ruthy Spivey	Main role
2009	Little Monk	Wendy	Main role
2009	In the Motherhood	Annie	Episode: "Practice What You Preach"
2009	Mental	Emily	Episode: "Pilot"
2010	Big Love	Tancy "Teenie" Henrickson	Main role (season 4)
2010	Wizards of Waverly Place	Nancy Lukey	Episode: "Max's Secret Girlfriend"
2010–2013	Shake It Up	CeCe Jones	Co-lead role
2011	Good Luck Charlie	CeCe Jones	Episode: "Charlie Shakes It Up"
2011	Disney's Friends for Change Games	Herself	Contestant; 5 episodes
2012	Frenemies	Avalon Greene	Television film
2014	Phineas and Ferb	Brigitte	Voice role; episode: "Night of the Living Pharmacists"
2014	CSI: Crime Scene Investigation	Hannah Hunt	Episode: "The Book of Shadows"
2014	Red Band Society	Delaney Shaw	Episodes: "How Did We Get Here?", "What I Did For Love"
2014	Mostly Ghostly: Have You Met My Ghoulfriend?	Cammy Cahill	Television film
2015	K.C. Undercover	Jolie	Episode: "Spy-Anoia Will Destroy Ya"
2015	Perfect High	Amanda	Television film
2015	Scream	Nina Patterson	Episodes: “Pilot”, "The Dance"
2017–2018	Famous in Love	Paige Townsen	Main role
2018	Conrad & Michelle: If Words Could Kill	Michelle Carter	Television film
2019	Speechless	Cassidy	Episode: "P-r-o-m-p-Promposal"
2019	Tales	Janelle	Episode: "XO Tour Lif3"
2020	Robot Chicken	Jean Grey / Nermal	Voice role; episode: "Max Caenen in..."
2020	The Masked Singer	Herself / The Swan	Contestant (season 3)
2021	Paradise City	Lily Mayflower	Main role
2022	American Horror Stories	Marci	Episode: "Drive"

== Video games ==
Year	Title	Role	Notes
2006	The Ant Bully	Ant Kid	
2016	Marvel Avengers Academy	Greer Grant / Tigra	
2016	Ratchet & Clank	Cora Veralux	

== Music videos ==
Music video appearances
Title	Year	Artist(s)	Role	Director
"Outta My Hair"	2017	Logan Paul	Herself	No
"Hefner"	2017	Tana Mongeau	Angel	No
"Bedroom Floor"	2017	Liam Payne	Love interest	No
"Address on the Internet"	2017	Mod Sun	Mrs. Claus	Yes
"Clout 9" (featuring Bella Thorne, Tana Mongeau, and Dr. Woke)	2018	Lil Phag	Herself	Yes
"B*tch I’m Bella Thorne"	2018	Bella Thorne	Herself	Yes
"Goat"	2018	Bella Thorne	Herself	Yes
"Pussy Mine"	2018	Bella Thorne	Herself	Yes
"Habits"	2018	Com3t	—N/a	Yes
"Do Not Disturb" (featuring Bella Thorne)	2019	Steve Aoki	Herself	Yes
"Be Somebody's"	2020	Ava Caceres	Herself	Yes
"No Service in the Hills" (featuring Trippie Redd, Blackbear and Prince$$ Rosie)	2020	Cheat Codes	—N/a	Yes
"Cowboys Don't Cry" (featuring Eva Gutowski)	2022	Oliver Tree	—N/a	Yes

=== Theater ===
Year	Title	Role	Venue	Ref.
2015	New York Spring Spectacular	Alice statue (voice-over)	Radio City Music Hall	
