= Shake It Up: Live 2 Dance =

Soundtrack album by Various artists
- Released: March 20, 2012
- Genre: Dance-pop
- Length: 39:32
- Label: Walt Disney

Singles from Shake It Up: Live 2 Dance
- 1. "TTYLXOX" Released: March 6, 2012; 2. "Something to Dance For" Released: March 6, 2012

Shake It Up: Live 2 Dance is the second soundtrack for the Disney Channel Original Series Shake It Up. It was released on March 20, 2012. The soundtrack lists songs featured on the show's second season (2011–2012).

== Background ==
All of the songs were available for listening during the Radio Disney Planet Premiere held three days prior to the soundtrack's release and on RadioDisney.com, excluding The Deluxe Edition bonus tracks, and the Target exclusive tracks (with the exception of "The Star I R," which was played On-Air that day). It sold 210,000 copies in the US in 2012, and was the best-selling TV soundtrack of the year.

== Critical reception ==
Heather Phares of AllMusic gave a review: "The soundtrack to the Disney Channel's show Shake It Up, about two girls who finally get a chance to live their dreams of being professional dancers, is as foot-tapping as its subtitle, Live 2 Dance, suggests. The dance-pop set features Bella Thorne's text-speak hit "TTYLXOX," Blush's driving "Up Up and Away," and Amber Lily's Ke$ha-esque "Turn It On," along with tracks by Zendaya, Coco Jones, Adam Hicks and Adam Trent."

== Singles ==
"Up, Up and Away" by Blush was released as the first promotional single on February 14, 2012.

"TTYLXOX" by Bella Thorne and "Something to Dance For" by Zendaya were released as dual lead singles on March 6, 2012.

== Track listing ==
No.	Title	Writer(s)	Produced by	Length
1.	"Whodunit" (Adam Hicks and Coco Jones)	Lambert Waldrip; Justin Mobley; Anya Vasilenko	Lambert "Stereo" Waldrip	2:19
2.	"TTYLXOX" (Bella Thorne)	Jeannie Lurie; Aris Archontis; Chen Neeman	Lurie; Archontis; Neeman; Braxton Langston-Chapman	2:33
3.	"Something to Dance For" (Zendaya)	Lurie; Archontis; Neeman	Lurie; Archontis; Neeman	2:42
4.	"Up, Up and Away" (Blush)	Niclas Molinder; Joacim Persson; Johan Alkenas; Jacqueline M. Cumming	Twin; Alke	3:01
5.	"Show Ya How" (Adam Irigoyen and Kenton Duty)	Ben Charles; Max Schneider	Charles	2:21
6.	"Make Your Mark" (Drew Ryan Scott)	Molinder; Persson; Alkenas; Drew Ryan Scott	Twin; Alke	3:38
7.	"Don't Push Me" (Coco Jones)	Charles	Charles	2:40
8.	"Turn It On" (Amber Lily)	Charles; Tony Ghantous	Charles; Ghantous	2:37
9.	"Moves Like Magic" (Adam Trent)	Lurie; Archontis; Neeman	Lurie; Archontis; Neeman	2:49
10.	"Critical" (TKO and Nevermind)	Tim James; Antonina Armato; Adam Schmalholz; Devrim Karaoglu	Rock Mafia	3:03
11.	"Bring the Fire" (Ylwa)	Molinder; Persson; Jonas Thander; Scott	Twin	3:04
12.	"Where's the Party" (Jenilee Reyes)	Mitch Allan; Kevin Kadish; Eva Simons	Allan; Kadish	2:57
13.	"Surprise" (TKO, Nevermind and SOS)	James; Armato; Schmalholz; Jon Vella; Thomas Armato Sturges	Rock Mafia	2:59
14.	"Something to Dance For/TTYLXOX Mash-Up" (Zendaya and Bella Thorne)	Lurie; Archontis; Neeman	Lurie; Archontis; Neeman	2:45
Total length:				39:32

Digital deluxe edition bonus tracks
No.	Title	Writer(s)	Length
15.	"Edge of the Mirror" (Emme Rose)	Charles; Aaron Harmon; Jim Wes	2:48
16.	"Total Access" (TKO, Nevermind and SOS)	Armato; James; Vella; Sturges; Nevermind	3:02
Total length:			45:18

International bonus tracks
No.	Title	Writer(s)	Produced by	Length
15.	"Watch Me" (Bella Thorne and Zendaya)	Charles; Aaron Harmon; Jim Wes	Charles; Harmon; Wes	2:55
16.	"Shake It Up" (Selena Gomez)	Lurie; Archontis; Neeman	Lurie; Archontis; Neeman	2:55
Total length:				45:18

US Target and Japanese edition bonus tracks
No.	Title	Writer(s)	Produced by	Length
15.	"The Star I R" (Caroline Sunshine)	James; Armato; Karaoglu; Schmalholz	Rock Mafia	3:31
16.	"Overtime" (Robyn Newman)	Matthew Tishler; Andrew Ang	Tishler	3:27
17.	"A Space in the Stars" (Drew Seeley)	Lurie; Archontis; Neeman	Lurie; Archontis; Neeman	2:55
Total length:				49:23

Walmart deluxe edition bonus tracks
No.	Title	Writer(s)	Length
15.	"Fashion Is My Kryptonite" (Bella Thorne and Zendaya)	Charles	2:44
16.	"The Same Heart" (Zendaya and Bella Thorne)	Toby Gad; Lindy Robbins	3:37
17.	"Made in Japan" (Bella Thorne and Zendaya)	Molinder; Persson; Alkenas; Charlie Mason	2:58
18.	"Where's the Party/Don't Push Me/Show Ya How" (Dave Audé Medley) (Jenilee Reyes, Coco Jones, Adam Irigoyen and Kenton Duty)	Mitch Allan; Kevin Kadish; Eva Simons; Charles; Max Schneider	2:16
19.	"TTYLXOX (The Sophomore Remix)" (Bella Thorne)	Lurie; Archontis; Neeman	3:50
Total length:			54:53

== Charts ==
=== Weekly charts ===
Chart (2012)	Peak position
Spanish Albums (Promusicae)	8
French Albums (SNEP)	191
Portuguese Albums (AFP)	16
US Billboard 200	13
US Kid Albums (Billboard)	1
US Soundtrack Albums (Billboard)	2

=== Year-end charts ===
Chart (2012)	Position
US Billboard 200	162
US Soundtrack Albums (Billboard)	8
