= Call It Whatever =

Call It Whatever may refer to:

- Call It Whatever (album)
- "Call It Whatever" (song)
