= Something to Dance For =

2012 single by Zendaya

Single by Zendaya

from the album Shake It Up: Live 2 Dance
- Released: March 6, 2012
- Recorded: 2011
- Genre: Electropop
- Length: 2:43
- Label: Walt Disney
- Songwriters: Jeannie Lurie; Aris Archontis; Chen Neeman
- Producers: Jeannie Lurie; Aris Archontis; Chen Neeman

Zendaya singles chronology
"Watch Me" (2011)	"Something to Dance For" (2012)	"Fashion Is My Kryptonite" (2012)

"Something to Dance For" is a song sung by American singer and actress Zendaya for the soundtrack Shake It Up: Live 2 Dance. The song was written and produced by Jeannie Lurie, Aris Archontis and Chen Neeman. It was released as a single on March 6, 2012.

== Background ==
The song was composed by Jeannie Lurie, Aris Archontis and Chen Neeman, known to form the same partnership to compose songs like "And The Crowd Goes" by Chris Brochu, for the soundtrack of Lemonade Mouth, "So Far, So Great" and "What to Do" by Demi Lovato for the album Here We Go Again and for the soundtrack Sonny with a Chance, "Shake It Up" by Selena Gomez, for the soundtrack Shake It Up: Break It Down. On December 3, 2011, a video in low quality was planned for a future episode of Shake It Up for the 2012 season, began to spread through the internet, which brought a small preview of the song a little over a minute. On March 6, finally, the song was officially released as a single on iTunes.

== Music video ==
The video was released on March 9, 2012. It was a mash-up video with "TTYLXOX". It starts with the girls' request for each other's song and then Zendaya starts to sing and dance with a group of people, then "TTYLXOX" plays with Bella Thorne dancing and singing with her group, and then finally the songs mash-up with both Zendaya and Thorne singing their songs and dancing together.

== Track listings ==
- U.S. / Digital download
1. "Something to Dance For" – 3:19
- U.S. / Mash-Up download
1. "Something to Dance For / TTYLXOX – Mash Up" (with Bella Thorne)

== Charts ==
Chart performance for "Something to Dance For"
Chart (2012)	Peak position
US Bubbling Under Hot 100 (Billboard)	24

== Release history ==
Release history and formats for "Something to Dance For"
Country	Date	Format	Label
United States	March 6, 2012	Digital download	Walt Disney
