= Shake It Up: I Love Dance =

Soundtrack album by Various artists
- Released: March 5, 2013
- Recorded: 2012–2013
- Genres: Dance-pop; hip hop
- Length: 36:29
- Label: Walt Disney

Singles from Shake It Up: I Love Dance
- 1. "Contagious Love" Released: February 14, 2013

Shake It Up: I Love Dance (stylized as Shake It Up: I <3 Dance, also known as Shake It Up: I ♥ Dance) is the third and final soundtrack for the Disney Channel Original Series Shake It Up. It was released on March 5, 2013. The soundtrack is based on songs featured on the show's third (and final) season (2012–2013). The album features musical artists associated with or popularized by Disney Channel: Bella Thorne, Zendaya, Bridgit Mendler, McClain Sisters, Caroline Sunshine, Roshon Fegan, Selena Gomez, Coco Jones, Olivia Holt, Drew Seeley, and Dove Cameron, as well as non-Disney Channel artists YLA, TKO, SOS, and Nevermind.

== Critical reception ==
Professional ratings
Review scores
Source	Rating
AllMusic	3.5/5 stars

Heather Phares of AllMusic gave a review: "The soundtrack to the third season of the Disney Channel series Shake It Up. I Heart Dance features more hip-hop-tinged dance pop, CeCe Jones (Bella Throne) and Rocky Blue (Zendaya) sing and dance as backup dancers on Shake It Up, Chicago. Highlights include Thorne and Zendaya's fizzy duet "This is My Dance Floor", Zendaya's energetic "Beat of My Drum", Dove Cameron's "Future Sounds Like Us" and Olivia Holt's "These Boots Are Made for Walkin". Tracks by Selena Gomez, Coco Jones and Bridgit Mendler round out a collection sure to get the Radio Disney set moving".

== Commercial performance ==
The soundtrack reached number 26 in the Billboard 200 in the U.S. as well as the Kid Albums at number one and the Top Soundtracks at number two. The album was the eighth best-selling soundtrack album of 2013, with 134,000 copies sold in the United States. In Spain, it reached at number 23 in the chart.

"This Is My Dance Floor", performed by Thorne and Zendaya, peaked at number two on Billboard Kid Digital Songs. "Blow the System", performed by Thorne, reached at twenty. "Contagious Love", performed by Thorne and Zendaya, peaked at two. "These Boots Are Made for Walkin'", performed by Olivia Holt, reached number six. "Beat of My Drum", performed by Zendaya, peaked at eight.

== Track listing ==
No.	Title	Writer(s)	Performed by	Length
1.	"Contagious Love"	Lambert Waldrip; Miranda R. Johnson; Anya Vasilenko	Zendaya and Bella Thorne	2:15
2.	"This Is My Dance Floor"	Aris Archontis; Chen Neeman; Jeannie Lurie	Bella Thorne and Zendaya	3:09
3.	"Beat of My Drum"	Jay L'Oreal; James J. Abrabart; Melvin Hough II; Rivelino R. Wouter	Zendaya	3:16
4.	"Blow the System"	David Dawood; Natalia Hajjara; Darryl Connell; Philippe-Marc Anquetil	Bella Thorne	3:30
5.	"Afterparty"	Bardur Haberg; Scott Krippayne	Roshon Fegan and Caroline Sunshine	2:43
6.	"Holla at the DJ" (The DJ Mike D Mix)	Makeba Riddick; Brian Kennedy; LaShawn Daniels	Coco Jones	3:25
7.	"These Boots Are Made for Walkin'"	Lee Hazlewood	Olivia Holt	2:22
8.	"Sharp as a Razor"	Niclas Molinder; Joacim Persson; Johan Alkenäs; Charlie Mason	McClain Sisters	3:15
9.	"Future Sounds Like Us"	Bardur Haberg; Oli Jogvansson; Michelle Lewis; Heidi Rojas	Dove Cameron	2:57
10.	"I Can Do Better"	Tim James; Antonina Armato; Adam Smeaton	YLA	2:34
11.	"Shake It Up" (Cole Plante Reboot Remix)	Jeannie Lurie; Aris Archontis; Chen Neeman	Selena Gomez	3:32
12.	"We're Dancing" (Alex Ghenea 3.0 Remix) (bonus track)	Bridgit Mendler; Josh Alexander; Billy Steinberg	Bridgit Mendler	3:21
Total length:				36:19

United States Walmart edition bonus tracks
No.	Title	Writer(s)	Performed by	Length
13.	"Get'cha Head in the Game"	Ray Cham; Greg Cham; Andrew Seeley	Bella Thorne	2:40
14.	"I Do"	Dan Book; Alexei Misoul	Drew Seeley	3:42
Total length:				42:41

United States Target bonus tracks
No.	Title	Writer(s)	Performed by	Length
13.	"I'm Back"	Ben Charles	Zendaya	2:26
14.	"Freaky Freakend"	Lambert Waldrip; Miranda R. Johnson	Coco Jones	2:35
15.	"Law of Averages"	Antonina Armato; Tim James; Adam Smeaton; Adam Schmalhoz	TKO and Nevermind	2:43
Total length:				44:03

Japan edition bonus tracks
No.	Title	Writer(s)	Performed by	Length
13.	"I'm Back"	Ben Charles	Zendaya	2:26
14.	"Get'cha Head in the Game"	Ray Cham; Greg Cham; Andrew Seeley	Bella Thorne	2:40
15.	"Freaky Freakend"	Lambert Waldrip; Miranda R. Johnson	Coco Jones	2:35
Total length:				44:00

International edition bonus tracks
No.	Title	Writer(s)	Performed by	Length
13.	"I'm Back"	Ben Charles	Zendaya	2:26
14.	"Get'cha Head in the Game"	Ray Cham; Greg Cham; Andrew Seeley	Bella Thorne	2:40
15.	"Freaky Freakend"	Lambert Waldrip; Miranda R. Johnson	Coco Jones	2:35
16.	"I Do"	Dan Book; Alexei Misoul	Drew Seeley	3:42
17.	"Law of Averages"	Antonina Armato; Tim James; Adam Smeaton; Adam Schmalhoz	TKO and Nevermind	2:43
Total length:				50:25

== Charts ==
=== Weekly charts ===
Chart (2013)	Peak position
Spanish Albums (Promusicae)	23
US Billboard 200	26
US Kid Albums (Billboard)	1
US Soundtrack Albums (Billboard)	2

=== Year-end charts ===
Chart (2013)	Position
US Soundtrack Albums (Billboard)	9

== Release history ==
Country	Date	Format	Label
United States	March 5, 2013	Standard	Walt Disney
Brazil	June 26, 2013	Standard	Walt Disney
