= Fashion Is My Kryptonite =

Single by Bella Throne and Zendaya

Single by Bella Thorne and Zendaya

from the album Made in Japan
- Released: July 20, 2012
- Recorded: 2012
- Genre: EDM; J-pop; pop rap
- Length: 2:34
- Label: Walt Disney
- Songwriter: Ben Charles

Bella Thorne singles chronology
"TTYLXOX" (2012)	"Fashion Is My Kryptonite" (2012)	"Contagious Love" (2013)

Zendaya singles chronology
"Something to Dance For" (2012)	"Fashion Is My Kryptonite" (2012)	"Contagious Love" (2013)

"Fashion Is My Kryptonite" is a song by American singers and actresses Bella Thorne and Zendaya, from their debut collaborative extended play (EP), Made in Japan. It was released as single on iTunes on July 20, 2012.

== Live performances ==
The song was performed during the double episode of Shake It Up, also named "Made in Japan". The performances reached 4.5 million views. Thorne and Zendaya performed this song in Disney Channel's television special Make Your Mark. Zendaya performed this song without Thorne in her 16th birthday party. She also included the song in the setlist of her debut tour, Swag It Out Tour.

== Commercial reception ==
"Fashion is My Kryptonite" peaked at number two on Billboard Kid Digital Songs.

== Music video ==
The video was directed by Marc Klasfeld. The music video for this song, which features Cat Deeley, was released August 3, 2012 on the Disney Channel during Toy Story 3. Hours later it appeared on the official Disney Music VEVO account on YouTube.

== Awards and nominations ==
Title	Year	Category	Result	Ref.
Radio Disney Music Awards	2013	Best Music Video	Nominated	

== Chart performance ==
Chart (2012)	Peak position
US Kid Digital Songs (Billboard)	2

== Release history ==
Country	Date	Format	Label
United States	July 20, 2012	Digital download	Walt Disney
