= Bárður Háberg =

Faroese songwriter, producer and multi-instrumentalist

Bárður Háberg (born 1979; also spelled Bardur Haberg) is a Faroese songwriter, producer and multi-instrumentalist. He is one of two owners of the songwriting/production company Baroli Music. Together they write and produce songs for singers from all around the world. The other owner of Baroli Music is Óli Jógvansson. In 2012 their songs had sold 1 million copies worldwide.

Háberg was born in Tórshavn, Faroe Islands. He and Jógvansson have, along with two other songwriters, composed the music for the Disney TV-series Liv and Maddie. He is also credited with two songs on the Shake It Up: I Love Dance album, which is the third and final soundtrack for the Disney Channel Original Series Shake It Up, the songs are: "Future Sounds Like Us" and "Afterparty". The album charted as number 26 on Billboard 200 and number one on the U.S. Kid Albums (Billboard) In March 2014 Baroli Music was honoured with the Faroese Music Award.

== Musical career ==
Háberg is a multi-instrumentalist and started his musical career already as a child. He has been in several bands in the Faroe Islands and has performed as a freelance musician with various singers. Now he is mostly active in composing and producing music for the international market. His music has been released in countries such as United States, Japan, Netherlands, Taiwan, Brazil and Italy.

=== Baroli Music ===
Bárður Háberg and Óli Jógvansson started Baroli Music in 2006. They both live in the capital of the Faroe Islands and collaborate with various internationally successful companies such as Universal Music, The Kennel Publishing/Universal Music Publishing (with whom they had an exclusive songwriting contract between 2010 and 2012), Avex, Sony and Phrased Differently.

=== Discography ===
Some of the songs, which Bárður Háberg has composed and/or produced:

- 2021: "The Rumor" - co-written/co-produced/instrumentation. Released by group Billlie on South Korean label Mystic Story (SM Entertainment sub-label).
- 2020: "Kamikaze" - co-written/co-produced/instrumentation. Released by DJ Jimmy Clash on Metanoia Music.
- 2019: "Never Wanna Let You Go" - co-written/vocal production/instrumentation. Performed by Kill The Buzz, Jimmy Clash feat. vocals by Van Jay. Released by DJ Nicky Romero's label Protocol Recordings.
- 2017: "Forget" - co-written. Performed by "The Voice of Israel" winner LINA on the entire UK "Glory Days" Tour by Little Mix.
- 2015: I Like The Way – co-written/produced. On the EP "Dear Santa" by Girls' Generation-TTS which reached the #4 spot on Billboard's "US World Albums" chart and #2 on the main official album chart (Gaon) in South Korea.
- 2015: It – co-written/produced. On the Japan #1 (and Global #2!) album "Genic" by Namie Amuro. The album sold 160,000 copies (CDs) within its first week of release and has since been certified Platinum in Japan for sales of over 250,000.
- 2015: Take It From The Top – co-written/produced/mixed. Performed by Ross Lynch and released by Walt Disney Records. The song is in Season 4 of Disney Channel series Austin & Ally and is also the title track of the soundtrack EP for the season.
- 2014: Agape – co-written. Single by Chinese singer Zhang Liyin released by major South Korean label S.M. Entertainment. Within a couple of days after release the song rose to the Top 10 on Baidu's "King" chart and has reached #3 as of 5 August 2014.
- 2014: Track produced/co-written for a Samsung ad campaign in the UK.
- 2014: Money in My Bag – co-written/produced. Single by Kumi Koda and included on her Japan #1 album "Walk of My Life" (2015).
- 2014: LOL – co-written/produced. On the Japan #1 album "Bon Voyage" by Japanese artist Kumi Koda.
- 2014: Better in Stereo (full length theme song version) – co-written/produced. The song is performed by Dove Cameron and included on the Disney Channel: Play It Loud! album released by Walt Disney Records.
- 2013: Better Off – co-written. On album "Misconceptions of Us" by SHINee (#4 on Korean album chart)
- 2013: Theme song for worldwide Disney Channel series Liv and Maddie (co-written/produced). A full version of the song (titled "Better in Stereo") was also released. The music video for the song was released on Disney's VEVO YouTube channel (7 million views as of March 2014) and aired on Disney Channel for about 3 months. The song also reached #4 on the US "Soundtrack" iTunes chart and was #1 on the "Kid Digital" Billboard chart for 3 consecutive weeks (it has spent a total of 23 weeks on that chart as of 1 April 2014).
- 2013: Afterparty – co-written/produced/mixed. The song is performed by Caroline Sunshine and Roshon Fegan and is included on the Shake It Up: I Love Dance soundtrack album released by Walt Disney Records (USA). (#26 on Billboard 200)
- 2013: Future Sounds Like Us – co-written and produced. Performed by Dove Cameron and released on the Shake It Up: I Love Dance soundtrack album (Walt Disney Records). (#26 on Billboard 200)
- 2013: Wake Me Up – co-written. The song is on the Japan #1 album Love Again by Japanese popstar Ayumi Hamasaki.
- 2012: Enough is Enough – co-written with Sam McCarthy. On Taiwanese singer Elva Hsiao's #1 album (Taiwan) Super Girl.
- 2012: A New Low – co-written. On the album "First" by The Voice of Holland winner Iris Kroes. The album reached #4 on the official weekly charts in the Netherlands.
- 2012: Wake Me Up – co-written. The song is on the EP "Again" by Japanese popstar Ayumi Hamasaki (#7 on Japanese weekly charts).
- 2012: So Nice – co-written and produced. The song is on the album Japonesque (and released as digital single), by the Japanese female singer Kumi Koda. The album was released in January 2012 and reached #1 on the Japanese Oricon weekly chart in its first week of release (and #2 Globally). It has sold more than 150,000 copies as of December 2012.
- 2012: Lovely – co-written. Digital single with The Voice of Korea finalist Woo Hye Mi.
- 2011: Enough is Enough – co-written with Sam McCarthy. On Taiwanese singer Elva Hsiao's #1 album (Taiwan) I'm Ready.
- 2011: High – co-written. On Brazil Top 10 album DNA by Brazilian female singer Wanessa, released in July 2011 by Sony Music Entertainment.
- 2011: I Like It (EP) – co-written/produced. The first mini album by the South Korean idol group ChoColat. The mini-album was released on 15 December 2011 under Universal Music and Paramount Music Entertainment.

== Honours ==
- 2014 – Faroese Music Awards in the category Best Producers together with Óli Jógvansson
