= Made in Japan (EP) =

EP / soundtrack by Bella Thorne and Zendaya
- Released: August 21, 2012
- Recorded: 2012
- Length: 9:24
- Label: Walt Disney
- Producer: Ben Charles

Bella Thorne albums chronology
Made in Japan (2012)	Jersey (2014)

Zendaya albums chronology
Made in Japan (2012)	Zendaya (2013)

Singles from Made in Japan
- 1. "Fashion Is My Kryptonite" Released: July 20, 2012

Made in Japan is the debut extended play and soundtrack by American actresses and singers Bella Thorne and Zendaya. The album was released on August 21, 2012, by Walt Disney. "Fashion Is My Kryptonite" was released as a single on July 20, 2012.

== Promotion ==
On August 3, Disney Channel premiere the music video of "Fashion Is My Kryptonite". The song was also included in the Walmart deluxe edition of Shake It Up: Live 2 Dance soundtrack. On August 4, Thorne and Zendaya were interviewed by Radio Disney and talked about the production of the EP. "Fashion Is My Kryptonite", "Made in Japan" and "The Same Heart" were performed during the double episode of Shake It Up, also named Made in Japan. The performances reached 4.5 million views.

== Commercial reception ==
All the songs peaked at Billboard Kid Digital Songs. "Fashion Is My Kryptonite" reached number two, "Made in Japan" peaked at number three, and "The Same Heart" reached number four.

== Track listing ==
All tracks are written by shake it up Made in Japan.

No.	Title	Writer(s)	Length
1.	"Fashion Is My Kryptonite"	Chen Neeman	2:44
2.	"The Same Heart"	* Chen Neeman	3:34
3.	"Made in Japan"	Neeman	2:56

Digital store edition
No.	Title	Length
4.	"Fashion Is My Kryptonite" (music video)	2:33

== Release history ==
Country	Date	Format	Label
United States	August 21, 2012	Digital download	Walt Disney
Canada	August 21, 2012	Digital download	Walt Disney
United Kingdom	September 7, 2012	Digital download	Walt Disney
