= Contagious Love =

Single by Zendaya and Bella Throne

Single by Zendaya and Bella Thorne

from the album Shake It Up: I Love Dance
- Released: February 14, 2013
- Recorded: 2012
- Genre: Old-school hip hop
- Length: 2:34
- Label: Walt Disney
- Songwriters: Miranda R. Johnson; Anna Vasilenko; Lambert Waldrip

Zendaya singles chronology
"Fashion Is My Kryptonite" (2012)	"Contagious Love" (2013)	"Replay" (2013)

Bella Thorne singles chronology
"Fashion Is My Kryptonite" (2012)	"Contagious Love" (2013)	"Call It Whatever" (2014)

"Contagious Love" is a song by American singers and actresses Bella Thorne and Zendaya, included on the soundtrack album Shake It Up: I Love Dance. It was released as a single on February 14, 2013 in United States and February 19, 2013 worldwide.

== Critical reception ==
Victoria V. of Verily Victoria Vocalises said the song was "catchy and dancy without being patronising" and that people would be hooked by the melody. She also commented that "Its sweet harmonies and catch chorus echo the song’s universal message about living life to the fullest". The Trips from the Disney said the song was "upbeat & fun", a "jam packed full of energy and zest for life and is sure to get your kids up & busting their moves" and "catchy hooks and rap sections with synths used to great effect".

== Commercial reception ==
"Contagious Love" peaked at number one on Billboard Kid Digital Songs on April 13, 2013.

== Live performances ==
The song was performed on April 28, 2013 during the episode of Shake It Up, "Love and War It Up". On February 14, Thorne and Zendaya released and performed the song on Radio Disney.

== Music video ==
The video was directed by Marc Klasfeld. The music video for this song was released on March 1, 2013 on Disney Channel and hours later on the official Disney Music Vevo account on YouTube.

== Chart performance ==
Chart (2013)	Peak position
US Kid Digital Songs (Billboard)	1

== Release history ==
Country	Date	Format	Label
United States	February 14, 2013	Digital download	Walt Disney
Austria	February 19, 2013	Digital download	Walt Disney
France	February 19, 2013	Digital download	Walt Disney
Italy	February 19, 2013	Digital download	Walt Disney
Netherlands	February 19, 2013	Digital download	Walt Disney
Russia	February 19, 2013	Digital download	Walt Disney
United Kingdom	February 19, 2013	Digital download	Walt Disney
Brazil	May 14, 2013	Digital download	Walt Disney
