= Measure of Revenge =

2022 film by Peyfa

- Theatrical release poster
- Directed by: Peyfa
- Produced by: Jen Gatien; Peter Wong; Timur Bekbosunov
- Starring: Melissa Leo; Bella Thorne; Jake Weary; Kevin Corrigan; Benedict Samuel; Adrian Martinez
- Cinematography: Bianca Butti
- Edited by: Peter Wong; Edmund Carson
- Music by: Nick Urata
- Production companies: ACE Pictures; DeerJen Productions
- Distributed by: Vertical Entertainment
- Release date: March 18, 2022
- Running time: 92 minutes
- Country: United States
- Language: English

Measure of Revenge, also known as Leave Not One Alive, is a 2022 American psychological thriller film directed by Peyfa and written by Kenny Walakandou. The film stars Melissa Leo, Bella Thorne, Jake Weary, Kevin Corrigan, Benedict Samuel, and Adrian Martinez. It follows a theater actress whose son dies mysteriously.

== Synopsis ==
Broadway actress Lillian Cooper is making her final on-stage appearance when her famous son, Curtis, is found dead. When his death is ruled as an accidental overdose, a suspicious Lillian decides to take matters into her own hands. On a quest for answers, she strikes up an unlikely alliance with her son's drug dealer, Taz, setting in motion a bloody warpath to uncover the truth and punish those who killed her son.

== Cast ==
- Melissa Leo as Lillian Cooper
- Bella Thorne as Taz
- Jake Weary as Curtis Cooper
- Kevin Corrigan as Claude Felson
- Benedict Samuel as Ronin
- Adrian Martinez as Addison
- Ivan Martin as Billy
- Roma Maffia as Mona
- Jasmine Carmichael as Olivia Jones
- Annapurna Sriram as Zoe / Hamlette
- Michael Potts as Detective Eaton
- Jason A. Rodriguez as Stagehand
- Tristao Darius as Jackie
- Gemma Massot as Lady MacBeth
- Jamie Jackson as The Gardener
- Mod Sun as Lord MacBeth
- Oscar Pavlo as Load Dock Thug
- Booker Garrett as Buttercup
- DL Sams as Actress
- Eliza Gill as Blue Model

== Production ==
It was announced in September 2018 that Melissa Leo and Bella Thorne had been cast to star in Leave Not One Alive, alongside Jake Weary, Michael Potts, Benedict Samuel, Kevin Corrigan, and Adrian Martinez. It was also announced that the film would be written and directed by Jordan Galland, who was later replaced by a first-time director known as Peyfa. Jen Gatien produced with Peter Wong and Timur Bekbosunov for ACE Pictures Entertainment. The film's original score was composed by Nick Urata.

Principal photography took place in New York City, New York.

== Release ==
In October 2021, Blue Fox Entertainment acquired international distribution rights to Measure of Revenge. In February 2022, it was announced that Vertical Entertainment acquired North American distribution rights to the film and would release it in select theaters, on digital, and VOD on March 18, 2022.

== Reception ==
On the review aggregator website Rotten Tomatoes, 12% of 17 critics' reviews are positive, with an average rating of 2.3/10. Metacritic, which uses a weighted average, assigned the film a score of 30 out of 100, based on 5 critics, indicating "generally unfavorable" reviews.

Nadir Samara of Screen Rant gave the film two stars out of five, and said: "Though Measure of Revenge is not an excellent film, it does have some flare. […] The script is far from perfect but if one squints, there is occasional fun to be had." John Anderson of The Wall Street Journal commented that it "moves with too much trepidation—or too much style, one might say—for a convincing urban thriller. Director Peyfa's oblique approach to the narrative leads one astray." Michael Nordine of Variety called the film "a mess from start to finish" and wrote that Leo "does her utmost to make it work, but there's simply nothing here to save." Nordine criticized it for "the washed-out, smartphone-esque cinematography and incoherent screenplay, neither of which are done any favors by a series of jarring edits." John Serba of Decider opined that "Measure of Revenge is like Death Wish if it sucked and didn't always make sense" and "Leo normally is the type of actress who can find at least a nugget of credibility in a bad movie, but the odds are really stacked against her here." Alex Saveliev of Film Threat wrote that the film "stuffs a lot into a 90-minute narrative, and the strain shows. The plot lurches from one awkwardly-staged, heavy-handed, poorly-lit, bathed in eye-scorching soft-focus sequence to another with little regard for tonal shifts or narrative fluidity." Saveliev concluded by stating: "For a film that deals with a mother's child passing, Measure of Revenge is depressing for all the wrong reasons. […] Maybe it's best for Peyfa to remain in the shadows for a while. The cinematic world may not be for him." Martha K. Baker of KDHX radio, was positive about the film, praising it for "masterful use of flashbacks, in particular scenes from Lillian's famous roles, in The Scarlet Letter and Hamlet, for example, with allusions to literature that include Edgar Allan Poe. Lines from the plays spider in and out of Lillian's mind. "Measure of Revenge" almost demands a second viewing to catch all the lines and allusions."
