= Big Sky (film) =

- Theatrical release poster
- Directed by: Jorge Michel Grau
- Written by: Evan M. Wiener
- Produced by: Randy Manis; Christina Papagjika; Matthew Salloway
- Starring: Bella Thorne; Kyra Sedgwick; Frank Grillo; Aaron Tveit
- Cinematography: Santiago Sanchez
- Edited by: Erin Deck
- Music by: Ailinko Cona; Neil Harbisson
- Production companies: The Archive; Papagjika Salloway Productions
- Distributed by: Entertainment One
- Release date: August 14, 2015 (United States)
- Running time: 95 minutes
- Country: United States
- Language: English
- Budget: $7 million

Big Sky is a 2015 American drama thriller film directed by Jorge Michel Grau and starring Bella Thorne, Kyra Sedgwick, Frank Grillo, and Aaron Tveit. It was produced by The Archive and Papagjika Salloway Productions. Entertainment One gave it a limited release on August 14, 2015. The film received negative reviews from critics with criticism for the screenplay and Thorne's performance.

== Plot ==
After their daughter Hazel turns 18, Dee's ex-husband threatens to cut off child support unless Hazel will get treatment for her crippling agoraphobia. Forced to take a van ride to the treatment center, Hazel struggles to enter the van. Though they have clashed over Dee's hard-living lifestyle and Hazel's neuroses, Hazel is comforted when her mother offers to come with her. To accommodate Hazel's fears, the treatment center allows her to travel in a box, where Hazel will be able to isolate herself from others and her environment.

While traveling through the desert, half-brothers Pru and Jesse attack the van to kidnap a wealthy heiress. Pru, mentally damaged from head trauma by his abusive mother, reacts erratically and shoots Dee. Although exasperated by the unnecessary violence, Jesse cleans up the scene of the crime by shooting everyone else but the heiress and Hazel, who remains hidden in her box. After Pru and Jesse leave, Hazel checks the others and finds her mother wounded but still alive. A map reveals a nearby reservation, which Hazel offers to travel to for help after applying first aid to Dee. After Hazel leaves, Dee finds a note written by Hazel that lists all the reasons why Hazel believes her mother to hate her.

Hazel slowly makes her way through the desert, forcing herself to concentrate on simple goals, such as reaching one cactus after another. Her pill-taking ritual is disturbed by the dusty weather, and she must abandon some of her pills when they become too dirty for her to put in her mouth. She hallucinates the ghost of her dead sister, who she was unable to save in a drowning accident. When Jesse learns from an inside contact that one of the patients is agoraphobic, he realizes that it could not have been Dee, whom he initially assumed was a patient. When he and Pru return to the van, they discover Hazel's empty box, and Jesse leaves to find her. Dee, who has located a pistol in the van, takes Pru hostage.

Meanwhile, Hazel runs into a junkie named Clete who quotes Aldous Huxley. Hazel eventually convinces Clete to help her, but his promised motorcycle turns out to have been disassembled. Despairing and not sure whether to further trust Clete as he begins to rant about women, Hazel pulls out pepper spray. Clete grabs it from her and in his craze pepper sprays himself, Hazel starts walking backwards away from him, trips on a rock and bumps her head. When Hazel wakes, she has been rescued by a kindly couple who found her just outside the reservation. They contact the police for her and offer to take her back to her mother.

On the trip, they meet a representative of the treatment center, who says he was dispatched to locate the missing van. He convinces Hazel to allow him to pick up her mother and bring them to the treatment center. Despite the representative's protestations, the kindly couple follow behind him, reasoning that they can help protect her with their rifles. All converge on Dee's location at approximately the same time, where she is still holding Pru at gunpoint. Jesse, revealed to be the local sheriff, attempts to take control of the situation, but Dee warns the others not to trust him. The representative attempts to parlay with Dee, but when he makes a move to attack her, the couple opens fire, killing him, Jesse, and Pru. Hazel rescues the kidnapped heiress and tearfully reconciles with her mother.

== Cast ==
- Bella Thorne as Hazel
- Kyra Sedgwick as Dee
- Frank Grillo as Jesse
- Aaron Tveit as Pruitt
- François Arnaud as Clete

== Production ==
Filming began in Albuquerque, New Mexico, in October 2013.

== Release ==
The film was released in the United States on August 14, 2015, by Entertainment One in a limited release and through video on demand.

== Reception ==
On the review aggregator website Rotten Tomatoes, 18% of 11 critics gave Big Sky a positive review, with an average rating of 4.3/10. Metacritic assigned the film a score of 36 out of 100 based on seven critics, indicating "generally unfavorable" reviews.

Dennis Harvey of Variety wrote, "Evan M. Wiener’s screenplay throws in too many disparate elements without developing any of them very effectively, while Grau’s direction is slick but unable to provide the tension or consistency needed." John DeFore of The Hollywood Reporter wrote that the film includes too many quirky characters, but Grau "captures [Thorne's] struggle with empathy and dignity". Andy Webster of The New York Times, although complimenting the other actors, said that Thorne is not ready to handle a lead role. Michael Rechtshaffen of the Los Angeles Times called it a "tedious waste of space" that seems to have been made up as the filmmakers went along.

== See also ==
- List of films featuring mental disorders: Agoraphobia
