= Raspberry Magic =

- Directed by: Leena Pendharkar
- Written by: Leena Pendharkar
- Produced by: Megha Kadakia
- Starring: Lily Javherpour; Bella Thorne; Meera Simhan; Ravi Kapoor; Maulik Pancholy
- Cinematography: Jeffrey Chu
- Music by: Jesse Clark
- Release date: February 24, 2010
- Running time: 82 minutes
- Country: United States
- Language: English

Raspberry Magic is a 2010 American independent drama film. Directed by Leena Pendharkar, produced by Megha Kadakia, it premiered at the Cinequest Film Festival. and the San Francisco International Asian American Film Festival

== Plot ==
A young girl, Monica Shah, believes that she can save her parents' marriage by winning the science fair. Her science project uses touch therapy to grow raspberries in a forest. She explores whether it is nature or nurture that can make them grow.

== Cast ==
- Lily Javaherpour as Monica Shah
- Bella Thorne as Sarah Patterson
- Meera Simhan as Nandini Shah
- Ravi Kapoor as Manoj Shah
- James Morrison as Henry Hooper
- Keya Shah as Gina Shah
- Alison Brie as Ms. Bradlee
- Maulik Pancholy as Amrish Patil
- Randall Batinkoff as Dylan
- Zach Mills as Zachary Dunlap
- Colter Allison as Cop

== Reception ==
Raspberry Magic received generally positive reviews during its festival screenings. Clinton Stark says that "Raspberry Magic delivers an inspired message about pursuing your dreams, recognizing and appreciating who you are, despite the day-to-day curve balls life might pitch at you," while the Raleigh, North Carolina News & Observer called it "a sweet little film that without adornment in style or storytelling evokes the nature of family drama and family love."

== Awards ==
- Audience Award, Best Narrative Feature, Philadelphia Asian American Film Festival
