= Her & Him =

2019 adult film

- Film poster
- Directed by: Bella Thorne
- Written by: Bella Thorne
- Produced by: Bella Thorne
- Starring: Abella Danger; Small Hands
- Cinematography: Bianca Butti
- Edited by: Brennan Pierson
- Music by: Mod Sun
- Production companies: Pornhub; Lonely Cat Production
- Distributed by: Pornhub
- Release date: September 13, 2019
- Running time: 32 minutes
- Country: United States
- Language: English

Her & Him is a 2019 American pornographic film written and directed by Bella Thorne and starring pornographic actors Abella Danger and Small Hands.

The film received numerous industry awards, including nominations for Best Actress, Best Actor, and Best Dramatic Screenplay at the 37th Adult Video News Awards in 2020. It was shown at the 2019 Oldenburg International Film Festival and then released on Pornhub's Premium service.

== Plot ==
Her & Him is a narrative-driven short film. Small Hands plays an unnamed character who is dating an unnamed girl played by Abella Danger. He finds out that she has been looking up how to murder her boyfriend and get away with it. The two play a twisted game of cat and mouse while he tries to figure out if she is really trying to kill him.

== Conception and production ==
Her & Him is the third entry in Pornhub's Visionaries Director's Club, a series of movies where Pornhub invites guest celebrity directors to "diversify porn production". Her & Him was written and directed by Bella Thorne and premiered at the Oldenburg Film Festival in Germany prior to streaming on Pornhub Premium.

According to Thorne, she originally conceived Her & Him as a Christmas-themed horror film before the project morphed into an adult film.

The film was produced by Pornhub with the help of producers Corey Price, Sami Reinhart and Jen Stein. All music in the film is by rapper Mod Sun and overseen by the film's music supervisor, Dina Juntila. The film was shot by camera operators Carlos Benavides and Leslie Satterfield. Director of cinematography was Bianca Butti. The film was edited by Brennan Pierson and Malgorzata Grzyb.

== Reception ==
=== Critical response ===
Her & Him received overall positive reviews from critics, who praised Thorne's directing and artistic vision as well as the cinematography and music. One reviewer on AdultDVDTalk said: "The plot for Her & Him is exceptional, as Small Hands twists in the wind, unsure of what his girlfriend is up to, the viewer twists with him. Bella Thorne does a great job of building the dramatic tension in Her & Him as the short film progresses. As the dramatic tension keeps amping up, Bella Thorne also amps up the sexual tension in the short film. Small Hands and Abella Danger both kill in their roles. They both do an excellent job with the non-sexual portions of the short film and the sexual portions. [...] Her & Him is a fantastic adult short film from writer and director Bella Thorne. Her & Him is well-crafted and works beautifully in the short film format. The short film is plot-heavy and graphic sex light; however, the short film builds the eroticism to the boiling point before the graphical sex is unleashed on the viewer. Pornhub has done an excellent job with their streaming-only edition of Her & Him with excellent image and sound quality."

Decider.com said in a review: "What they [Romeo and Juliet] have in common is a high quotient of drama, the endlessly compelling motivational force behind so much of Thorne’s explosive output. Regardless of the format, regardless of platform, regardless of medium, a work by Bella Thorne can only ever be that — a work by Bella Thorne, nothing more and nothing less." In contrast, Jezebel said "Is this a visionary masterpiece from a 22-year-old who has never before made porn, and who, due to her mainstream fame, waltzed right into the industry and got to work with two of its top talents right off the bat? I am not at all convinced! I wish celebrities like Thorne would take their porn dalliances more seriously by giving the genre its due and respecting the art of arousing viewers, instead of treating it like a film school experiment and personal branding exercise."

=== Awards and nominations ===
Year	Ceremony	Award	Nominee	Result
2019	2nd Pornhub Awards	Visionary Award	Bella Thorne	Won
2020	37th Adult Video News Awards	Best Dramatic Screenplay	Bella Thorne	Nominated
2020	37th Adult Video News Awards	AVN Award for Best Actress	Abella Danger	Nominated
2020	37th Adult Video News Awards	AVN Award for Best Actor	Small Hands	Nominated
2020	37th Adult Video News Awards	Best Featurette	—	Nominated
2020	37th Adult Video News Awards	Best Soundtrack	—	Nominated
2020	XBIZ Awards	Best Sex Scene - Erotic-Themed	Abella Danger and Small Hands	Won
2020	XBIZ Awards	Best Art Direction	—	Nominated
2020	XBIZ Awards	Best Music	—	Nominated
