= TTYLXOX =

Single by Bella Thorne

from the album Shake It Up: Live 2 Dance
- Released: March 6, 2012
- Recorded: 2012
- Genre: Techno-pop
- Length: 2:34
- Label: Walt Disney
- Songwriters: Jeannie Lurie; Aris Archontis; Chen Neeman

Bella Thorne singles chronology
"Watch Me" (2011)	"TTYLXOX" (2012)	"Can't Stay Away" (2012)

"TTYLXOX (short for "Talk to You Later Hugs and Kisses", a combination of TTYL and XOX) is a song by American singer and actress Bella Thorne from the soundtrack Shake It Up: Live 2 Dance. It was written and produced by Jeannie Lurie, Aris Archontis and Chen Neeman. The song was released on March 6, 2012.

== Background and composition ==
The song was composed by the trio of songwriters and producers Jeannie Lurie, Aris Archontis and Chen Neeman. It was released on iTunes in March 2012. The song was the first single, along with "Something to Dance For" by Zendaya, from the soundtrack Shake It Up: Live 2 Dance and was used in an episode of Shake It Up.

== Music video ==
The video was released on March 9, 2012. It was a mash-up video with "Something to Dance For" which the girls start off to request for each other's song and then Zendaya starts to sing and dance with her group of people, then "TTYLXOX" plays with Bella Thorne dancing and singing with her group, and then finally the songs mash up with both Zendaya and Bella Thorne singing their songs and dancing together.

== Charts ==
The song debuted at number 98 on the US Billboard Hot 100 chart and peaked number 97.

Chart (2011–2012)	Peak position
Canada (Canadian Hot 100)	71
UK Singles Chart	170
US Billboard Hot 100	97
US Heatseekers (Billboard)	15

== Release history ==
Country	Date	Format	Label
United States	March 6, 2012	Digital download	Walt Disney Records
United Kingdom	May 8, 2012	Digital download	Walt Disney Records
