= Midnight Sun (2018 film) =

2018 romantic drama film by Scott Speer

- Theatrical release poster
- Directed by: Scott Speer
- Written by: Eric Kirsten
- Based on: A Song to the Sun by Kenji Bando
- Produced by: Jen Gatien; John Rickard; Zack Schiller
- Starring: Bella Thorne; Patrick Schwarzenegger; Rob Riggle; Quinn Shephard; Suleka Mathew
- Cinematography: Karsten Gopinath
- Edited by: Michelle Harrison; Tia Nolan
- Music by: Nate Walcott
- Production companies: Boies / Schiller Film Group; Wrigley Pictures
- Distributed by: Global Road Entertainment
- Release date: March 23, 2018
- Running time: 91 minutes
- Country: United States
- Language: English
- Budget: $2.8 million
- Box office: $27.4 million

Midnight Sun is a 2018 American romantic drama film based on the 2006 Japanese film A Song to the Sun. The film was directed by Scott Speer and written by Eric Kirsten, and stars Bella Thorne, Patrick Schwarzenegger, and Rob Riggle.

The story is about a teenaged girl with xeroderma pigmentosum (XP), a medical condition which prevents her from going out into sunlight. When she meets a boy, she struggles to decide whether to tell him about her condition or pretend to live a normal life.

Principal photography began on October 12, 2015, in Vancouver, British Columbia, Canada. The film was released in the United States on March 23, 2018.

== Plot ==
Sheltered since her early childhood, Katie Price has a rare genetic condition called xeroderma pigmentosum, which prevents an individual from being exposed to direct sunlight. She is housebound during daylight hours and is cared for by her father Jack and best friend Morgan.

Katie comes out of the house every night after the sun has set. One night, her long time crush, Charlie, notices her while playing guitar at a train station. When he tries to speak to her, she leaves abruptly and forgets her notebook, which Charlie keeps.

Charlie returns the next day and gives it to Katie when she shows up to retrieve it. He explains to her how he got his injury, preventing him from getting a scholarship to the University of California, Berkeley, before kissing her.

However, Katie has yet to tell Charlie of her condition, despite her father warning her to do so. Charlie takes Katie out for a night to Seattle, where they go to a live show, and Charlie convinces Katie to play one of her songs on one of the city's streets.

Once home, they go swimming out in the lake, and dry off with a fire on the beach. Charlie mentions watching the sunrise, and Katie suddenly realizes her watch stopped so she runs home in fear. Charlie picks her up and quickly drives her there, but she does not make it in time, and is exposed to the sunlight for just a couple of seconds. Katie runs inside, while Morgan and Jack come home soon after.

Charlie is still standing at the front door, and Morgan explains Katie's condition to him. Once the doctors run some tests, they come to the conclusion that Katie's brain is contracting from her being in the sun, and it is only a matter of time before she dies. She develops twitches that prevent her from playing guitar and ignores Charlie’s messages and calls.

Jack eventually convinces Katie to speak to Charlie, who still wants to be with her and does not care about her condition. She goes to Charlie's swim meet with the Berkeley coach, and they hang out at the house with Morgan and Jack.

Charlie takes Katie out one night, and surprises her by booking a recording session, where she sings a song she wrote for him. Soon after, while hanging out at her house, Charlie mentions that he has to visit the boat for the last time, which he has been hired to take care of the whole summer.

Katie, knowing that she is going to die, remembers the time Charlie told her that he wished they could sail together, and convinces Jack to let her go with him, despite it being during the day. Katie sails with Charlie, feels the sunlight, and spends her final moments with him, dying shortly thereafter.

Some time later, Charlie goes to Katie's house, where he bids farewell to Jack as he is going to pursue his swimming dreams at Berkeley. Jack tells Charlie that Katie is who convinced the recruiter to come to the meet and also wanted him to keep the notebook.

As Charlie is setting out, when he listens to Katie's song on the radio he reads the heartfelt message that Katie wrote for him in the notebook. In it, Katie tells Charlie to watch for the new things that are coming his way and to look up in the sky and always remember that she loves him.

== Cast ==
- Bella Thorne as Katie Price
  - Ava Dewhurst as young Katie
- Patrick Schwarzenegger as Charlie Reed
- Rob Riggle as Jack Price, Katie's father
- Quinn Shephard as Morgan, Katie's bestfriend
  - Audrey Smallman as young Morgan
- Suleka Mathew as Dr. Paula Fleming, Katie's doctor
- Nicholas Coombe as Garver
- Ken Tremblett as Mark Reed
- Jennifer Griffin as Barb Reed
- Tiera Skovbye as Zoe Carmichael
  - Jaeda Lily Miller as young Zoe
- Austin Obiajunwa as Owen
- Alex Pangburn as Wes
- Paul McGillion as Blake Jones

== Production ==
On June 22, 2015, it was announced that Scott Speer would next direct a young adult romantic drama film, Midnight Sun, based on the script by Eric Kirsten, which would star Patrick Schwarzenegger as Charlie and Bella Thorne as Katie. The film is based on the 2006 Japanese film of same name. It was financed by Boies / Schiller Film Group, and produced by John Rickard and Zack Schiller. On October 9, 2015, Rob Riggle joined the film to play Katie's father, Jack.

=== Filming ===
Principal photography on the film began on October 12, 2015, in Vancouver, British Columbia.

== Soundtrack ==
Midnight Sun (Original Motion Picture Soundtrack)

Soundtrack album by Various artists
- Released: March 16, 2018
- Recorded: 2017
- Genre: Soundtrack
- Length: 46:29
- Label: Lakeshore

Singles from Midnight Sun
- 1. "Burn So Bright" Released: January 19, 2018; 2. "Walk with Me" Released: March 2, 2018

Midnight Sun (Original Motion Picture Soundtrack) is the film's soundtrack album. It was released on March 16, 2018 through Lakeshore Records.

The album was preceded by two singles—"Burn So Bright" and "Walk with Me".

Midnight Sun (Original Motion Picture Soundtrack) track listing
No.	Title	Writer(s)	Artist(s)	Length
1.	"Burn So Bright"		Bella Thorne	3:22
2.	"Reaching"		Thorne	2:44
3.	"Warsaw"		Morgan Kibby	3:52
4.	"What's Real"	Van Pierszalowski; Brian DaMert; Greg Sellin; Andrew Wales; Sara DaMert	Waters	3:27
5.	"Stockholm"		Adriel	3:14
6.	"Sweetest Feeling"		Thorne	2:07
7.	"Walk with Me"		Thorne	3:24
8.	"Where I Stand"	Mia Wray	Wray	3:23
9.	"Let the Light In"		Thorne	3:18
10.	"Katie's House"		Nate Walcott	2:16
11.	"Mom's Guitar"		Walcott	1:36
12.	"I'm Old School Too"		Walcott	0:52
13.	"Facts"		Walcott	0:42
14.	"Chili Party"		Walcott	0:40
15.	"Boat Dock Talk"		Walcott	1:18
16.	"Sailing Sounds Perfect"		Walcott	1:15
17.	"Wanna Go out on a Real Date?"		Walcott	1:23
18.	"I'm Not Swimming"		Walcott	1:22
19.	"Skinny Dip Kiss"		Walcott	1:58
20.	"Sunrise"		Walcott	1:58
21.	"Triggering Event"		Walcott	1:35
22.	"That Would Be Fine"		Walcott	0:54
Total length:				46:29

== Release history ==
Country	Date	Format	Label
Various	March 16, 2018	digital download · CD	

== Release ==
In October 2016, Open Road Films acquired distribution rights to the film. They initially scheduled it for July 14, 2017, before setting it for March 23, 2018.

=== Box office ===
Midnight Sun grossed $9.6 million in the United States and Canada, and $17.8 million in other territories, for a total worldwide gross $27.4 million.

In the United States, Midnight Sun was released alongside Pacific Rim Uprising, Sherlock Gnomes, Unsane and Paul, Apostle of Christ, and was projected to gross around $5 million from 2,173 theaters in its opening weekend. It ended up debuting to $4 million, finishing 10th at the box office. It fell 54% to $1.8 million in its second week.

=== Critical response ===
On the review aggregator website Rotten Tomatoes, 21% of 63 critics' reviews are positive, with an average rating of 4.2/10. The website's consensus reads: "Midnight Sun is a typically manipulative and contrived teen romance that's unfortunately distinguished by its offensively inaccurate portrayal of a real-life disease." Metacritic, which uses a weighted average, assigned the film a score of 38 out of 100, based on 14 critics, indicating "generally unfavorable" reviews. Audiences polled by CinemaScore gave the film an average grade of "A−" on an A+ to F scale.

=== Accolades ===
Year	Award	Category	Recipient(s)	Result	Ref.
2018	Teen Choice Awards	Choice Movie: Drama	Midnight Sun	Nominated	
2018	Teen Choice Awards	Choice Drama Movie Actor	Patrick Schwarzenegger	Nominated	
2018	Teen Choice Awards	Choice Drama Movie Actress	Bella Thorne	Nominated	
2018	Teen Choice Awards	Choice Movie Ship	Bella Thorne and Patrick Schwarzenegger	Nominated	
2018	People's Choice Awards	Favorite Dramatic Movie	Midnight Sun	Nominated	
