= Call It Whatever (song) =

2014 single by Bella Thorne

Single by Bella Thorne
- Released: May 13, 2014
- Recorded: 2013
- Genre: Pop
- Length: 3:02
- Label: Hollywood
- Songwriters: Pär Westerlund; Rickard Göransson; Skyler Stonestreet; Bella Thorne
- Producer: Paro

Bella Thorne singles chronology
"Contagious Love" (2013)	"Call It Whatever" (2014)	"Just Call" (2017)

"Call It Whatever" is a song recorded by American actress and singer Bella Thorne. It was co-written by Pär Westerlund, Rickard Göransson, and Skyler Stonestreet and produced by Paro. The Razor N Guido remix was included in her extended play Jersey.

== Background ==
Thorne first heard the song while in Africa filming the movie Blended and got the chorus stuck in her head. She thought the song was "fun" upon hearing it for the first time and decided it would be a good match for her. Thorne spoke about the song saying "Call It Whatever is my youngest-sounding song, this song is definitely for my younger audience". The song was originally intended as the lead single and title track from her unreleased debut album of the same name, before being scrapped

== Composition ==
"Call It Whatever" has been described as a "an upbeat, flirty pop tune with a playful nature." Thorne's debut has been called "mainstream" and "following in the footsteps of many Disney Channel stars before her." Lyrically, Thorne said the song is about "a boy and a girl that didn't really know what to call [their relationship] so they're calling it whatever because they don't care what anybody else calls it."

== Critical reception ==
Alex Kritselis from Bustle.com gave a mixed review, describing the song as "hardly a masterpiece" also saying "In fact, in many ways, it's kind of a disaster. Thorne's barely there vocals are absolutely dripping with auto-tune. At times, she barely even sounds human. And yet… the song is so damn catchy."

Thorne gained a lot of comparisons to other Disney stars who started music careers similarly to Thorne. She denied the comparisons by saying "I don't think about anything close to that. I don't think, 'Well, Miley went this way, and Selena went that way, so I have to go in the middle. That's not it. I'm just being me. My song is called 'Call It Whatever.' You can call me whatever, if you like me or not like me. I really don't care."

== Music video ==
A music video for the song was filmed in early April 2014. The video was directed by Mickey Finnegan and premiered on Vevo on May 29. It shows Thorne dressed up as a waitress in the 1950s diner. She dances and serves food while trying to get the attention of her crush. The video takes place in Cadillac Jack's Diner in San Fernando Valley, the same location used in the music videos "Want U Back" by Cher Lloyd and "Forget You" by CeeLo Green, as well as "La Da Dee" by Cody Simpson and Haley Reinhart's "Free". As of June 2024, the song's music video holds 78 million views on YouTube.

== Commercial performance ==
Despite months of the single being unsuccessful, it finally made its debut on a US national chart on November 10, 2014. "Call It Whatever" debuted on the Billboard Hot Dance Club Songs chart at number forty-seven on that date. After the release of Thorne's EP, Jersey, it quickly rose to its peak position of number ten during its seventh week, becoming her first top ten hit on the chart. The song spent ten weeks on the chart before falling off the chart after the week of January 24, 2015.

== Track listing ==
- Digital download
1. "Call It Whatever" – 3:02
- "Call It Whatever" – Remixes
1. "Call It Whatever" (Adam Turner Club Remix) – 7:23
2. "Call It Whatever" (Adam Turner Instrumental Remix) – 7:24
3. "Call It Whatever" (Adam Turner Radio Mix) – 4:06
4. "Call It Whatever" (Razor N Guido Main Remix) – 5:54
5. "Call It Whatever" (Razor N Guido Mixshow) – 5:25
6. "Call It Whatever" (Razor N Guido Radio Mix) – 3:42
7. "Call It Whatever" (RNG DuHb) – 5:24
8. "Call It Whatever" (Razor N Gudio Instrumental Remix) – 5:24
9. "Call It Whatever" (Riddler & Reid Stefan Remix) – 5:18
10. "Call It Whatever" (Riddler & Reid Stefan Radio Mix) – 3:58
11. "Call It Whatever" (Riddler & Reid Stefan Instrumental Remix) – 5:18
12. "Call It Whatever" (Riddler & Reid Stefan Instrumental Radio Mix) – 3:58

== Charts ==
Chart (2014–2015)	Peak position
US Hot Dance Club Songs (Billboard)	10

== Release history ==
Region	Date	Format	Label
United States	May 13, 2014	Digital download	Hollywood
