= Watch Me (Bella Thorne and Zendaya song) =

2011 single by Bella Thorne and Zendaya

Single by Bella Thorne and Zendaya

from the album Shake It Up: Break It Down
- Released: June 21, 2011
- Recorded: April 2011
- Genre: Electropop
- Length: 2:55
- Label: Walt Disney
- Songwriters: Ben Charles; Aaron Harmon; Jim Wes
- Producers: Charles; Harmon; Wes

Bella Thorne singles chronology
"Watch Me" (2011)	"TTYLXOX" (2012)

Zendaya singles chronology
"Swag It Out" (2011)	"Watch Me" (2011)	"Something to Dance For" (2012)

"Watch Me" is a song by American actresses and singers Bella Thorne and Zendaya.

It was produced by Ben Charles, Aaron Harmon, and Jim Wes, who also co-wrote the song for Shake It Up: Break It Down (2011), the soundtrack to the Disney Channel television series, Shake It Up. It was released as a single on June 21, 2011, through Walt Disney Records. An original version of the song, sung by Margaret Durante, is also included on the Shake It Up: Break It Down soundtrack.

It is the lead single from the soundtrack, performed by Bella Thorne and Zendaya. It peaked at number 63 on the Billboard Hot Digital Songs, and at number 86 on the Billboard Hot 100. The accompanying music video portrays Thorne and Zendaya in a building dancing with other people.

== Background ==
"Watch Me" was a single released from the soundtrack Shake It Up: Break It Down (2011), for the television series Shake It Up on Disney Channel. It was first heard on the series' first episode under the original Margaret Durante version, which premiered on November 7, 2010, in North America, seven months before the single's actual release. The girls recorded the cover song in April 2011, as multiple pictures were tweeted and news outlets reported. The original song was heard in several other episodes of Shake It Up.

== Music video ==
Bella Thorne and Zendaya enjoy the dancing and singing in the video. The video has many cuts/close-up shots of Zendaya and Bella singing to the song. On January 17, 2015, the video reached 100 million views on Vevo, winning a Vevo Certified Award.

=== Synopsis ===
The clip begins with Bella Thorne and Zendaya at a photo shoot, and they hear music playing. They see an abandoned warehouse and look through a broken window. Inside, there is a group of dancers dancing to the music. They then exchange their dresses for colorful dance clothes, enter the warehouse and join the group of dancers. Close-up shots of them singing the song are intercut throughout the video.

=== Release ===
The music video was released on June 17, 2011, during the series premiere of A.N.T. Farm.

== Chart performance ==
Chart (2011)	Peak position
US Billboard Hot 100	86
US Top Heatseekers	9
US Kid Digital Songs	1

== Certifications ==
Region	Certification	Certified units/sales
United States (RIAA)	Gold	500,000^{*}
^{*} Sales figures based on certification alone.
