= Jersey (EP) =

2014 EP by Bella Thorne

EP by Bella Thorne
- Released: November 17, 2014
- Recorded: 2013–14
- Length: 19:01
- Label: Hollywood
- Producers: Bobby Brackins; Dreamlab; Ian Kirkpatrick; Kool Kojak; Paro

Bella Thorne chronology
| Made in Japan (2012) | Jersey (2014) |

Jersey is the debut solo extended play by American singer and actress Bella Thorne. It was released on November 17, 2014 by Hollywood Records.

== Background ==
In March 2013, Thorne announced she'd been signed to Hollywood Records, and began working on her debut album. On August 23, 2013, she discussed details about her upcoming album, telling MTV: "What fans can expect is [for it] just to be very different from anyone, because I don't like to be one of those artists where you can be like: 'Oh yeah, I know them from that song.' All my songs are very different from each other. So I don't want to be known as only one genre."

== Development ==
On March 28, 2014, Thorne announced her debut album would be named as the single, and confirmed it will consist of eleven songs. In a Billboard article published on May 2, 2014, it was revealed that the album would be called Call It Whatever, and the release date would be June 24, 2014. Thorne revealed the reason why the album took so long was because "I really wanted to work on my voice. I never sang before, and I didn't want to put an album out that I wasn't proud of, or that was Auto-tuned or anything like that. I waited so that I could take a lot of vocal classes, so that I could work on my voice every day". Thorne described the sound of her album as a mix between R&B and electropop, citing as influences artists like Mariah Carey, Destiny's Child, Usher and Miley Cyrus. In an interview with Access Hollywood, she promoted the project as very feminist.

About her first single, "Call It Whatever", Thorne said she purposely chose a teen pop song to make a connection between her Disney Channel audience and the urban audience that she wanted to reach and this was the album's only teen piece, while her next single would be focused on R&B: "'Call It Whatever' is my youngest-sounding song. This song is definitely for my younger audience. I don't want to eliminate them, but my album is geared a little bit older."

=== Full album cancellation and EP ===
"I never wanted to really be a singer. My father always told me, if you're going to do something, you better not do it if you don't do it well"

— Thorne about the full album cancellation

However, on October 15, Thorne announced that her full-length debut album would be scrapped in favor of an EP instead and the eleven recorded songs were archived. The following week, Thorne announced the official track list along with a preview of "Paperweight". The EP was released on November 17, with no single released and soon after, Thorne announced her departure from Hollywood Records.

In April 2015, Thorne opened up to J-14 about the real reason her album was never released: the album didn't sound like she imagined and she wasn't happy with the "auto-tuned bad music", so Thorne realized she wouldn't be a great singer and decided to cancel the project.

== Promotion ==
No single was released, only the remix version of "Call It Whatever" was included in Jersey. Thorne promoted the EP once, during the event Shall We Dance on Ice, in Bloomington, Illinois, on December 16, 2014, when she performed "Jersey".

== Track listing ==
On October 28, 2014, Thorne posted a picture on her Facebook page from what is likely the behind the scenes of her EP/original album cover photoshoot which included the official track list for the EP. Credits taken from Qobuz, except for the title track, taken from APRA AMCOS.

| No. | Title | Writer(s) | Producer(s) | Length |
|---|---|---|---|---|
| 1. | "Jersey" | Bella Thorne; Jon Redwine; Bobby Brackins; Bebe Rexha; Jazy Paris | Brackins | 3:04 |
| 2. | "Paperweight" | Ian Kirkpatrick; Lindy Robbins | Kirkpatrick | 3:33 |
| 3. | "One More Night" | Thorne; Bebe Rexha; Leah Haywood; Daniel James | Dreamlab | 3:24 |
| 4. | "Boyfriend Material" | Charlotte Aitchison; Allan Grigg | Kool Kojak | 3:06 |
| 5. | "Call It Whatever" (Razor N Guido Remix) | Par Westerland; Rickard Göransson; Skyler Stonestreet | Paro; Razor N Guido | 5:54 |
| Total length: | | | | 19:01 |

== Original track listing ==
In June 2014, Hollywood Records published an album listing for the original edition of Jersey, entitled Call It Whatever.

Original album edition track listing
| No. | Title | Writer(s) | Producer(s) | Length |
|---|---|---|---|---|
| 1. | "Call It Whatever" | Par Westerland; Rickard Göransson; Skyler Stonestreet | Paro | 3:05 |
| 2. | "Paperweight" | Ian Kirkpatrick; Lindy Robbins | Kirkpatrick | 3:33 |
| 3. | "One More Night" | Bella Thorne; Bebe Rexha; Leah Haywood; Daniel James | Dreamlab | 3:24 |
| 4. | "Boomerang" | | | 2:56 |
| 5. | "Boyfriend Material" | Charlotte Aitchison; Allan Grigg | Kool Kojak | 3:06 |
| 6. | "Drop the Beat" | | | 3:31 |
| 7. | "Down Like That" (featuring Jacob Latimore) | | | 3:00 |
| 8. | "Break Into My Heart" | | | 3:23 |
| 9. | "Daydream" | Joshua Devon Walker; Jaden Michaels; Sophia Black; Abram Dean | | 3:02 |
| 10. | "Bad Case of U" | Alex Cantrall; Bella Thorne; Akos Letray; Stephen Stahl; Courtney Jenaé | Alex Cantrall | 2:57 |
| 11. | "Jersey" | Thorne; Jon Redwine; Bobby Brackins; Bebe Rexha; Jazy Paris | Brackins | 3:04 |

Original Target planned edition bonus tracks
| No. | Title | Writer(s) | Producer(s) | Length |
|---|---|---|---|---|
| 12. | "X-Ray Spex" | Kool Kojak; Charlotte Aitchison; Jacob Kasher | Kool Kojak | 2:55 |
| 13. | "Soopa Gloo" | Maureen Anne McDonald; Allan Peter Grigg |

== Credits and personnel ==
Credits adapted from the liner notes of Jersey

- Bella Thorne – lead vocals, songwriter
- Bobby Brackins – background vocals, songwriter, record producer
- Charlotte Aitchison – songwriter
- Bebe Rexha – songwriter
- Leah Haywood – songwriter
- Allan Grigg – songwriter, producer
- Par Westerland – songwriter
- Daniel James – songwriter
- Dreamlab – producer, vocal producer
- Ian Kirkpatrick – songwriter, producer
- Rickard Göransson – songwriter
- Skyler Stonestreet – songwriter

== Release history ==
| Country | Date | Format | Label |
|---|---|---|---|
| Canada | November 17, 2014 | Digital download | Hollywood |
| France | November 17, 2014 | Digital download | Hollywood |
| Mexico | November 17, 2014 | Digital download | Hollywood |
| United States | November 17, 2014 | Digital download | Hollywood |
