= Shake It Up: Break It Down =

2011 soundtrack album

Soundtrack album by various artists
- Released: July 12, 2011
- Length: 43:19
- Label: Walt Disney

Singles from Shake It Up: Break It Down
- 1. "Watch Me" Released: June 21, 2011

Shake It Up: Break It Down (known as Shake It Up: Dance Dance internationally, or simply Shake It Up) is the soundtrack from the first season (2010–2011) of Disney Channel hit original series, Shake It Up. It was released on July 12, 2011 as a 2 Disc CD + DVD combo, with the DVD showing the dance steps. It has peaked at number 22 on the US Billboard 200 and topped the US Billboard Top Soundtracks and the US Billboard Kid Albums. Elsewhere, it has peaked at number 65 in Mexico.

== Singles ==
"Shake It Up" by Selena Gomez was released as first promotional single and peaked at number 9 on the U.S. Billboard Bubbling Under Hot 100 Singles chart and is also serves as the series theme song. "Watch Me" by Bella Thorne and Zendaya, was released as lead single and peaked at number 86 on U.S. Billboard Hot 100.

== Track listing ==
No.	Title	Writer(s)	Produced by	Length
1.	"Shake It Up" (Selena Gomez)	Jeannie Lurie; Aris Archontis; Chen Neeman	Lurie; Archontis; Neeman	3:00
2.	"Breakout" (Margaret Durante)	Ben Charles; Aaron Harmon; Jim Wes	Charles; Harmon; Wes	2:59
3.	"Not Too Young" (Nevermind and Chris Trousdale)	Antonina Armato; Tim James; Thomas Sturges; Braxton Langston-Chapman	Rock Mafia	2:55
4.	"School's Out" (Kyra Christiaan)	Charles; Harmon; Wes	Charles; Harmon; Wes	2:34
5.	"Watch Me" (Margaret Durante)	Charles; Harmon; Wes	Charles; Harmon; Wes	2:55
6.	"All the Way Up" (Alana de Fonseca)	Ali Dee Theodore; Sarai Howard; Fonseca; Jason Gleed	Ali Dee	3:30
7.	"We Right Here" (Drew Ryan Scott)	Dapo Torimiro; Scott	Dapo	3:11
8.	"Dance for Life" (Drew Seeley and Adam Hicks)	Lambert Waldrip; Adam Hicks; Justin Mobley; Anna Vasilenko; Tocarra Phillips	Stereo	2:55
9.	"Twist My Hips" (Tim James and Nevermind)	Armato; James; Sturges; Nevermind	Rock Mafia	2:56
10.	"Roll the Dice" (Annie Vincent)	Niclas Molinder; Joacim Persson; Johan Alkenäs; Geraldo Sandell	Twin; Alkenas	2:58
11.	"Just Wanna Dance" (Geraldo Sandell and Ricky Luna)	Molinder; Persson; Jonas Thander; Charlie Mason; Luna	Twin; Alkenas	3:07
12.	"Our Generation" (Sibel Redžep)	Molinder; Persson; Alkenas; Scott	Twin; Alkenas	4:15
13.	"All Electric" (Anna Margaret and Nevermind)	Armato; James; Sturges; Nevermind	Rock Mafia	3:07
14.	"Watch Me" (Bella Thorne and Zendaya)	Charles; Harmon; Wes	Charles; Harmon; Wes	2:55

iTunes Store bonus track
No.	Title	Writer(s)	Length
15.	"Bling Bling" (Windy Wagner)	Joleen Belle; Windy Wagner; Michael Smidi Smith	2:36

Amazon MP3 bonus track
No.	Title	Writer(s)	Produced by	Length
15.	"It's Alive" (Nayana Holley)	Jeannie Lurie; Aris Archontis; Chen Neeman	Lurie; Archontis; Neeman	3:21

Deluxe edition – Physical DVD and iTunes Store bonus videos
No.	Title	Length
1.	"Menu" (DVD)	0:31
2.	"Introduction"	0:40
3.	"School's Out" (dance routine)	10:14
4.	"Watch Me" (dance routine)	11:40
5.	"Breakout" (dance routine)	10:50
6.	"Not Too Young" (dance routine)	11:40
7.	"Shake It Up" (dance routine)	11:46
8.	"End Credits" (DVD)	0:33

== Critical reception ==
Professional ratings
Review scores
Source	Rating
AllMusic	4/5 stars

Andrew Leahey of AllMusic gave a review: Released toward the end of Shake It Up's first season, this soundtrack features 14 songs from the hit Disney series, as well as a bonus DVD of step-by-step dance routines. Selena Gomez sings the title song, while actresses Bella Thorne and Zendaya perform the album's second single, "Watch Me".

== Commercial performance ==
It peaked at number 22 on the US Billboard 200 and topped the US Billboard Top Soundtracks and the US Billboard Kid Albums. Elsewhere, it peaked at number 65 in Mexico.

== Charts ==
Chart (2011)	Peak position
Mexican Album Charts	65
U.S. Billboard 200	22
U.S. Billboard Top Soundtracks	1
U.S. Billboard Kid Albums	1

== Certifications ==
Region	Certification	Certified units/sales
Brazil (Pro-Música Brasil)	Gold	20,000^{*}
^{*} Sales figures based on certification alone.

== "Shake It Up" song ==
"Shake It Up"

Promotional single by Selena Gomez

from the album Shake It Up: Break It Down
- Released: February 15, 2011
- Length: 3:00
- Label: Walt Disney
- Songwriters: Jeannie Lurie; Aris Archontis; Chen Neeman
- Producers: Jeannie Lurie; Aris Archontis; Chen Neeman

"Shake It Up" is a song recorded by American singer and actress Selena Gomez. The song was written and produced by Jeannie Lurie, Aris Archontis and Chen Neeman for Shake It Up: Break It Down, the soundtrack to the Disney Channel TV series Shake It Up and served as the theme song of the series. The song was released as a promotional single on October 24, 2010, by Walt Disney Records and peaked at number 65 on the US Billboard Digital Songs chart.

=== Release history ===
Country	Date	Format	Label
United States	February 15, 2011	Digital download	Walt Disney
United Kingdom	July 8, 2011	Digital download	Walt Disney

=== Certifications ===
Region	Certification	Certified units/sales
United States (RIAA)	Gold	500,000^{‡}
^{‡} Sales+streaming figures based on certification alone.
