= Bella Thorne =

American actress and singer (born 1997)

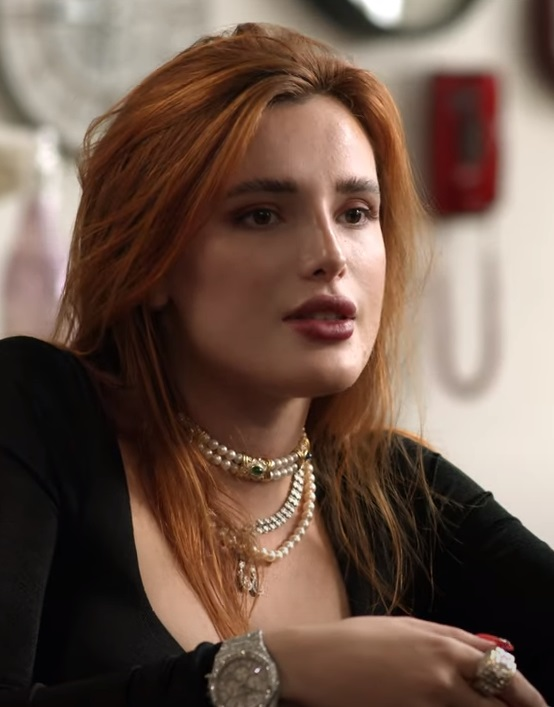
- Thorne in 2022
- Born: Annabella Avery Thorne; October 8, 1997 (age 29); Pembroke Pines, Florida, U.S.
- Occupations: Actress; singer; writer
- Years active: 2003–present
- Partner(s): Benjamin Mascolo (2019–2022; ex-fiancé); Mark Emms (2022–present; engaged)
- Musical career
- Instrument: Vocals
- Labels: Hollywood; Epic

Annabella Avery Thorne (born October 8, 1997) is an American actress, singer, and writer. She first received recognition for her roles as Margaux Darling in the series Dirty Sexy Money (2007–2008) and as Ruthy Spivey in the drama series My Own Worst Enemy (2009), the latter of which earned her a Young Artist Award.

Thorne gained prominence for her role as CeCe Jones on the Disney Channel series Shake It Up (2010–2013), for which she received several awards and nominations, including winning an Imagen Award. Thorne has since appeared in numerous feature films, including Blended (2014), Alvin and the Chipmunks: The Road Chip (2015), The Babysitter and its sequel (2017–2020). She received praise for her roles in The DUFF (2015), Amityville: The Awakening (2017), and Infamous (2020). Thorne also led the drama series Famous in Love (2017–2018), for which she received nominations from the Teen Choice Awards.

Outside of acting, Thorne has ventured into music; she released her debut single, "Watch Me" in 2011, which charted at No. 86 on the US Billboard Hot 100. She has since released the EP Made in Japan in 2012 and the EP Jersey in 2014. She made her directorial debut in 2019, directing the pornographic film Her & Him, which garnered positive reviews and won a Pornhub Visionary Award.

== Early life ==
Annabella Avery Thorne was born on October 8, 1997, in Pembroke Pines, Florida, the daughter of Tamara Thorne and Delancey Reinaldo "Rey" Thorne. She has three siblings who are also actors. Her father, who was of Cuban descent, died in a traffic accident in April 2007, when Thorne was nine years old. She has said that she was raised by a mother who was supporting four children, that they were very poor, and that she originally began working as a child actress to help support the family.

In September 2017, Thorne revealed that she had lived in a suburban area, spoke Spanish as her first language, and that she was bullied while growing up because she was dyslexic. She was diagnosed with dyslexia while in first grade. She was home-schooled after previously attending a public school, where she had been bullied. She improved in her learning after attending a Sylvan Learning center and began reading and writing a grade ahead. In April 2010, she said she had overcome dyslexia by rigorously reading everything she could find, including cereal box labels.

In January 2018, Thorne wrote on Instagram that she had been physically and sexually abused as a child, "from the day I can remember till I was 14". In 2019, she told ABC News' Juju Chang that the abuse began when she was six years old. She did not name her alleged abuser, but said that he was "someone I was raised with".

== Career ==
=== 2003–2009: Early work and acting beginnings ===
Thorne's first film appearance was an uncredited role as a sidelines fan in the 2003 film Stuck on You. She has since appeared in film and television projects including Entourage and The O.C. as a younger version of Taylor Townsend. In 2007, she joined the recurring cast of Dirty Sexy Money's second season as Margaux Darling. This is her first major television role. The series revolves around lawyer and family man Nick George; when Nick's father mysteriously dies in a plane crash, he agrees to take his position as the Darling family's lawyer, while trying to discover who committed the murder.

In 2008, Thorne starred alongside Christian Slater and Taylor Lautner in the short-lived drama series My Own Worst Enemy, for which she won a Young Artist Award for her portrayal of the character Ruthy Spivey; Thorne described her Enemy casting as a major breakthrough as this was the first recurring role in her career. The same year, she starred in the third-last episode of October Road as Angela Ferilli, the pre-adolescence crush of the main characters. Her older brother Remy also guest-starred in the same episode as a younger Eddie Latekka.

In 2009, she starred in the web series Little Monk, which depicted characters from the series Monk, as Wendy, one of Adrian Monk's classmates. The webisodes are available only on the "Best of Monk" DVD. Also in 2009, she played the role of the vengeful antagonist in the horror film Forget Me Not. Thorne took on a supporting role in the family drama Raspberry Magic, which premiered at the Cinequest Film Festival and the San Francisco International Asian American Film Festival in 2010.

=== 2010–2013: Breakthrough with Disney and music ===
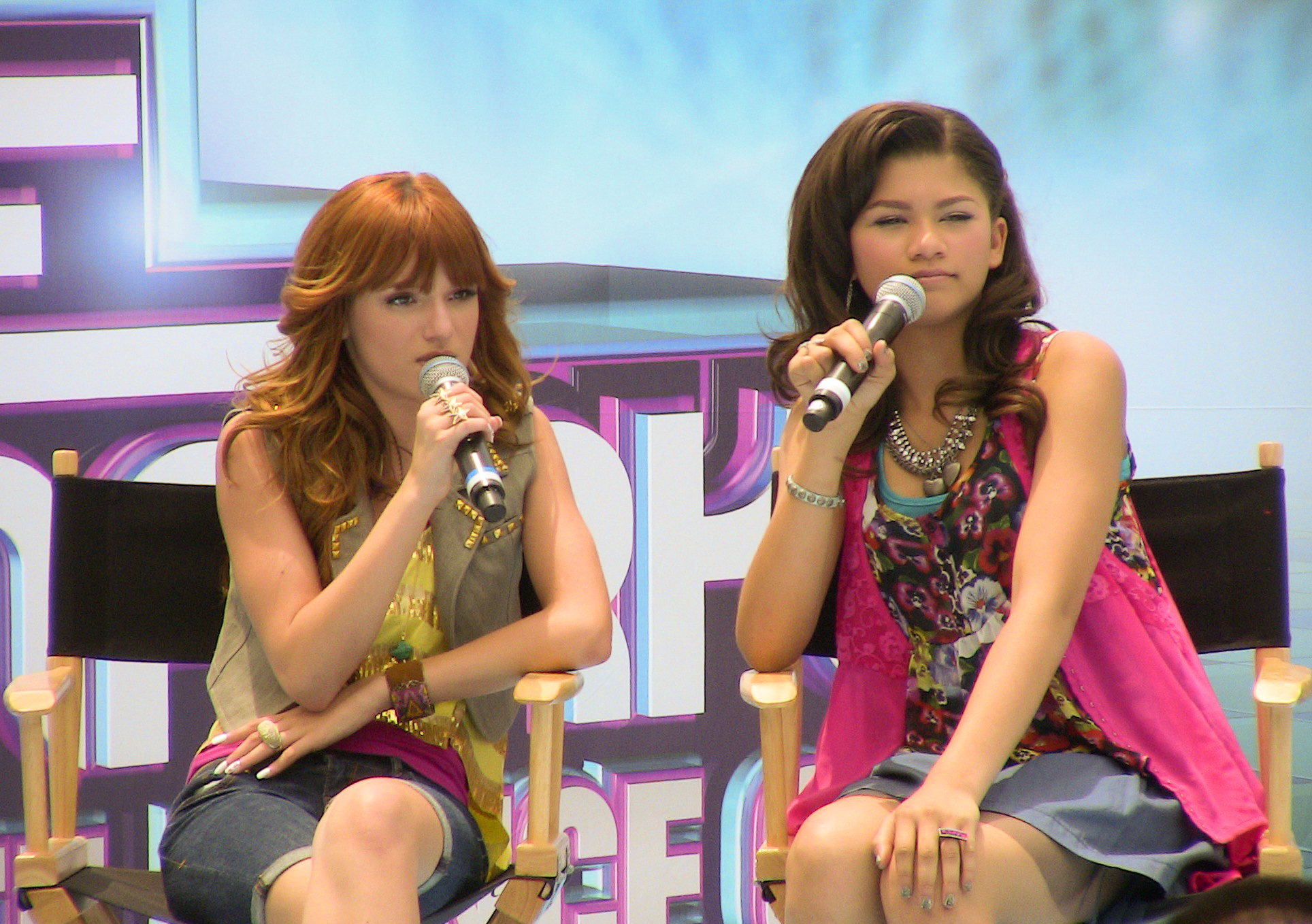
Thorne and Zendaya at a promotional event for Shake It Up in 2011

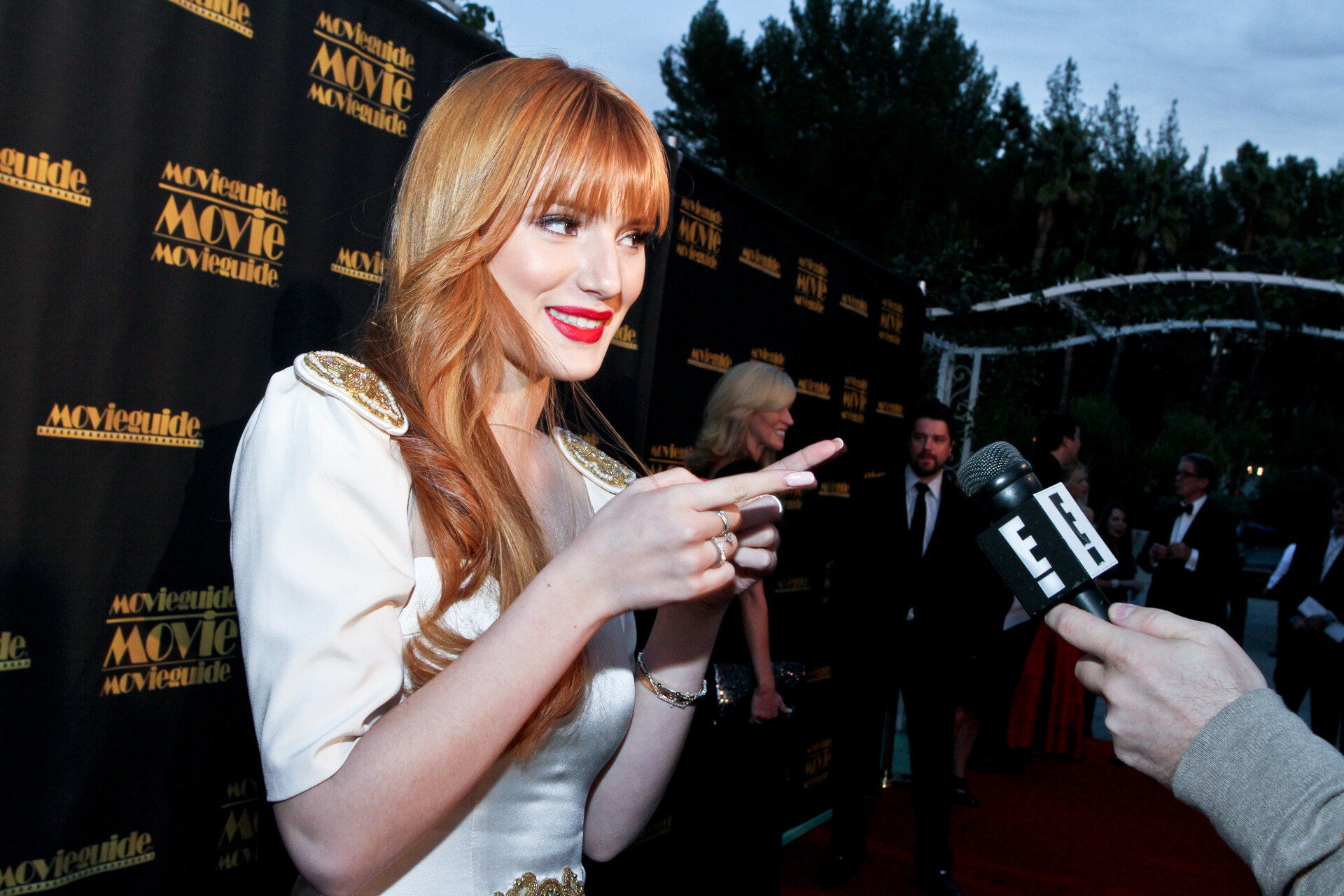
Thorne at the 2013 Movieguide Awards

In 2010, Thorne replaced Jolean Wejbe as Tancy "Teenie" Henrickson, Bill and Barb Henrickson's younger daughter, in Season 4 of HBO's Big Love. Thorne co-starred on the Disney Channel sitcom Shake It Up, originally titled Dance, Dance Chicago. Thorne played CeCe Jones, a dancer with ambitions for a career in the spotlight despite having dyslexia. The show is a buddy comedy centered on a teen dance show (in a show-within-a-show format) co-starring Thorne and Zendaya. The multi-camera series began production in Hollywood, California, in July 2010 and premiered on November 7, 2010, on Disney Channel. While she had a substantial portfolio of work in television and film, Thorne had no experience in professional dancing before being cast. After signing onto the show in October 2009, she began taking three dance classes every night.

Thorne's first single, "Watch Me" was released on June 21, reaching 86 on the US Billboard Hot 100 charts, 9 on the US Top Heatseekers charts and earning RIAA: Gold. On September 29, 2011, Disney Channel announced it had increased Shake It Up's second season order to 26 episodes. A 90-minute special episode Made In Japan aired August 17, 2012, as the season two finale. On June 4, 2012, Disney Channel announced that Shake It Up had been renewed for a third season. In 2012, Thorne was cast as Avalon Greene in the Disney Channel Original Movie Frenemies. "TTYLXOX" was released on March 6, reaching 97 on the US Billboard Hot 100 charts. On March 30, 2013, it was confirmed by Hollywood Records via Twitter that Thorne had officially signed to the record label.

On July 25, 2013, Disney Channel confirmed that Shake It Up would be canceled after the show's third season. On April 23, 2013, Thorne announced her debut album with eleven songs. Thorne spoke about the album, saying "What fans can expect is [for it] just to be very different from anyone because I don't like to be one of those artists where you can be like: 'Oh yeah, I know them from that song.' All my songs are very different from each other. So I don't want to be known as only one genre." Thorne cited Britney Spears, Kesha, and Destiny's Child as influences for the album. In 2013, it was reported that Thorne had signed a new deal to write a series of books, beginning with her first novel, Autumn Falls.

=== 2014–2017: Mainstream film and television ===
In 2014, Thorne co-starred in the comedy Blended, as Adam Sandler's character's daughter. She also co-starred in the films Alexander and the Terrible, Horrible, No Good, Very Bad Day (2014) and The DUFF (2015), playing high school antagonists. On July 30, Thorne was cast in an episode of the fifteenth season of the CSI: Crime Scene Investigation. The episode, "The Book of Shadows", aired October 19, 2014. Thorne appeared in the sequel to Mostly Ghostly (2008), titled Mostly Ghostly: Have You Met My Ghoulfriend (2014) as Cammy Cahill. On October 15, Thorne revealed her debut album was canceled, saying she wasn't happy with the "auto-tuned bad music" she had in the works. She released an EP, Jersey, on November 17. The lead single from the EP, "Call It Whatever", debuted in the Billboard Hot Dance Club Songs chart at number forty-seven, eventually rising to number ten, spending a total of ten weeks on the chart. Thorne has signed on as one of the leads in Manis Film's thriller Big Sky; in which she plays Hazel. In 2014, Thorne was cast in the MTV series Scream, which is a television adaptation based on the original slasher film series Scream. Thorne was offered the lead role of the series but felt that the role of the "mean, terrible Nina" would be more iconic.

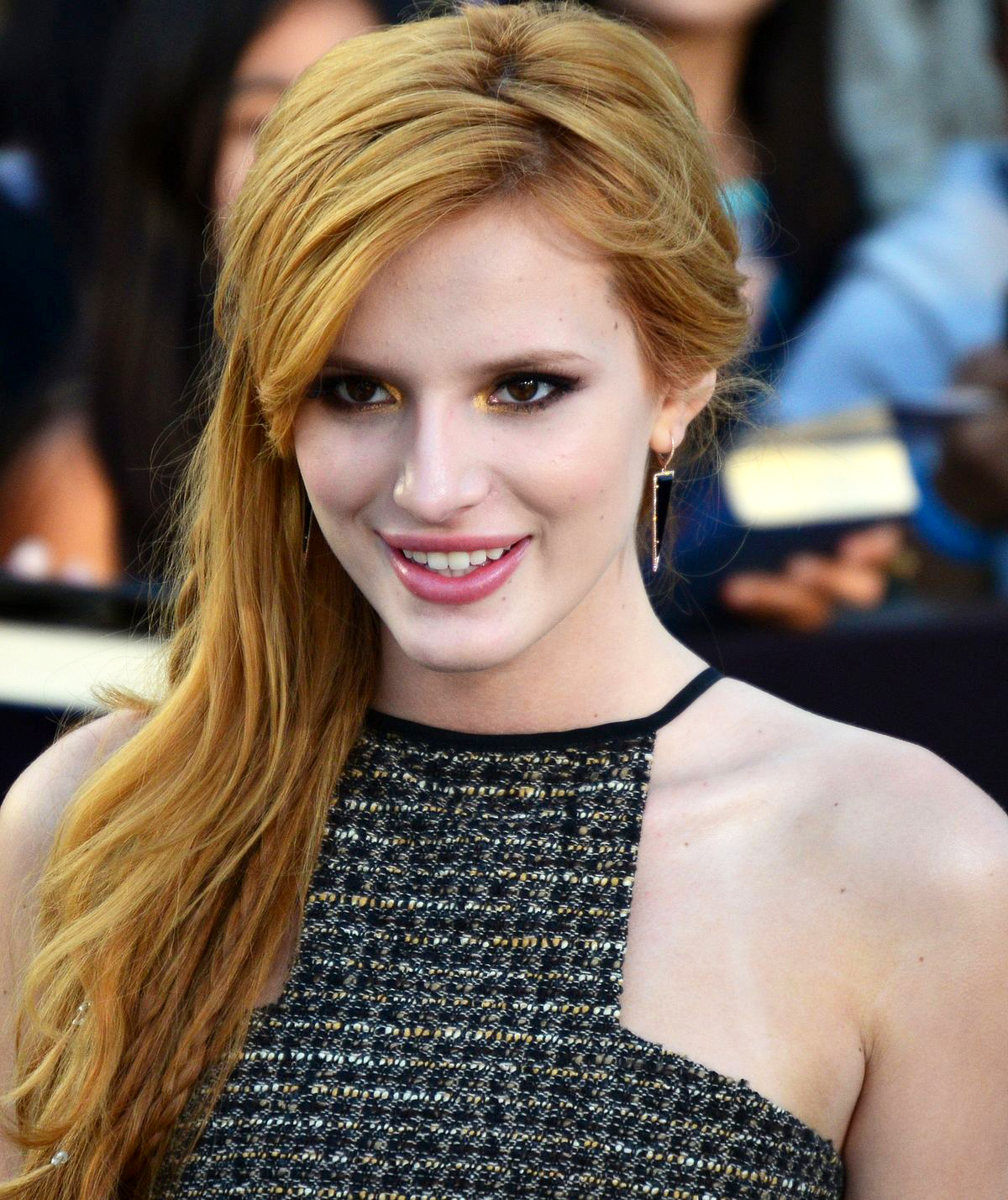
Thorne at the premiere of Divergent in April 2014

In 2015, Thorne was cast in the animated U.S. dub of the film The Frog Kingdom, portraying the role of Frog Princess. The film was scheduled to be released on video on demand and on DVD beginning on June 30, 2015, by Lionsgate Home Entertainment. On June 1, 2015, it was announced that Thorne would star in the AwesomenessTV film Shovel Buddies, playing the role of Kate. The movie was released on iTunes on October 11, 2016. She also played Jamie, a disillusioned teenager intensely guarding a personal secret, in the film Keep Watching. Also in 2015, she appeared as Ashley, a young and famous singer in Alvin and the Chipmunks: The Road Chip.

In 2016, Thorne played Rain in Tyler Perry's Boo! A Madea Halloween. In 2017, Thorne went back to television with a drama series Famous in Love, airing on Freeform, in which she played Paige Townsen, an ordinary college student who gets her big break after auditioning for the starring role in a Hollywood blockbuster. In March 2017, Thorne joined the cast of the black comedy film, Assassination Nation, which was released in theaters on September 21, 2018. In the same year, Thorne starred in the Netflix original film, You Get Me and made an appearance on Prince Fox's single "Just Call". In October of that year, Thorne appeared in the slasher comedy The Babysitter, directed by McG and released directly to Netflix. She reprised her role in the sequel The Babysitter: Killer Queen.

=== 2018–present: Acting projects, music return and directorial debut ===
Thorne starred in the romantic drama Midnight Sun, based on the 2006 Japanese film of the same name and released on March 23, 2018. She also contributed five songs to the soundtrack, including the lead single "Burn So Bright" and fan favorite "Walk With Me". The next month, during the Coachella festival, she announced the launch of her own record label called Filthy Fangs. In August 2018, it was revealed that her record label has a partnership deal with Epic/Sony and she began work on her debut studio album titled What Do You See Now?.

In August 2019, Pornhub announced that Thorne would make her directorial debut on its network. The film, Her & Him, was screened at the Oldenburg Film Festival September 11–20, 2019. In November 2019, Thorne won a Vision Award at the second annual PornHub Awards in Los Angeles for Her & Him. In her acceptance speech, Thorne revealed a partnership with Pornhub to implement a change in the company's flagging algorithm.

In 2020, Thorne competed as "Swan" in the third season of The Masked Singer. She was eliminated on her second appearance and reminded Ken Jeong about their work together in The DUFF. She also starred alongside Jake Manley in the heist-thriller Infamous which was released on June 12, 2020. She received praise for her performance, with critic Nick Allen states that she had "the classically great presence of someone like Sandra Bullock, but with her own scraggly edge ... Thorne dominates numerous scenes that catapult her character from clout-hungry wannabe to gun-selfie superstar."

In November 2020, Thorne starred in the thriller Girl, directed by Chad Faust. The movie itself received mixed reviews but critics entitled this to be Thorne's best performance to date. In the same month, she also starred in the action comedy film Chick Fight alongside Malin Akerman and Alec Baldwin and directed by Paul Leyden.

In 2021, Thorne played Lily in season 1 of Amazon Prime Video's Paradise City. She also starred in other projects, such as Masquerade and Time Is Up. In the same year, Thorne starred and served as an executive producer on the film Habit, which is directed by Janell Shirtcliff, Measure of Revenge opposite Melissa Leo, directed by Jordan Galland, and The Trainer directed by Tony Kaye.

in May 2025, Thorne was announced to star in a sequel to Harmony Korine's 2012 film Spring Breakers, with Matthew Bright directing. In August 2026, Thorne took over directing and writing the film as well.

=== Writing ===
In addition to her acting and singing careers, Thorne is also a published writer. In 2014, she wrote Autumn Falls, the first in a series of three young adult novels. The following entries were Autumn's Kiss (2015) and Autumn's Wish (2016). The series follows a teenage girl who navigates through the pitfalls of adolescence with help from her diary, which may have links to the supernatural.

In July 2019, Rare Bird Books published The Life of a Wannabe Mogul: Mental Disarray Vol. 1, a book of Thorne's autobiographical poetry.

=== OnlyFans ===
In August 2020, Thorne joined OnlyFans and became the first person to earn $1 million in the first 24 hours of joining the platform. She earned $2 million in less than a week. Her activities on OnlyFans sparked controversy after she offered $200 pay-per-view photos she claimed were "naked", but the photos were actually of her wearing lingerie, leading to a slew of chargebacks. OnlyFans reacted by issuing new restrictions site-wide that limited the amount that creators on the platform could charge and reduced creator payout frequency to monthly rather than weekly. However, OnlyFans denied the changes were related to Thorne. Thorne claimed she created an account as research for a role in an upcoming film with Sean Baker, which Baker denied. She also claimed that money made through the page would be used to fund her production company and distributed to worthy charitable causes. In 2021, she was the second-highest-earning content creator on the platform, earning $11 million a month.

== Public image ==
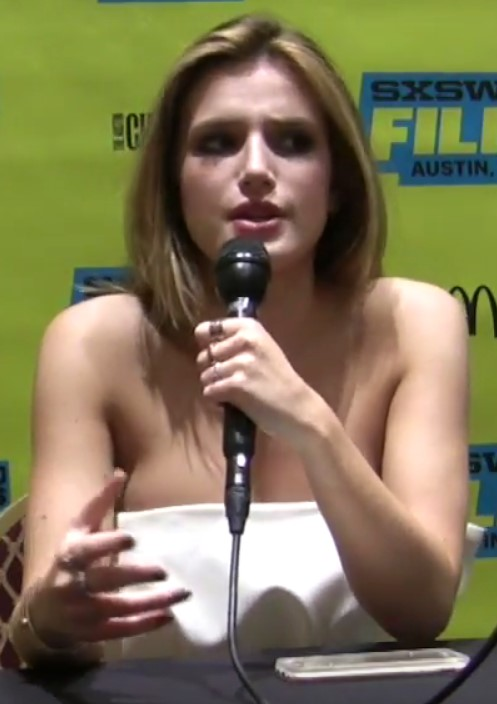
Thorne at South by Southwest in 2016

Thorne is recognized for holding a controversial public image. While working on Disney, she stated that she felt restricted, and that "I wish I would have been true to myself," and that "After Disney, I had the opportunity to find my true self and that is reflected in all my work from acting, producing, directing, and writing. I have more artistic freedom to continue to express myself."

Thorne has appeared in more than 30 commercials including Neutrogena and Texas Instruments. Her advertising campaigns include Guess Jeans, Tommy Hilfiger, J.Lo Girls, Candie's, Ralph Lauren, Gap and Diesel. She has been on the magazine covers of US's Shape, Seventeen, Teen Vogue, Latina and Gay Times, UK's Company; Indonesia's Marie Claire and CosmoGirl; Canada's Elle and Mexico's Glamour and GQ. She has appeared in music videos for Liam Payne's "Bedroom Floor", Bhad Bhabie's "Trust Me", Logan Paul's "Outta My Head", and Oliver Tree's "Cowboys Don't Cry".

Thorne is a supporter of the Humane Society, the Cystic Fibrosis Foundation, and The Nomad Organization, which provides education, food and medical supplies to children in Africa. She also joined PETA in encouraging people to boycott and protest SeaWorld, acknowledging that as a child she appeared in a commercial for the theme park.

== Personal life ==
Thorne stated that she had been sexually abused repeatedly between the ages of six and fourteen, and voiced her support for the Time's Up organization, focused on preventing such abuse.

Thorne dated Tristan Klier, then a student, from November 2011 until 2014. She dated English actor Gregg Sulkin from 2015 to August 2016. Shortly after the breakup, she came out as bisexual. Thorne started dating American actor Tyler Posey in September the same year and the pair split in November. In 2019, she came out as pansexual. In 2017, she dated emo rapper Lil Peep for a short period and was in a relationship with musician Blackbear in August that same year. She had a polyamorous relationship with musician Mod Sun and media personality Tana Mongeau, dating the latter from September 2017 to February 2019 and Mod Sun until April 2019. From April 2019 to June 2022, she was in a relationship with Italian singer Benjamin Mascolo, and they announced their engagement in March 2021. However, in June 2022, the couple officially announced their split. In May 2023, Thorne announced her engagement to entrepreneur and Bad Vegan producer Mark Emms.

In June 2019, Thorne had nude photos stolen by hackers who subsequently threatened her with extortion; she instead released the photographs herself. Later that year, she addressed the issue of pornographic deepfakes.

In a 2021 interview with Bloody Disgusting, Thorne stated that she has been a life-long fan of the horror genre.

== Recognition ==
She was recognized as one of the BBC's 100 Women of 2019.

== Bibliography ==
Autumn Falls novels:

- Autumn Falls (Delacorte Press, 2014) ISBN 978-0385744331
- Autumn's Kiss (Delacorte Press, 2015) ISBN 978-0385744355
- Autumn's Wish (Delacorte Press, 2016) ISBN 978-0385744379

Poetry:

- The Life of a Wannabe Mogul: Mental Disarray (Rare Bird Books, 2019) ISBN 978-1644280560

== Discography ==
=== Extended plays ===
- Made in Japan (2012)
- Jersey (2014)

== Awards and nominations ==
| Year | Award | Category | Work | Result | Ref. |
|---|---|---|---|---|---|
| 2008 | Young Artist Awards | Best Performance in a TV Series – Guest Starring Young Actress | The O.C. | Nominated | |
| 2009 | Young Artist Awards | Best Performance in a TV Series – Guest Starring Young Actress | October Road | Nominated | |
| 2009 | Young Artist Awards | Best Performance in a TV Series (Comedy or Drama) – Supporting Young Actress | My Own Worst Enemy | Won | |
| 2010 | Young Artist Awards | Best Performance in a TV Series – Guest Starring Young Actress | Mental | Nominated | |
| 2011 | Young Artist Awards | Best Performance in a TV Series (Comedy or Drama) – Leading Young Actress | Shake It Up | Won | |
| 2011 | Young Artist Awards | Outstanding Young Ensemble in a TV Series (shared with cast) | Shake It Up | Nominated | |
| 2011 | Young Artist Awards | Best Performance in a TV Series – Guest Starring Young Actress 11–15 | Wizards of Waverly Place | Nominated | |
| 2011 | Young Artist Awards | Best Performance in a TV Series – Recurring Young Actress 11–16 | Big Love | Nominated | |
| 2011 | Imagen Awards | Best Young Actress – Television | Shake It Up | Nominated | |
| 2012 | Young Artist Awards | Best Performance in a TV Series – Leading Young Actress | Shake It Up | Nominated | |
| 2012 | Young Artist Awards | Outstanding Young Ensemble in a TV Series (shared with cast) | Shake It Up | Nominated | |
| 2012 | Imagen Awards | Best Young Actress – Television | Shake It Up | Won | |
| 2012 | ALMA Awards | Favorite TV Actress – Comedy | Shake It Up | Nominated | |
| 2013 | Young Artist Awards | Best Performance in a TV Movie, MiniSeries, Special or Pilot – Leading Young Actress | Frenemies | Won | |
| 2013 | Young Hollywood Awards | One to Watch | Herself | Won | |
| 2014 | Young Hollywood Awards | You're So Fancy | Herself | Won | |
| 2014 | Young Hollywood Awards | Best Social Media Superstar | Herself | Nominated | |
| 2014 | Teen Choice Awards | Choice Female Hottie | Herself | Nominated | |
| 2015 | Shorty Awards | Actress | Herself | Won | |
| 2015 | Teen Choice Awards | Choice Movie: Villain | The DUFF | Won | |
| 2015 | Teen Choice Awards | Choice TV: Scene Stealer | Scream | Nominated | |
| 2017 | Teen Choice Awards | Choice TV Actress: Drama | Famous in Love | Nominated | |
| 2017 | Teen Choice Awards | Choice Summer Movie Actress | Amityville: The Awakening | Nominated | |
| 2018 | Teen Choice Awards | Choice TV Actress: Drama | Famous in Love | Nominated | |
| 2018 | Teen Choice Awards | Choice Drama Movie Actress | Midnight Sun | Nominated | |
| 2018 | Teen Choice Awards | Choice Movie Ship | Bella Thorne & Patrick Schwarzenegger – Midnight Sun | Nominated | |
| 2019 | 2nd Pornhub Awards | Visionary Award | Her & Him | Won | |
| 2019 | German Independence Award | Best Short Film | Her & Him | Nominated | |
| 2020 | 37th AVN Awards | Best Dramatic Screenplay | Her & Him | Nominated | |
| 2020 | 37th AVN Awards | Best Featurette | Her & Him | Nominated | |
| 2020 | XBIZ Awards | Best Art Direction | Her & Him | Nominated | |

== See also ==
- List of celebrities who own cannabis businesses
