= Shake It Up (Indian TV series) =

2013 Indian Sitcom

- Created by: Chris Thompson
- Starring: Sparsh Shrivastava; Ojas Godatwar; Preet Rajput; Alam Khan; Ridhi Arora; Ayush Narang; Asawari Joshi
- Theme music composer: Jeanne Lurie, Aris Archontis and Chen Neeman
- Opening theme: "Shake It Up"
- Ending theme: "Shake It Up" (second verse)
- Composers: Eric Goldman; Zed Kelley; Ken Lofkoll; Michael Corcoran
- Country of origin: India
- Original language: Hindi

Production
- Executive producer: Chris Thompson
- Camera setup: Videotape (filmized); Multi-camera
- Running time: 23 minutes
- Production company: SOL

Original release
- Network: Disney Channel
- Release: 30 March – 2 November 2013

Related
- Shake It Up (American TV series)

Shake It Up is an Indian sitcom airing on Disney Channel India. The series premiered on 30 March 2013. It is an Indian adaptation of the American television series of the same name. The series was created by Chris Thompson.

It revolves around the misadventures of best friends Neel (Neeladri) Walia and Yash (Yashpal) Mehta, two confident and energetic 13-year-olds who are skilled dancers and are on the threshold of taking their steps into the world of professional dancing.

== Cast and characters ==
=== Main ===
- Sparsh Shrivastava as Neeladri "Neel" Walia: He is the equivalent of CeCe Jones, portrayed by Bella Thorne.
- Ojas Godatwar as Yashpal "Yash" Mehta: He is the equivalent of Rocky Blue, portrayed by Zendaya.
- Asawari Joshi as S.P Kiran Walia: She is the equivalent of Georgia Jones, portrayed by Anita Barone.
- Faiq Shaikh as Ayush Walia: He is the equivalent of Flynn Jones, portrayed by Davis Cleveland.
- Preet Rajput as Jay Mehta: He is the equivalent of Ty Blue, portrayed by Roshon Fegan.
- Alam Khan as Dheeraj Dambole: He is the equivalent of Deuce Martinez, portrayed by Adam Irigoyen.
- Raj Saluja as Shekhar Grover: He is the equivalent of Gary Wilde, portrayed by R. Brandon Johnson.

=== Recurring ===
- Ayush Narang as Manjot "Jo" Dhillon: He is the equivalent of Gunther Hessenheffer, portrayed by Kenton Duty.
- Ridhi Arora as Mandeep "Di" Dhillon: She is the equivalent of Tinka Hessenheffer, portrayed by Caroline Sunshine.
- Goolshan Mazdiaani as Batiwala Aunty: She is the equivalent of Mrs. Loccasio, portrayed by Renée Taylor.
- Ayesha Kaduskar as Dina Shah: She is the equivalent of Dina Garcia, portrayed by Ainsley Bailey.

== Promotion ==
A promotional music video with the cast of the film ABCD: Any Body Can Dance and Shake It Up aired on the channel in January 2013.

== See also ==
- List of Disney Channel (India) series
