= Rowan Atkinson filmography =

Filmography of English actor, comedian and writer Rowan Atkinson

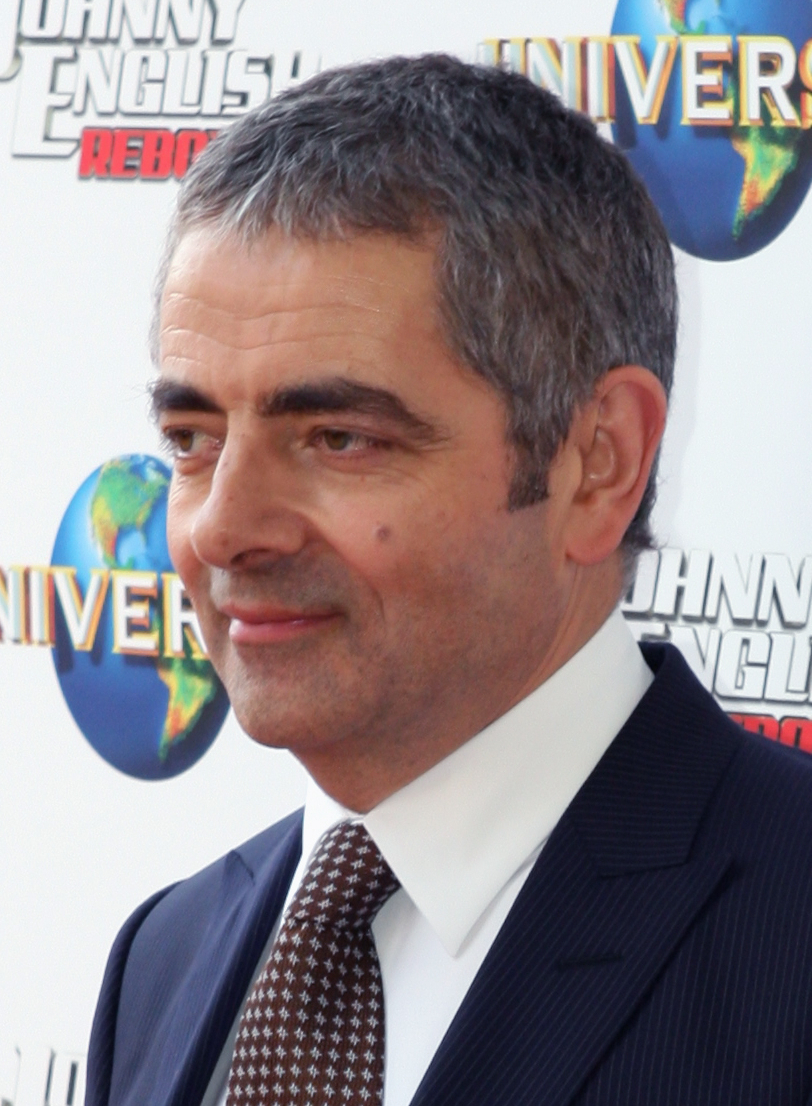
- Atkinson at the Johnny English Reborn premiere in 2011
- Film: 23
- Television series: 39
- Music videos: 5
- Advertising: 13

English actor and comedian Rowan Atkinson has appeared in twenty films, over thirty film series, and over ten television advertisements.

Key
†	Denotes films that have not yet been released

== Film ==
Year	Title	Role	Notes
1981	Fundamental Frolics	Himself	
1982	Mr. Kershaw's Dream System	Mr. Kershaw	Short promotional film
1983	Dead on Time	Bernard Fripp	Short film
1983	Never Say Never Again	Nigel Small-Fawcett	
1988	The Appointments of Dennis Jennings	Dr. Schooner	Short film
1989	The Tall Guy	Ron Anderson	
1990	The Witches	Mr. Stringer	
1993	Hot Shots! Part Deux	Dexter Hayman	
1994	Four Weddings and a Funeral	Father Gerald	
1994	The Lion King	Zazu	Voice
1997	Bean	Mr. Bean	Also executive producer
2000	Maybe Baby	Mr. James	
2001	Rat Race	Enrico Pollini	
2002	Scooby-Doo	Emile Mondavarious	
2003	Johnny English	Johnny English	
2003	Love Actually	Rufus	
2005	Keeping Mum	Reverend Walter Goodfellow	
2007	Mr. Bean's Holiday	Mr. Bean	
2011	Johnny English Reborn	Johnny English	
2017	Top Funny Comedian: The Movie	Mr. Bean	Cameo
2018	Johnny English Strikes Again	Johnny English	Also producer
2023	Wonka	Father Julius	
TBA	Johnny English 4 †	Johnny English	Announced in February 2024. Current status unknown.

== Television ==
List of Rowan Atkinson television credits
Year	Title	Role(s)	Notes
1979	Rowan Atkinson presents… Canned Laughter	Robert Box/Mr. Marshall/Dave Perry	One-off Pilot episode; also writer
1979	The Secret Policeman's Ball	Himself	Television special
1979–1982	Not the Nine O'Clock News	Various roles	28 episodes; also writer
1980	Peter Cook & Co	Various roles	Television special
1980	The Innes Book of Records		1 episode
1981	The Secret Policeman's Other Ball	Various roles	Television special
1983–1989	Blackadder	Edmund Blackadder	24 episodes + unaired pilot; also co-creator and writer
1986	Saturday Live	Himself (host)	1 episode
1987	The Grand Knockout Tournament	Lord Knock of Alton	Television special
1990–1995	Mr. Bean	Mr. Bean	14 episodes + clip show special; also co-creator and writer
1991	Bernard and the Genie	Charles Pinkworth (Bernard's Boss)	Television film
1991	The Driven Man	Himself	Television documentary; also writer
1992	Rowan Atkinson Live	Himself	Television special; also writer
1992	Funny Business	Kevin / Narrator	6 episodes; also writer
1992	A Bit of Fry & Laurie	Guest	1 episode
1992	Laughing Matters	Himself (host)	Television documentary
1995	Full Throttle	Sir Henry 'Tim' Birkin	TV movie
1995–1996	The Thin Blue Line	Inspector Raymond Fowler	14 episodes
1996	Late Night with Conan O'Brien	Himself	Guest; 1 episode
1999	Blackadder: Back & Forth	Lord Blackadder / King Edmund III / Centurion Blaccadius	Television film
1999	Doctor Who and the Curse of Fatal Death	The Doctor	Television special
2001	Popsters	Nasty Neville	Television short
2002–2004, 2015–2016, 2018–2019, 2025–2026	Mr. Bean: The Animated Series	Mr. Bean (voice)	182 episodes and 1 minisode; also executive producer
2003	Lying to Michael Jackson	Martin Bashir	Television short
2005	Spider-Plant Man	Peter Piper / Spider-Plant Man	Television short
2010	Bondi Rescue	Mr. Bean	1 episode
2012	The Olympics Opening Ceremony	Himself/Mr. Bean	Television special
2013	Live from Lambeth Palace sketches	The Archbishop of Canterbury	Television special
2015	Mr. Bean: Funeral	Mr. Bean	Television short
2015	Horrible Histories	Henry VIII of England	1 episode
2016–2017	Maigret	Jules Maigret	4 episodes
2017	Red Nose Day Actually	Rufus	Television short
2017	British Airways Safety Video: Director's Cut	Mr. Bean	Television short
2018–2020	Handy Bean	Mr. Bean	20 episodes
2018, 2025	The Graham Norton Show	Himself	Guest; 2 episodes
2018	The Late Show with Stephen Colbert	Himself	Guest; 1 episode
2019	One Red Nose Day and a Wedding	Father Gerald	Television short
2022	Man vs Bee	Trevor Bingley	9 episodes; also co-creator
2025	Man vs Baby	Trevor Bingley	4 episodes; also co-creator and writer

== Commercials ==
Year	Title	Role
1980	Kronenbourg 1664	Customs officer
1983	Appletiser	Fisherman
1989	Give Blood	Doctor
1991–1997	Barclaycard	Richard Latham
1994	REMA 1000	Mr. Bean
1996	BBC TV licence	Inspector Raymond Fowler
1997	M&M's	Mr. Bean
1999	Nissan Tino	Mr. Bean
1999	Fujifilm	Mr. Bean
2014	Snickers	Mr. Bean
2018	Etisalat	Agent One
2019	Etisalat	Mr. Bean
2024	Migros	Chocolatier

== Music videos ==
Year	Artist	Title	Role
1991	Hale and Pace	"The Stonk"	Mr. Bean
1992	Mr. Bean and Smear Campaign	"(I Want To Be) Elected" (featuring Bruce Dickinson)	Mr. Bean
1997	Boyzone	"Picture of You"	Mr. Bean
2007	Matt Willis	"Crash"	Mr. Bean
2018	Olly Murs	"Moves" (Note: "Moves" also features on the Johnny English Strikes Again OST.) (featuring Snoop Dogg)	Bartender
