= Shake It Up season 3 =

Shake It Up
- Season 3
- No. of episodes: 26

Release
- Original network: Disney Channel
- Original release: October 14, 2012 – November 10, 2013

Season chronology
- ← Previous; Season 2

The third and final season of Shake It Up premiered on Disney Channel on October 14, 2012. Kenton Duty is not a main cast member in this season and has been removed from the opening credits. This is the final season of the series, with the series finale airing on November 10, 2013.

== Production and release ==
On June 4, 2012, the series was renewed for its third season. Filming for the season began in July 2012 and ended in March 2013. It was announced that Kenton Duty would be removed from the main cast and would not appear in the opening credits. In September 2012, the season was announced to premiere in October. The third season officially premiered on October 14, 2012 and aired its last episode on November 10, 2013 with 26 episodes aired for the season. Rob Lotterstein returned as executive producer and showrunner. Jeff Strauss didn't return and was replaced by Eileen Conn, while Season 2 writer Darin Henry filled Conn's position as co-executive producer. Consulting producer, David Holden, was succeeded by Melissa & Joey writer Jennifer Glickman.

== Synopsis ==
In the season premiere, Shake It Up, Chicago is on hiatus due to the stage being burned down. Everyone tries to investigate the problem of how the stage got burnt. Plus, Tinka tries to be nice to Rocky and CeCe after Gunther moves to the old country. At the end, she, Rocky, and CeCe become friends. The problem is finally solved when one of the firemen says that a tanning bed was the reason why the stage got burnt and Gary ends up being the perpetrator because he forgot to turn it off when they went to Japan. CeCe and Rocky try to find other things to do since they can't perform on the show for a while, but they begin to fall into a "funk stage." In the episode "Quit It Up," the stage has finally re-opened, but everyone has to re-audition for the show. In the episode "Ty It Up," Gary has been replaced with a new producer, Phil, who makes everyone re-audition. Ty tries to become a dancer on the show which affects Rocky. Phil will only let one of them be on the show which causes a feud between the two of them. Ty unexpectedly becomes the new host of the show, but Rocky still doesn't get the gig. In the episode "Forward and Back It Up," Rocky saves Phil's life when he chokes on a meatball. He then gives her the job back on the show, but Rocky wants to earn it by re-auditioning. She finally decides to take her job back and is now back on the show. Georgia starts dating firefighter Jeremy Hunter, and they subsequently get engaged and plan a wedding. Jeremy has a son, Logan (Leo Howard) who clashes with CeCe, but becomes a love interest of Rocky. At the Jones/Hunter wedding, Georgia and Jeremy break up at the altar and Rocky and Logan start dating. The couple break up a few episodes later after Logan won't make an effort to befriend CeCe.

== Opening sequence ==
Selena Gomez sings the theme song. The opening theme starts with Rocky and CeCe dancing in grass skirts (as shown in "Boot It Up"), then showing various clips of the cast members (some clips from the previous seasons are also included), starting off with Zendaya and Bella Thorne, then going in order with Davis Cleveland, Roshon Fegan, Adam Irigoyen, and Caroline Sunshine. Kenton Duty is not a main cast member in this season, so he is not included in the credits. It then shows more various clips of the cast members as it gives credit to the creator of the series, Chris Thompson. A final clip shows the same thing that was shown in the previous seasons, but Rocky and CeCe are wearing different outfits. The theme song is also shortened only in this season.

== Music ==
The third soundtrack "Shake It Up: I Love Dance" was released on March 5, 2013. "This Is My Dance Floor" was released as a promotional single on February 12, 2013. "Contagious Love" was released on February 19, 2013 as the first single from the soundtrack with an accompanying music video released on March 1, 2013 during an episode of Jessie.

== Cast ==
- Bella Thorne as CeCe Jones
- Zendaya as Rocky Blue
- Davis Cleveland as Flynn Jones
- Roshon Fegan as Ty Blue
- Adam Irigoyen as Deuce Martinez
- Caroline Sunshine as Tinka Hessenheffer

== Episodes ==
- Kenton Duty is no longer a main cast member and is removed from the opening credits.
- Buddy Handleson is no longer appearing on the show as a recurring character. He was also dismissed from the show after the second season finale along with Kenton Duty.
- This season filmed from July 2012 to March 2013.
- This season started during 2012's Monstober along with Make Your Mark.
- This season played the shortened version of the theme song.

No. overall	No. in season	Title	Directed by	Written by	Original release date	Prod. code	US viewers (millions)
50	1	"Fire It Up"	Joel Zwick	Rob Lotterstein	October 14, 2012	301	3.88
CeCe and Rocky are horrified when they discover that a fire burned down the Shake It Up, Chicago! set. Since CeCe was the last one on the set and left her curling iron plugged in before they left for Japan, she believes she is the culprit. Unable to use the set, the show goes on hiatus. Meanwhile, Gary is depressed because he is jobless, so Ty convinces Deuce to hire him at Crusty's Pizza. Tinka tries to be nice to Rocky and CeCe after Gunther returns to the old country. In the end, Rocky and CeCe accepts Tinka's friendship, and it is revealed that a faulty tanning bed caused the fire. Special guest star: Elektrolytes as themselves Guest stars: R. Brandon Johnson as Gary Wilde, Anita Barone as Georgia Jones, Anthony Starke as Jeremy Hunter Songs featured: "Calling All Monsters" by China Anne McClain, "Law of Averages" by TKO and Nevermind Notes: Starting this season, Kenton Duty, who plays Gunther Hessenheffer, is no longer a main cast member and departs from the series. This is also the first episode that showed the shortened version of the series' theme song.
51	2	"Funk It Up"	Joel Zwick	Eileen Conn	October 28, 2012	302	3.15
CeCe is in a funk without Shake It Up! Chicago. She gets inspired by a speech performed at a bar mitzvah where Rocky booked them a gig. Meanwhile, Howie, a boy Rocky met at the bar mitzvah, develops a huge crush on her and will not leave her alone. Plus, Ty gets incredibly mad at Deuce because he drew a mustache on his face with permanent marker. Also, Flynn asks Jeremy to speak at Career Day instead of Georgia, which makes her upset. Guest stars: Anita Barone as Georgia Jones, Anthony Starke as Jeremy Hunter, Aaron Refvem as Jason, Adam Karelin as Howie, Robert Koch as Photographer Song featured: "Get'cha Head in the Game" by Bella Thorne Absent: Caroline Sunshine as Tinka Hessenheffer
52	3	"Spirit It Up"	Joel Zwick	Darin Henry	November 4, 2012	303	3.23
Now with Rocky in a funk without Shake It Up, Chicago!, CeCe tries helping her out. When they are out of choices, they witness how horrible and emotionless the spirit squad is, so they decide to join. Later on, the squad promotes CeCe as president and they want her to kick Rocky out when they realize how bossy and demanding she is. Meanwhile, Deuce feels bad for Tinka since Gunther left. He persuades Dina into letting her hang out with them. However, Deuce gets annoyed when Dina and Tinka spend every minute together and he feels like the third wheel. Elsewhere, Flynn is offended when is known for having a bad friend reputation, so he attempts to make friends with a nerd living next door. Guest stars: Ainsley Bailey as Dina Garcia, Luke Ganalon as Freckles, Brittany Ross as Crystal, Carla Jeffery as Margie Song featured: "I Can Do Better" by Y.L.A. Absent: Roshon Fegan as Ty Blue
53	4	"Lock It Up"	Joel Zwick	Jenny Lee	November 11, 2012	304	3.06
After CeCe and Rocky perform at a local hospital, it inspires Rocky to volunteer to work in the hospital. While cleaning a hospital room, she is locked under quarantine alongside Flynn. Dr. Curtis Blue tells Rocky that the hospital is not sure if the disease is infectious, the test results will arrive within sixty hours. Meanwhile, CeCe asks out Louis (Chase Austin) for pizza, unbeknownst he is blind. When CeCe finds out, Louis believes she is self-absorbed. Elsewhere, Deuce gets annoyed because Dina is invading his locker. Guest stars: Ainsley Bailey as Dina Garcia, Phil Morris as Curtis Blue, Chase Austin as Louis Song featured: "Contagious Love" by Miranda R. Johnson Absent: Caroline Sunshine as Tinka Hessenheffer
54	5	"Merry Merry It Up"	Joel Zwick	Jennifer Glickman	December 2, 2012	306	3.85
CeCe picks a fight with Jeremy after she accuses him of changing their Christmas traditions and dislikes how he is changing the family, leading Georgia to break up with him. That night, CeCe has a dream where the ghost of Christmas dance that looks like Rocky appears and escorts CeCe on a dream journey to the past, present, and future. Meanwhile, Flynn wins a hot tub after being the tenth caller on a radio station. Elsewhere, Deuce gets left behind by his family, and instead of going on a vacation to Cabo, he ends up spending Christmas with the Blue family much more to Ty's dismay than to Deuce's. Song featured: "Shake Santa Shake" by Zendaya Absent: Caroline Sunshine as Tinka Hessenheffer
55	6	"Home Alone It Up"	Joel Zwick	Jenn Lloyd & Kevin Bonani	December 9, 2012	305	3.21
CeCe convinces Georgia to leave her watching Flynn so she can meet Jeremy's parents after she convinces her that she is "responsible", but when a last minute shoe sale comes up, she puts Rocky in charge even though she is incredibly ill. After CeCe returns from her shopping spree, the house is a complete disaster and Flynn is nowhere to be found. Now, CeCe and Rocky set out to find him before Georgia finds out. Song featured: "Afterparty" by Roshon Fegan and Caroline Sunshine Absent: Caroline Sunshine as Tinka Hessenheffer
56	7	"Oh Brother It Up"	Rosario J. Roveto, Jr.	Rob Lotterstein	January 13, 2013	307	3.27
CeCe and Rocky get a job at Bob's Kabobs, but CeCe is fired by her boss and the manager named Logan (Leo Howard). CeCe finds out that Logan is the son of her mother's boyfriend, Jeremy when Logan shows up to her apartment for Jeremy's birthday celebration unbeknownst that CeCe is the daughter of his dad's girlfriend. During dinner, Jeremy proposes to Georgia and she says yes, so when Logan and CeCe put two and two together, they eventually find out that they will be step-siblings. Meanwhile, Tinka tries to bake the perfect cake for Jeremy. Absent: Roshon Fegan as Ty Blue, Adam Irigoyen as Deuce Martinez
57	8	"Quit It Up"	Joel Zwick	Jenny Lee	January 27, 2013	308	3.41
CeCe must avoid quitting an embarrassing job because Logan thinks she is a quitter. Meanwhile the girls learn some new information about the future of Shake It Up, Chicago!: the new stage has been finished, but they learn they must re-audition to be back in the show. Song featured: "This is My Dance Floor" by Zendaya and Bella Thorne Note: This episode is a cliffhanger of the ninth episode "Ty It Up". Absent: Roshon Fegan as Ty Blue, Adam Irigoyen as Deuce Martinez
58	9	"Ty It Up"	Joel Zwick	Eileen Conn	February 17, 2013	309	4.50
CeCe, Rocky and Tinka re-audition for Shake It Up, Chicago!. Ty also auditions to be Tinka's dance partner since Gunther has moved back to the old country. This causes Ty to announce that he actually wants to be on Shake it Up, Chicago!. When the producer announces the list of dancers, CeCe and Tinka both got in, but there was some confusion about whether Rocky or Ty got in. Now it is between Rocky and Ty for the last spot on Shake it Up, Chicago!. In the end, Ty becomes the new host, but Rocky does not get the last spot on Shake It Up, Chicago! anyway because the producer wanted new faces and had already chosen CeCe and Tinka. Songs featured: "Bring the Fire" by Ylwa, "The Star I R" by Caroline Sunshine, "Move Like Magic" by Adam Trent, "These Boots Are Made for Walkin'" originally by Nancy Sinatra, performed by Olivia Holt Notes: This episode is the continuation of the eighth episode "Quit It Up". The teaser scene of this episode begins with a recap sequence of the first, second, and eighth episodes of the season. Elsewhere, Ty's new dressing room is supposed to be Gary Wilde's former dressing room, even though in the episode "Throw It Up", it was shown differently. Absent: Adam Irigoyen as Deuce Martinez
59	10	"My Fair Librarian It Up"	Alfonso Ribeiro	Jennifer Glickman	February 24, 2013	310	3.73
Carly Rae Jepsen visits Shake It Up, Chicago! and she performs Sweetie. After the intro, a school librarian Ms. Burke (Tyra Banks) falls in love with a fellow teacher Mr. Zigfield (Alfonso Ribeiro, the episode's director) and Rocky and CeCe help her out by giving her a new look. Meanwhile, Logan meets Ty and Deuce when Flynn asks them to come and help with his soapbox car; however, Ty becomes jealous when Deuce thinks Logan is cool. Later, Rocky says the word "dance" and CeCe realizes that she really misses dancing on Shake It Up, Chicago!. Special guest stars: Carly Rae Jepsen as herself, Tyra Banks as Ms. Burke, Alfonso Ribeiro as Mr. Zigfield Song featured: "Sweetie" by Carly Rae Jepsen Absent: Caroline Sunshine as Tinka Hessenheffer
60	11	"Clean It Up"	Joel Zwick	Darin Henry	March 10, 2013	311	3.24
CeCe accidentally stains Georgia's wedding dress with tanning lotion. Meanwhile, Rocky tries to get Logan to get along with CeCe by making a deal that if he keeps an open mind about CeCe, she will teach him how to slow dance for Georgia's wedding. During the dance lesson, Rocky "accidentally" kisses Logan, which results in him kissing her back. Absent: Adam Irigoyen as Deuce Martinez, Caroline Sunshine as Tinka Hessenheffer
61	12	"I Do It Up"	Joel Zwick	Rob Lotterstein	March 17, 2013	312	4.46
The night before Georgia's wedding, her ex-husband, J.J., comes to visit to have some quality family time, but things take an unexpected twist when Flynn witnesses Georgia and J.J. kissing. Flynn has no idea if he should speak up or stay quiet. Meanwhile, Logan tries to discuss his relationship with Rocky, but Ty keeps interfering. In the end, Georgia and Jeremy mutually call off their wedding after Jeremy admits he was also having second thoughts. Song featured: "I Do" by Drew Seeley Note: This episode features a parody of the famed JK Wedding Entrance Dance.
62	13	"Forward and Back It Up"	Joel Zwick	Jennifer Glickman & Darin Henry	March 24, 2013	313	2.74
Rocky saves Phil's life and he happily gives her back her job, but wanting to earn her way, Rocky refuses and decides to re-audition. In the end, Rocky is back on Shake It Up, Chicago!. Meanwhile, Flynn and Deuce run a museum inside Crusty's. Song featured: "I'm Back" by Zendaya
63	14	"Switch It Up"	Joel Zwick	Cat Davis & Eddie Quintana	April 7, 2013	317	3.27
Tinka accidentally swaps CeCe and Flynn's bodies by an old curse of her Grandma's which Grandma used when she and Gunther used to argue with each other. Meanwhile Rocky tries to kill Ty because he does not put her in the Shake it Up Dance that week. However CeCe is really dreaming all of it. Song featured: "Freaky Freakend" by Coco Jones Note: This episode was part of Disney Channel's Freaky Freakend.
64	15	"Love and War It Up"	Joel Zwick	Jenny Lee	April 28, 2013	316	3.06
Now that they're no longer going to be related, Rocky tries to convince CeCe and Logan to get along so that she and Logan can date. CeCe finally agrees to try, but Logan just can't do it. Rocky dumps him, saying she can't date a guy that won't give her best friend a chance. Meanwhile, Flynn and Deuce invite Tinka to be the lead singer in their air guitar band. Songs featured: "The Same Heart", "Contagious Love" by Bella Thorne and Zendaya Absent: Roshon Fegan as Ty Blue
65	16	"In the Bag It Up"	Alfonso Ribeiro	David Tolentino	May 12, 2013	314	2.63
Rocky, CeCe, and Tinka split the cost of renting a designer purse. Meanwhile, Deuce and his dad (George Lopez) play in a bowling tournament, but find out that Dina is on the other team. Plus, Tinka's fashion nemesis Kristin fights with her over who has the best clothes, but Kristin wins and Tinka loses. Guest star: Sammi Hanratty as Kristin Song featured: "Sharp as a Razor" by the McClain Sisters Note: The bag Rocky, CeCe, and Tinka rent is a real life Reed Krakoff Boxer handbag, available at Saks Fifth Avenue
66	17	"Brain It Up"	Alfonso Ribeiro	Jenn Lloyd & Kevin Bonani	June 2, 2013	315	2.95
When Rocky is removed from her honors classes, she starts to embrace the easier life style. CeCe takes Rocky's place in the honors classes. In the end, Rocky's score is revealed to be a 111 and is put back in her usual classes. CeCe learns to not doubt her and her ability. Due to this, Rocky and Cece are in the same classes. Absent: Roshon Fegan as Ty Blue, Caroline Sunshine as Tinka Hessenheffer
67	18	"Opposites Attract It Up"	Joel Zwick	Eileen Conn	June 23, 2013	318	3.36
CeCe goes on a date with a boy called James. After their date, CeCe realizes she might actually like James, but she thinks that he is too smart for her. Meanwhile, Rocky teaches Flynn's class in which the kids hate her and Deuce starts to grow a mustache in which Dina doesn't like. Absent: Caroline Sunshine as Tinka Hessenheffer
68	19	"Psych It Up"	Rosario J. Roveto, Jr.	Rob Lotterstein	July 14, 2013	319	3.45
After James breaks up with her, CeCe visits a psychic, Madame Tiffany, who tells her she's going to meet the love of her life on Wednesday at the corner of Monroe and Michigan's. CeCe is determined to meet the love of her life, but Rocky tells her that psychics are fake and attempts to prove it by giving their classmate, Margie, a fake psychic reading. However, when Rocky's predictions come true, Rocky becomes convinced that she is a true psychic and dubs herself "Madame Raquela". On Wednesday, CeCe meets the "love of her life", a puppy whom she takes home with her. Upset that the love of her life isn't a human, CeCe learns that the puppy (named Taco) is actually a dog owned by a boy named Monroe, whom is visiting from Michigan. Monroe asks her out, and CeCe accepts. Meanwhile, Flynn becomes convinced he is the reincarnation of George Washington after a reading from Madame Tiffany. Guest stars: Noah Centineo as Monroe, Yvette Nicole Brown as Madame Tiffany Song featured: "Holla at the DJ" by Coco Jones Absent: Caroline Sunshine as Tinka Hessenheffer
69	20	"Future It Up"	Alfonso Ribeiro	Eileen Conn	July 28, 2013	320	3.60
It's 22 years in the future and the groups' 20th high school reunion is just a day away. Rocky and Cece have lost touch 5 to 6 years ago. They are both very successful. Dina and Deuce are expecting their 8th baby. She goes into labor during the reunion and Rocky and Cece help her give birth. She gives birth to a girl with two eyebrows the first in the family. Rocky lives in New York with her husband Mark, an international spy, and their child. Cece is married to Logan and they have one child, L.J. (Logan Jr.). Ty is single and working for Flynn at a video game enterprise, the largest in the world. Tinka is single too and a fashion designer. Ty and Tinka realize they missed each other, and he asks her to marry him to which she happily accepts. Song featured: "Future Sounds Like Us" by Dove Cameron Note: Davis Cleveland, who portrays Flynn Jones, does not appear in this episode as his character. However, he appears as a different character named L.J., CeCe's son with her future husband Logan.
70	21	"Oui Oui It Up"	Alfonso Ribeiro	Jenny Lee	August 4, 2013	323	3.26
CeCe sets up a house swap with a French family. While Ty meets a beautiful French girl, and Tinka tells him that she's annoying.
71	22	"My Bitter Sweet 16 It Up"	Joel Zwick	Rob Lotterstein	August 25, 2013	325	3.18
Rocky and CeCe decide to make an amazing Sweet 16 party together, but they cannot do what they want to do because their mothers don't agree with their ideas. Marcie's ideas are very outdated and Georgia thinks her daughter's ideas are very flashy and expensive. However, when Cece discovers an old video of the 16th birthday of her mother, she gains a completely different perspective of it. Guest star: Olivia Holt as Young Georgia Song featured: "Beat of My Drum" by Zendaya
72	23	"Stress It Up"	Joel Zwick	Darin Henry	September 15, 2013	322	3.31
When CeCe gets picked to perform a song she wrote on "Shake It Up Chicago," she decides to stop talking all week in order to preserve her voice. Meanwhile, Rocky finally stretches herself too thin at school when she decides she should also add a sport to look good for college applications. Song featured: "Ring Ring (Hey Girls)" by Bella Thorne Absent: Adam Irigoyen as Deuce Martinez
73	24	"Loyal It Up"	Joel Zwick	Eileen Conn	September 29, 2013	324	3.04
Gary Wilde returns to announce he is hosting a new dance show – "Dance Factor" – and he wants CeCe, Rocky and Tinka to join the program. CeCe and Tinka promised Rocky that they wouldn't quit Shake It Up Chicago. So they try to get fired from Shake It Up by wrecking the Shake It Up billboard, but then get caught by Phil. Phil later reveals that he was going to be in charge of Dance Factor, therefore Gary Wilde came back to Shake It Up. Meanwhile, Deuce and Flynn panic after learning their favorite snack has been discontinued. Song featured: "Blow the System" by Bella Thorne
74	25	"Haunt It Up"	Kimberly McCullough	Alison Taylor	October 6, 2013	321	3.07
Rocky and CeCe decide they're too old to trick-or-treat and elect to have a "Mature-oween" with more adult activities, such as knitting and watching tear-jerking movies. They soon realize they're just missing out on fun and candy, and scramble to salvage what's left of their Halloween. Meanwhile, tired of being treated like a little kid, Flynn challenges Ty and Deuce to a scare off in an old abandoned house believed to be haunted by a young spirit. Song featured: "Let's Get Tricky" by Bella Thorne and Roshon Fegan Absent: Caroline Sunshine as Tinka Hessenheffer
75	26	"Remember Me" "Remember It Up"	Joel Zwick	Rob Lotterstein	November 10, 2013	326	3.36
When Shake It Up, Chicago hosts a fashion show with the girls as models, CeCe ends up in a tragic accident which leaves her with amnesia and as Rocky tells her in the hospital that she will be by her side, CeCe doesn't know who she is. Rocky tries everything to make CeCe remember their time together, but CeCe doesn't remember being friends with Rocky and assumes that Tinka is her BFF, leaving Rocky in devastation. After CeCe says something about Deuce, she starts to remember everything. At the end of the episode, they show pictures from each season. Meanwhile, Deuce wants everyone to call him Martin, but Dina doesn't approve. However, after CeCe remembers him by his nickname instead of his given name, Deuce realizes that he made a mistake in going back to Martin. Song featured: "Remember Me" by Zendaya Notes: This is the third episode (and the only standard-length episode) whose title doesn't end in "it up", the other two are "Shake It Up, Up & Away" and "Shake It Up: Made in Japan." In several countries, this episode's alternative name is titled "Remember It Up".
