= List of Shake It Up characters =

The main characters of Shake It Up (from left to right): Deuce Martinez, Ty Blue, CeCe Jones, Flynn Jones, Rocky Blue, Gunther Hessenheffer and Tinka Hessenheffer - Can also use cursor to identify.

Shake It Up is an American sitcom that originally aired on Disney Channel from November 7, 2010 to November 10, 2013. Created by Chris Thompson, the show follows the adventures of stars CeCe Jones (Bella Thorne) and Rocky Blue (Zendaya), who are background dancers on a local show, Shake It Up Chicago. It chronicles their misadventures on and off-set, their troubles, and their rising social status at school. Davis Cleveland, Roshon Fegan, Adam Irigoyen, Kenton Duty, and Caroline Sunshine star as other main cast members in the series. The show's original concept was for Disney to create a female buddy comedy with a dance aspect.

== Main characters ==
Character	Actor	Season		
Character	Actor	1	2	3
CeCe Jones	Bella Thorne	Main	Main	Main
Rocky Blue	Zendaya	Main	Main	Main
Flynn Jones	Davis Cleveland	Main	Main	Main
Ty Blue	Roshon Fegan	Main	Main	Main
Deuce Martinez	Adam Irigoyen	Main	Main	Main
Gunther Hessenheffer	Kenton Duty	Main	Main	
Tinka Hessenheffer	Caroline Sunshine	Recurring	Main	Main

=== CeCe Jones ===
Cecelia Jones, portrayed by Bella Thorne, is an impulsive and street-smart girl. She loves dancing as much as her best friend, Rocky, and they dance together. Initially, she performs poorly in school partially because of dyslexia (though this isn't revealed until later), but also in part because of her "trouble-making" behavior and her lack of motivation. She gradually improves academically as the series progresses. Being fearless, Cece is constantly getting into trouble. Despite her initially failing audition due to stage fright, she eventually earns a spot as a background dancer on the local dance show "Shake It Up Chicago".

In "Shrink it Up", it was revealed in a flashback that CeCe and Rocky met together in a ballet class when they were around 5 years old. It was there that they became best friends and CeCe gave her the nickname "Rocky", stating that it was easier to say than her real name, Raquel.

CeCe cares for her family very much. She loves her little brother Flynn, but is irresponsible when babysitting him, such as when she and Rocky forgot him at the park in season one, and when she forgot to buy ingredients for Flynn's cookies in season two. CeCe and Flynn are shown to have a love/hate relationship, but they comfort each other when the other is down. CeCe has a great relationship with her father, Jeremy Jones. The two share almost the same personality. CeCe and Flynn say their parents get along better when they're family.

CeCe's best relationship is with her mother, Georgia Jones. They fight sometimes, but always make up. CeCe helps Georgia take care of Flynn, and sometimes kisses up to her, such as in season one when she wanted a cell phone, and in season two when she wanted to go down to the movie studio her mom worked at and meet Taylor Lautner. In season three, CeCe desperately wanted her mom to find a boyfriend, so she and Rocky set her up with a husband named Jeremy Hunter. When Georgia and Jeremy become engaged, J, J's son, Logan ( Leo Howard) and CeCe agreed to put aside their differences so their parents could be happy. It turned out, though, that at the altar Georgia and Jeremy realized they didn't want to get married.

Overall, CeCe has a pretty bad romantic life aside from Season 3. In "Opposites Attract It Up", CeCe meets and starts dating James, who is the total opposite of CeCe. But in "Psych It Up", James breaks up with her before she can because they have nothing in common. Later on in the episode, she meets with a psychiatrist who tells her she will meet the love of her life soon. When CeCe goes to meet him, it turns out to be a dog who CeCe takes home. In the end though, the dog's owner, Monroe, takes home his dog and asks out CeCe. It is never confirmed if they broke up or not.

In "Future It Up", she and Logan are married and have a son named Logan Junior (LJ) who looks and acts like Flynn.

=== Rocky Blue ===
Raquel Oprah "Rocky" Blue, portrayed by Zendaya, is a book-smart girl whose heart belongs to dancing. She is a vegetarian and supporter of animal rights, as mentioned in "Meatball it Up". She is always trying to get CeCe out of trouble, which often gets them both into trouble. She is Ty's younger sister. Their dad is never seen until one Season 2 episode but is mentioned briefly by Ty throughout Season 1, explaining his absence, as he's always on business trips. Though Rocky's real name is Raquel, CeCe gave her the nickname "Rocky" when they first met, which eventually caught on with all of Rocky's friends and family.

Rocky does not take well to people disliking her, as seen in "Give it Up". Her father is a doctor for Doctors Without Borders. Her mom is a hair beautician in the episode "Heat It Up", and an ordained minister, via the internet in "I Do It Up". She and CeCe love Beyoncé. In "Merry Merry It Up" it was revealed by CeCe that her middle name is Oprah. Rocky is referred by others as freakishly tall for her age, while CeCe is freakishly short. Rocky is shown to love Taylor Lautner. She also seems to make a joke out of something at the wrong time, but sometimes she can make a joke that no one will usually catch on to.

It is shown in "Made in Japan" that she is "deathly afraid of flying", a fear she developed after she and CeCe had to dance on the wing of a plane. Rocky is usually pulled into CeCe's crazy schemes, and is usually punished with CeCe in the end. Rocky tries to be CeCe's voice of reason, but CeCe usually doesn't listen as she only follows her own rules. Ty, Deuce, Gunther and Tinka usually refer to Rocky as CeCe's sidekick.

Rocky's relationship with her family is strong. Rocky and her mother, Marcie, are on good terms, but her mother is overprotective when it comes to Rocky dating. Rocky and her father have a good relationship, and although he wants her to be a doctor, he sees how much Rocky loves to dance, and eventually accepts it. Rocky and her brother Ty have a great, and strong brother-sister bond. Ty is overprotective of his little sister, but at the same time, they can fight.

Rocky's romance life is just as bad as CeCe's. She hadn't had any major love interests until season three. CeCe's future stepbrother, Logan Hunter, asked Rocky to teach him how to slow dance, but while she was teaching him, she kissed him (twice) and he kissed her back. The two developed a crush on each other. At Georgia and Jeremy's wedding in "I Do It Up", Rocky accidentally reveals her kiss(es) with Logan to CeCe, Georgia, Marcie and Jeremy. As Jeremy and Logan leave the altar for the honeymoon, Logan tells Rocky to call him. She and Logan begin dating in "Love and War It Up", but she dumps him at the end when Logan refuses to be friends with CeCe.

In "Future It Up", Rocky is shown to be married to a spy named Mark and has one child. She is also a big star like CeCe.

In "Quit It Up", Cece, Rocky and Tinka had to audition for Shake It Up Chicago again. Rocky did not pass the audition though and she later watched Shake It Up Chicago on TV with her dad. However, in "Forward & Back It Up", she was back on the show.

=== Flynn Jones ===
Flynn Jones, portrayed by Davis Cleveland, is CeCe's younger brother. Described as "wise beyond his years", his characteristics include having an appetite for bacon, playing video games and annoying his older sister. He feels a special affection for Rocky which is revealed in "Model It Up". His best friend is CeCe's math tutor, a college graduate named Henry Dillon, who is about Flynn's age. He and CeCe's parents are divorced. Their dad is mentioned only once and appeared in the episode "Parent Trap It Up". He is occasionally seen dancing on the show and even performed a routine with Ty and Deuce in "Hot Mess It Up". He will also do anything for ice cream as seen in "Break It Up".

In "Future It Up", it is revealed that in the future, Flynn owns a multinational video game company (Flynndustries) and made Ty his vice president, but is a mean boss and has Ty working 24/7. His nephew, LJ also looks and acts just like him.

=== Ty Blue ===
Ty Blue, portrayed by Roshon Fegan, is Rocky's older brother who is an aspiring actor and rapper and host of Shake It Up Chicago. Although a skilled dancer, he passed on the chance to try out for "Shake It Up Chicago", claiming he does not dance for "the man". His personality is described as "hip, cool and sarcastic", and proclaims himself a ladies' man. He and Deuce are often seen together, but have an odd friendship with each other most of the time. He and Deuce also are often babysitting Flynn. A possible romance-based relationship was developed in episode "Add It Up" between him and Tinka, but was not further progressed in any following episodes. He is good at pranks, like when he doodled on Flynn's face in "Give it Up". He is also the new host on Shake It Up Chicago, after the previous host was fired after arguing with the new executive producer about which Blue (Rocky or Ty) would make the new cast.

In "Future It Up", it is revealed that in the future, Ty became Vice President for a multinational video game company owned by Flynn. Flynn forces him to work 24/7 which causes him not to have a love or social life. He also loses the majority of his hair and gains a lot of weight due to the stress.

=== Deuce Martinez ===
Martin "Deuce" Martinez portrayed by Adam Irigoyen, is CeCe and Rocky's friend. He is said to have an inside-track to almost everything. Deuce is best friends with Ty and is Dina's boyfriend. He often babysits Flynn with Ty's help. He and Ty are almost always seen together. In "Break It Up", it is revealed that Deuce faints at the sight of blood after Rocky shows him how her foot is badly cut. He is of Cuban descent. Despite the fact that he performed a routine with Ty and Flynn in "Hot Mess It Up", it is hinted several times that Deuce does not dance. It is often remarked (mostly by Ty) that, even though he is in a current relationship with Dina, Deuce is unattractive to most women. It is shown in "Party It Up" that he is very easily tricked. He also has an identical cousin named Harrison.

In "Future It Up", it is revealed that in the future, Deuce and Dina get married and have 7 boys. He is the owner of Crusty's, lives in Rocky's old apartment and has a mustache. At the end of the episode, Dina gives birth to their 8th child, which is a girl, the first in the family.

=== Gunther Hessenheffer ===
Gunther Hessenheffer, (Seasons 1-2) portrayed by Kenton Duty, is the flamboyant twin brother of Tinka (portrayed by Caroline Sunshine) who came to Chicago as exchange students from a small mountain country in the first grade. Their parents are in only one episode ("Vatallihootsit It Up") but they are even stranger than the twins. He and his sister are "frenemies" to CeCe and Rocky. Gunther owns numerous betwinklers. The siblings wear bright, sparkly-accented clothing, that, along with their distinct accents, are commonplace to his homeland. It is said that Gunther models sweaters. Gunther is closest to his sister, Tinka, but shares an on-off friendship with Ty. In "Shrink It Up", it is revealed that in a flashback, he and Tinka were in the same ballet class as CeCe and Rocky, and it is also shown that the two pairs were still frenemies at a young age. In season two, he appeared sporadically as he was absent for thirteen episodes. He leaves the show at the end of season two.

=== Tinka Hessenheffer ===
Tinka Hessenheffer, (Recurring season 1, Main seasons 2-3), portrayed by Caroline Sunshine, is the twin sister of Gunther (portrayed by Kenton Duty) who came to Chicago as exchange students from a small mountainous country in Eastern Europe in the first grade. They eat strange food and give out leftovers in small doggy bags. The parents of Tinka and Gunther are only in one episode, but they are even stranger than the twins. She and her brother are "frenemies" to Rocky and CeCe at school and as fellow dancers on Shake It Up Chicago. She goes on a date with Ty Blue in one episode. They are shown to have feelings for each other after the date is over, but further progress was not shown in the succeeding episodes. Tinka takes pride in herself, similar to Gunther, and is competitive. In the season three premiere, Tinka surprises Rocky and CeCe by suddenly acting nice to them. She reveals that Gunther has left to return home and she feels lost without him so wants them as friends. At first wary, Rocky and CeCe decide to give Tinka a chance after she tries to take the blame for burning down the dance studio. She is also known to be a talented cake decorator as shown in "Oh Brother It Up".

In "Future It Up", it is revealed that in the future, Tinka becomes a famous fashion designer (Tinkaware)

== Recurring characters ==
Character	Actor	Season		
Character	Actor	1	2	3
Gary Wilde	R. Brandon Johnson	Recurring	Recurring	Recurring
Georgia Jones	Anita Barone	Recurring	Recurring	Recurring
Marcie Blue	Carla Renata	Recurring	Recurring	Recurring
Dina Garcia	Ainsley Bailey	Recurring	Recurring	Recurring
Henry Dillon	Buddy Handleson	Recurring	Recurring	
Curtis Blue	Phil Morris		Recurring	Recurring
Uncle Frank	Jim Pirri		Recurring	
Logan Hunter	Leo Howard			Recurring
Jeremy Hunter	Anthony Starke			Recurring

=== Gary Wilde ===
Gary Wilde, portrayed by R. Brandon Johnson, is the original host and the current executive producer of Shake It Up, Chicago. He is attracted to photo shoots, drives a red Porsche, and is in his late 30s. He has sent party invites to Oprah Winfrey, but has been turned down seven times, and has been arrested many more. He also likes to take majority of the credit on the show. Whenever he needs something done, he asks CeCe and Rocky to do it for him, but almost never returns the favor. However, he loves Rocky and CeCe like they're his own daughters, as they are two of his best dancers on the show. He gives them a sincere, heart-filled apology in "Shake it Up: Made in Japan" when he's forced to disband them from the show if he wants to continue doing the "Shake it Up" video game project, however, they are soon allowed to return. Later in the show, it is discovered that he burned down Shake It Up Chicago, due to leaving a tanning bed running. He is fired from Shake It Up Chicago for this, and Ty ultimately replaces him as the host. In the episode "Ty It Up", CeCe tells that she, Tinka and Rocky are friends with Gary, and Phil says that Gary tried to get his job back, but didn't get it. In Loyal It Up, Gary returned to announce he is the host of a new dance show "Dance Factor" and tried to get CeCe, Rocky, and Tinka to join the show. Phil later became the producer of Dance Factor and fired Gary, while he took Phil's place as executive producer of Shake It Up, Chicago. He is also the new co-host on Shake It Up, Chicago and now works alongside Ty.

=== Georgia Jones ===
Georgia Jones, portrayed by Anita Barone, is CeCe and Flynn's mother who is a police officer. She is from CeCe and Flynn's father J. J., who Flynn states that he is always working. She claims to be 29 years old but, in reality, she is in her early 40s. She also claims to make mistakes, such as working too much, not being very good at cooking, being backed up on laundry, and always getting into fights (for example, she got into an argument with Rocky's mother). In the she and J. J. become engaged. In "I Do It Up", she and J. J. break of the wedding when Flynn admits that Georgia kissed JJ, her husband and J. J admits he had second thoughts about her. In "Future It Up", in the future, she gets a after CeCe marries J. J.

=== Marcie Blue ===
Marcie Blue, portrayed by Carla Renata, is Rocky and Ty's mother who owns two hair salons. She is an excellent cook, and once mentioned that her husband can never be mad when he is eating some of her pie.

=== Dr. Curtis Blue ===
Dr. Curtis Blue, portrayed by Phil Morris, is Rocky and Ty's father who is a doctor. In season 1 he was away on business overseas. He is first seen in season 2 Doctor It Up. He wanted Ty and Rocky to become doctors when they grew up. He was furious when he found out Ty wanted to be a rapper and that Rocky was dancing on "Shake It Up Chicago" and that she wanted to be a dancer. He finally decided he was okay with both their choices. He is seen again in Apply It Up.

=== Henry Dillon ===
Henry Dillon, portrayed by Buddy Handleson, is Flynn's good friend, although they couldn't be more different. He is a college graduate, pre-law and pre-med, though he is about Flynn's age, and it is usually up to him to teach Henry how to act like a kid. In his first appearance, he was CeCe's math tutor and later became Flynn's friend. He leaves the show at the end of season two.

=== Dina Garcia ===
Dina Maria Carol Louisa Schwartz-Garcia, portrayed by Ainsley Bailey, is Deuce's street-smart girlfriend. She is immensely rich and is shown to be like a female Deuce. She speaks with a strong Brooklyn accent. As shown in Match It Up her dad owns the local mall. She does not happen to care if she is rich or not, she just wants to be like any normal person, like when her birthday was coming up (Twist it Up) she did not want a big party, all she wanted was a regular party with her and her friends. She happens to be her dad's only daughter, who he is overprotective of. It is revealed in "Jingle it Up" that her middle name is Carol. It is mentioned they have been dating a year in the episode "Review It Up". In "Future It Up", in the future, Dina marries Deuce and has 7 boys. She and Deuce also live in Rocky's old apartment. At the end of the episode, she gives birth to their 8th kid, which is a girl, the first in the family.

=== Uncle Frank ===
Uncle Frank, portrayed by Jim Pirri, is Deuce's uncle. He owns "Crusty's Pizza", which is a new setting on Shake It Up. Unlike all the other recurring characters, he first appears in season 2. He enjoys tormenting Deuce with the help from Flynn and Ty. He always insults Deuce in a fun way, but Deuce sometimes takes it seriously. In "Shake It Up, Up and Away" Uncle Frank revealed that he only hired Deuce at "Crusty's" because he is scared of Deuce's mom.

=== Jeremy Jones Hunter ===
Jeremy Hunter, portrayed by [Anthony Starke], is a firefighter and Georgia Jones's fiancé. He and Mrs. Jones get engaged in the episode "Oh Brother It Up." He has a son named Logan Jones (Leo Howard) in which he calls him Lil' Scooter. Jeremy and Georgia break at the altar when Jeremy decides that their relationship was moving too fast, and Georgia kissed her husband the night before. In "Future It Up", he gets a grandson named L.J. when his son marries Georgia's daughter, CeCe.

== Minor characters/Guest Stars ==
- Mrs. Loccasio, portrayed by Renée Taylor, is a cranky elderly lady who takes a disliking to Rocky. She was once a Vegas showgirl; she said she danced in her "birthday suit". She also calls Deuce, "Teen Wolf". Appeared in Give It Up, Model It Up, and Home Alone It Up. In "Give It Up", Rocky tries to get her to like her by having her and CeCe compete in the marathon to raise money for her retirement home. In the end, CeCe and Rocky win the marathon but Mrs. Loccasio still doesn't like Rocky. In "Model It Up", she gets Flynn, Ty, and Deuce to do chores for her so they can make some money for a new video game system. She ends up giving them only $5 after an hour of chores. In "Home Alone It Up", her dog, Mrs. Doglavitz has puppies.
- Mrs. Garcia, portrayed by Maggie Wheeler, is Dina's mother. She always tries to throw an extravagant, over-the-top party for her daughter, but Dina just wants a regular birthday party. (Appeared in Twist It Up and In the bag it up)
- Don Rio Garcia, portrayed by John D'Aquino, is Dina's father, who Deuce is mortally afraid of because of his Mafia like mannerisms. He gave Deuce the responsibility of keeping their pig Pinky, to see if he was the right boyfriend for his daughter. Deuce passed the challenge, and Don Rio Garcia now approves of Deuce. (Appeared in Glitz It Up)
- Larry Diller, portrayed by Larry Miller, is a lawyer who came to join CeCe and Rocky's dance camp because he thinks he is a "fairer". He warned the girls that he will sue them if they refuse to teach him how to dance.
- Suzie, portrayed by Ashley Boettcher, a girl who comes to Rocky and CeCe's dance camp. Flynn seem to have a crush on her.
- Dr. Pepper, portrayed by Harriet Sansom Harris, a cranky therapist that CeCe and Rocky went to in one episode. It is mentioned that she gets cranky when the drive-thru runs out of sweet and sour sauce and it is mentioned also revealed that none of the girls at school would double Dutch with her and has a crush on Fred Flintstone. She could have possibly been the wrong therapist CeCe and Rocky were sent to because at the end of the episode Gary said his therapist's name was Dr. Noveck.
- Kat, portrayed by Kerris Dorsey, is a girl who elaborates a plan to get on Shake It Up Chicago by befriending Cece Jones. Kat pressures them to tell Gary to hire her as an intern on the show. Kat is successful in getting on the show but at the end of the episode, she moves to New York City to join Shake It Up, New York, although the email she had received was a fake email sent by CeCe. (Appeared in Copy Kat It Up)
- Ms. Burke, portrayed by Tyra Banks, the school librarian at John Hugens High School, she is obsessed with romance and has a huge crush on Mr. Zigfield. (Appeared in Parent Trap it Up and My Fair Librarian it Up)
- Mr. Zigfield, portrayed by Alfonso Ribeiro, a schoolteacher at John Hugens High School. (Appeared in My Fair Librarian it Up)
- Eileen, portrayed by Caitlin Carmichael, a tomboy pageant queen whose mother forced her to be in the little cutie queen pageant. She is played by Caitlin Carmichael and appeared in the episode "Glitz it Up!". She and Rocky seem to be friends since they both do not like beauty pageants.
- Vice Principal Winslow, portrayed by Cat Deeley, the Vice- Principal of CeCe, Rocky, Ty, Deuce, Gunther, Tinka, and Dina's school seen in Wild it Up, and to be in later episodes, she was also mentioned in Parent Trap it Up. She is secretly either a singer, dancer or dance show host.
- Danika, portrayed by Carlson Young, a model who competes in the miniature golf contest to raise money for charities. She makes fun of CeCe & Rocky after watching them after they embarrass themselves on camera during taping "Shake It Up: Chicago on camera.
- JJ Jones, portrayed by Matthew Glave, is CeCe and Flynn's father seen in Parent Trap It Up. He has a girlfriend in Florida and intends to propose to her until she dumped him for a guy on the street (which is mentioned in " I do it up").
- Harrison, portrayed by Adam Irigoyen, is Deuce's identical cousin. He is from Boston and appeared in Surprise it Up. It is hinted he may have feelings for Rocky.
- Mr. Watanabe, portrayed by Keone Young, is the boss of Watanabe Studios and he is shown to take his job serious, after Rocky told him that he is wrong, he told Gary to fire CeCe and Rocky and he fired Keiko. In the end, he rehired Keiko as assistant.
- Keiko Ishizuka, portrayed by Ally Maki, is Mr. Watanabe's assistant who came up with the idea of the Shake It Up video game however, when Rocky made Mr. Watanabe feel like he was wrong, Mr. Watanabe fired Keiko and canceled the video game. CeCe and Rocky told Mr. Watanabe to rehire Keiko and she was rehired. She helped Rocky and CeCe so they could perform Made in Japan
- Genta and Tomoka, portrayed by Christopher Naoki Lee and Anna Akana, are the thieves who stole Gunther and Tinka's clothes. When Gunther saw them, he and Tinka were angry to find and when Tinka hit the guard and got arrested. It is unknown if they got away with stealing their clothes.
- Phil, portrayed by Jonathan Chase, was the executive producer of Shake It Up, Chicago from "Quit It Up" to "Loyal It Up". He worked alongside Ty, who replaced Lance Daniels. He left in Loyal It Up to become the executive producer of Dance Factor and was replaced by Gary Wilde.
- Monroe, portrayed by Noah Centineo. He appears on the end of the episode Psych it Up as the dog owner of the lost dog CeCe had and also went on a date with her. It was never revealed if they broke up.
- George Martinez, portrayed by George Lopez, is Deuce's father and the owner of Martinez Plumbing who enjoys bowling. His dream is that every time someone sits on one of his toilets, they think the word "Martinez". His company slogan is "King of Toilets."
- L.J Hunter, portrayed by Davis Cleveland, is CeCe and Logan's son. He appears in the episode Future it Up. He looks identical to his uncle Flynn (CeCe's Brother) and has the same phrase as him "I got it mom!" his full name is Logan Hunter Jr.
