= Canned Laughter =

Canned Laughter may refer to:

- Canned laughter, or laugh track, a separate soundtrack for a recorded comedy show containing the sound of audience laughter
- Canned Laughter, a comedy album by The Bob & Tom Show
- Canned Laughter (TV programme), a 1979 British one-off comedy television programme featuring Rowan Atkinson that aired on ITV
