= List of The Naked Truth episodes =

The following is a list of episodes for the television sitcom The Naked Truth, which ran for three seasons - the first on ABC and the last two on NBC.

== Series overview ==
Season	Episodes	Originally released			Rank	Rating
Season	Episodes	First released	Last released	Network	Rank	Rating
1	20	September 13, 1995	February 28, 1996	ABC	24	11.4
2	13	January 16, 1997	May 14, 1997	NBC	4	16.8
3	22 (Note: Episodes 16–22 never aired.)	September 22, 1997	May 25, 1998	NBC	—N/a	—N/a

== Episodes ==
=== Season 1 (1995–96) ===
No. overall	No. in season	Title	Directed by	Written by	Original release date	Prod. code	Viewers (millions)
1	1	"The Naked Truth"	Michael Lessac	Chris Thompson	September 13, 1995	100	18.0
2	2	"Bald Star in Hot Oil Fest!"	Michael Lessac	Rob Edwards	September 20, 1995	102	20.8
3	3	"Elvis Is Coming!"	Ted Bessell	Laurie Parres	September 27, 1995	103	17.0
4	4	"Woman Jokes While Husband Croaks!"	Alan Myerson	Chris Thompson	October 11, 1995	101	17.1
5	5	"Sex-Crazed Sitcom Zombie Gropes Shutterbug (In Midnight Morgue Orgy)!"	Arlene Sanford	Gary Janetti	October 25, 1995	105	16.7
6	6	"Hero Pig Goes Hog Wild!"	Arlene Sanford	Bruce Eric Kaplan	November 1, 1995	106	17.2
7	7	"Real Life Henry Higgins Turns Dork Into Duke!"	Art Dielhenn	Kevin Rooney	November 8, 1995	107	17.4
8	8	"Star and Comet Collide! Giant Bugs Invade!!"	Peter Bonerz	Jeffrey Klarik	November 15, 1995	104	15.7
9	9	"Girl Buys Soup While Woman Weds Ape!"	Art Dielhenn	Chris Thompson	November 22, 1995	108	16.2
10	10	"Woman Weds Siamese Twins!"	Dennis Erdman	Chris Thompson	November 29, 1995	110	15.9
11	11	"Comet Nails Star and Vice Versa!"	Dennis Erdman	Chris Thompson	December 13, 1995	111	15.1
12	12	"Sewer Gators, Swordplay, Santa from Hell!"	Peter Bonerz	Paul Liberstein	December 20, 1995	109	15.0
13	13	"Shocking Tales of Hollywood Gunplay!"	Pamela Fryman	Laurie Parres & Paul Liberstein	January 3, 1996	112	15.8
14	14	"Woman Loses Space Alien, Finds God!"	Rob Schiller	Story by : Chris Thompson; Teleplay by : Mark Wilding & Gary Janetti	January 10, 1996	113	15.9
15	15	"Man Wakes Up with Stranger in Pants!"	Peter Bonerz	Drake Sather	January 17, 1996	114	15.4
16	16	"The Bubble Show"	Peter Bonerz	Jon Vitti	January 31, 1996	115	15.7
17	17	"Women Rises in World, Falls on Face!"	Leonard R. Garner Jr.	Chris Thompson	February 7, 1996	116	14.4
18	18	"Sisters in Sex Triangle with Gazillionaire!"	Shelley Jensen	Gary Janetti	February 14, 1996	117	16.0
19	19	"Man Loses Load While Woman Can't Dump!"	Michael Lembeck	Paul Lieberstein	February 21, 1996	118	16.0
20	20	"Hollywood Honors Male Prostitute!"	Michael Lessac	Mark Wilding	February 28, 1996	119	14.7

=== Season 2 (1997) ===
No. overall	No. in season	Title	Directed by	Written by	Original release date	Prod. code	Viewers (millions)
21	1	"We're at NBC Now"	Gail Mancuso	Maya Forbes	January 16, 1997	201	29.87
22	2	"Woman Gets Plastered, Star Gets Even"	Gail Mancuso	Ed Yeager & Philip Vaughn	January 23, 1997	202	25.91
23	3	"Itching for a Cat"	Arlene Sanford	Jenny Bicks	January 30, 1997	204	25.71
24	4	"The Sister Show"	Arlene Sanford	Miriam Trogdon	February 6, 1997	205	25.18
25	5	"A Year in the Life"	Arlene Sanford	Marsh McCall & Tom Martin	February 13, 1997	206	26.92
26	6	"The Dating Game"	Matthew Diamond	Robert Cohen & Leslie Caveny	February 20, 1997	207	26.72
27	7	"Comet Lands in Man's Garage"	Arlene Sanford	Scott Bank	February 27, 1997	203	21.62
28	8	"The Scoop"	Robby Benson	Story by : Miriam Trogdon & Marsh McCall; Teleplay by : Jenny Bicks & Tom Martin	March 13, 1997	208	24.24
29	9	"The Birds"	Robby Benson	Carol Leifer	March 20, 1997	209	19.88
30	10	"The Debt"	Rob Schiller	Tom Martin & Philip Vaughn	March 27, 1997	210	20.90
31	11	"The Parents: Part 1"	Pamela Fryman	Ed Yeager	April 3, 1997	211	20.63
32	12	"The Spa: Part 2"	Pamela Fryman	Story by : Marsh McCall; Teleplay by : Jenny Bicks & Tom Martin	April 3, 1997	212	22.27
33	13	"The Source"	Matthew Diamond	Story by : Robert Cohen; Teleplay by : Leslie Caveny & Tom Martin	May 14, 1997	213	6.97

=== Season 3 (1997–98) ===
No. overall	No. in season	Title	Directed by	Written by	Original release date	Prod. code	Viewers (millions)
34	1	"Things Change"	Robby Benson	Michael Saltzman	September 22, 1997	301	13.78
35	2	"Her Girl Friday"	Robby Benson	Allan Heinberg	September 29, 1997	302	11.17
36	3	"Bully for Dave"	Robby Benson	Jon Sherman	October 6, 1997	304	11.21
37	4	"Liesl Weapon"	Robby Benson	Tom Palmer	October 13, 1997	303	12.24
38	5	"Bridesface Revisited"	Robby Benson	Ken Keeler	October 20, 1997	305	13.30
39	6	"We Almost Had Paris"	Matthew Diamond	Tom Martin	November 10, 1997	307	10.14
40	7	"Look at Me! Look at Me!"	Robby Benson	Jim Vallely & Kevin Dornan	November 17, 1997	306	11.19
41	8	"Going Mein Way"	Matthew Diamond	Rachel Sweet	November 24, 1997	309	10.05
42	9	"He Ain't Famous, He's My Brother"	Matthew Diamond	Matthew Weiner	December 8, 1997	308	10.21
43	10	"The Unsinkable Nora Wilde"	Matthew Diamond	Tom Palmer	December 15, 1997	311	9.96
44	11	"Hooked on Heroine"	Rob Schiller	Rachel Sweet	January 26, 1998	315	9.35
45	12	"Women on the Verge of a Rhytidectomy"	Robby Benson	Allan Heinberg	February 2, 1998	313	9.91
46	13	"8 1/2"	Robby Benson	Ken Keeler	February 9, 1998	314	9.08
47	14	"The Neighbor of Bath"	Robby Benson	Jon Sherman	March 9, 1998	316	7.57
48	15	"Day of the Locos"	Robby Benson	Matthew Weiner	May 25, 1998	317	6.88
49	16	"Muddy for Nothing"	Robby Benson	Humphrey MacDougal	Unaired	318	N/A
50	17	"Born to Be Wilde"	Robby Benson	Kate Nielsen	Unaired	319	N/A
51	18	"The Seer and the Sucker"	Matthew Diamond	Ken Keeler	Unaired	310	N/A
52	19	"Can't We All Just Get Along?"	Matthew Diamond	Tom Martin	Unaired	312	N/A
53	20	"Bob & Carol & Ted & Alice, Except with Different Names: Part 1"	Rob Schiller	Ken Keeler	Unaired	320	N/A
54	21	"Jake or Fake: Part 2"	Rob Schiller	Rachel Sweet	Unaired	321	N/A
55	22	"Up, Up and Away"	Rob Schiller	Michael Saltzman	Unaired	322	N/A
