= Small & Frye =

American television series

- Genre: Comedy; Sitcom; Detective fiction; Fantasy
- Created by: George Schenck; Ron Friedman
- Written by: Nick Arnold; Ron Friedman; Leonard Ripps; George Schenck
- Starring: Darren McGavin; Jack Blessing; Dick Wilson; Victoria Carroll; Debbie Zipp
- Composer: Dennis McCarthy
- Country of origin: United States
- Original language: English
- No. of seasons: 1
- No. of episodes: 6

Production
- Running time: 30 minutes
- Production company: Walt Disney Productions

Original release
- Network: CBS
- Release: March 7 – June 15, 1983

Small & Frye is an American television sitcom that was produced by The Walt Disney Company and broadcast on CBS in 1983. This series, which starred Darren McGavin and Jack Blessing as the title characters, lasted for only one season of six episodes.

== Synopsis ==
Nick Small (McGavin) and Chip Frye (Blessing) are private investigators. Due to a lab accident, Frye is able to physically shrink to a height of six inches, but he can't control this ability; he could become miniature or normal size at any time. This is sometimes an aid to their investigations, and sometimes an embarrassing hindrance.

== Cast ==
- Darren McGavin as Nick Small
- Jack Blessing as Chip Frye
- Debbie Zipp as Phoebe Small
- Bill Daily as Dr. Hanratty

== US TV ratings ==
| Season | Episodes | Start date | End date | Nielsen rank | Nielsen rating |
|---|---|---|---|---|---|
| 1982–83 | 6 | March 7, 1983 | June 15, 1983 | 76 | N/A |

== Episodes ==
The pilot episode of this series was broadcast as the fourth in order.

| No. | Title | Directed by | Written by | Original release date |
|---|---|---|---|---|
| 1 | "Fiddler on the Hoof" | Leslie H. Martinson | Nick Arnold | March 7, 1983 |
The detectives look for a stolen Stradivarius owned by a violinist who's a friend of Small's daughter.
| 2 | "Endangered Detectives" | Edward H. Feldman | Leonard Ripps | March 14, 1983 |
| 3 | "The Case of the Street of Silence" | James Sheldon | Nick Arnold | March 21, 1983 |
A former girlfriend sets up Small to kill the man she claims is out to kill her — her husband.
| 4 | "Pilot" | Charles S. Dubin | Story by : George Schenck & Ron Friedman; Teleplay by : Ron Friedman | June 1, 1983 |
A wounded old sailor begs the detectives to find his long-lost daughter before the thugs who shot him do.
| 5 | "Schlockty Too" | John Bowab | Nick Arnold | June 8, 1983 |
A boxing manager asks Small to protect his heavyweight contender until he can pay off a loan shark.
| 6 | "The Case of the Concerned Husband" | Mel Ferber | Nick Arnold | June 15, 1983 |
Small's brother-in-law is being blackmailed by a gang that took photos of him and a woman that would make his wife see red.
