= Jack Blessing =

American actor

- Born: July 29, 1951; Baltimore, Maryland, U.S.
- Died: November 14, 2017 (aged 66); Chatsworth, California, U.S.
- Education: Calvert Hall High School, Frostburg State University
- Occupation: Actor
- Years active: 1977–2017
- Spouse: Lora Blessing
- Children: 2

Jack Blessing (July 29, 1951 – November 14, 2017) was an American film and television actor. He was notable for his roles as MacGillicuddy on Moonlighting and as Jack Powers in the sitcom George Lopez. He also had a recurring role as Mr. Donner in the television series The Naked Truth.

== Early life ==
Blessing was born and raised in Baltimore, Maryland. He graduated from Calvert Hall High School in 1969, and from Frostburg State University, before serving in the United States Army from 1972 to 1975. At Frostburg, Blessing played the male lead in a fall 1969 college production of Romeo and Juliet. In the Army, he was assigned to the Defense Language Institute in Monterey, California, and to Augsburg, Germany. He later moved to Boston, Massachusetts to begin his acting career. He began his professional career as a member of Boston's seminal improvisational company The Proposition.

== Career ==
In his last year at The Proposition, Blessing was discovered by a Paramount casting director. Afterwards, he had a role in the Emmy Award-winning television film The Defection of Simas Kudirka (1978).

Blessing would soon guest star in The X-Files, Judging Amy, NYPD Blue, Murder One, Home Improvement, and in Everybody Loves Raymond. Blessing had a role in the Will Ferrell comedy Talladega Nights: The Ballad of Ricky Bobby as Jarvis.

Blessing gained national prominence on the hit series Moonlighting in 1986. Later, he recurred as Jack Powers in George Lopez, playing the character in 25 episodes spanning from 2002 through the series' finale in 2007.

In the years following George Lopez, Blessing appeared in smaller roles in Shrek the Third, Megamind, ParaNorman and in Legends of Oz: Dorothy's Return.

== Death ==
Blessing died of pancreatic cancer at his home in Chatsworth, California on November 14, 2017, at the age of 66. He is survived by two sons and his wife.

== Filmography ==
=== Film ===
Year	Title	Role	Notes
1980	Heaven's Gate	Emigrant Boy	
1981	Galaxy of Terror	Cos	
1986	Hamburger: The Motion Picture	Nacio Herb Zipser	
1986	Children of a Lesser God	Announcer (voice)	
1987	Summer School	Student	
1989	Uncle Buck	Additional Voices (voice)	
1990	The Spirit of '76	Voice Talent (voice)	
1991	Samantha	Herman Hathaway	
1991	An American Tail: Fievel Goes West	Various (voice)	Uncredited
1994	The New Age	(voice)	
1995	A Goofy Movie	Various (voice)	Uncredited
2000	Ground Zero	Sportscaster	
2000	Above Suspicion	Nick	
2000	Thirteen Days	John Scali	
2006	Talladega Nights: The Ballad of Ricky Bobby	Jarvis	
2006	Open Season	(voice)	
2010	Megamind	Newscaster (voice)	
2012	ParaNorman	Slob Guy/Civil War Ghost (voice)	
2013	Legends of Oz: Dorothy's Return	Additional Voices (voice)	
2017	Shock and Awe	Man on Phone (voice)	
2019	Missing Link	McVitie/Conductor (voice)	(Posthumous Release) (final film role)

=== Television ===
Year	Title	Role	Notes
1978	The Defection of Simas Kudirka	Kabek	TV movie
1979	Women at West Point	Tom Fenton	TV movie
1980	Goodtime Girls		Uncredited
1981	Miracle on Ice	Mark Pavelich	TV movie
1981	Quincy M.E.	Alex Grauman	2 episodes
1981	M*A*S*H	Lt. Rollins	Episode: "Snappier Judgement"
1983	Small & Frye	Chip Frye	6 episodes
1983	Remington Steele	George Plummer	Episodes: "Steele Away with Me", parts 1 and 2
1985	Amos	Scott Lasher	TV movie
1985	Family Ties	Leonard	Episodes: "Cold Storage", "Oh, Donna"
1985	George Burns Comedy Week		Episode: "Disaster at Buzz Creek"
1987	Stingray		Episode: "Playback"
1987	Mr. President	Brian	Episodes: "The Magnetic Presidency", "Love Labor's Last"
1987	CBS Summer Playhouse	Jerry	Episode: "In the Lion's Den"
1987	Thirtysomething	Jeff Hagis	Episode: "We Gather Together"
1988	Amen	Lawrence Osborne	Episode: "Get 'Em Up, Scout"
1988–1989	Day by Day	Kevin Farrell	Episodes: "How to Succeed in Day Care", "Out for a Stretch"
1989	China Beach	Sgt. Masters	Episode: "Afterburner"
1986–1989	Moonlighting	MacGillicudy	17 episodes
1989	Mancuso, FBI	Barry Swenson	Episode: "Conflict of Interest"
1989	Living Dolls	Gibson	Episode: "The Not So Sweet Smell of Success"
1990	Empty Nest	Evan Phillips	Episode: "Complainin' in the Rain"
1990	Babes	Crellin	Episode: "Marlene's Problem"
1991	The Golden Girls	Father Monroe	Episode: "There Goes the Bride pt. 2"
1991	Roseanne	Cyrano/Phil	Episode: "Communicable Theater"
1992	The Last of His Tribe	Tom Waterman	
1992	Civil Wars	Mark Hayes	Episode: "Till Debt Do Us Part"
1992	Dream On	Dr. Raines	Episode: "For Richard or for Poorer"
1994	SeaQuest 2032	Gaye	Episode: "The Stinger"
1994	The Larry Sanders Show	Dennis Markle	Episode: "The Mr. Sharon Stone Show"
1994	Diagnosis Murder	Special Agt. Matthew Dickerson	Episode: "The Last Laugh Pt. 2"
1995	Cybill	Stan	Episode: "How Can I Call You My Ex-Husbands If You Won't Go Away?"
1995	Northern Exposure	Professor Aaron Martin	Episode: "The Graduate"
1995	Life with Louie		Episode: "A Fish Called Pepper"
1995–1996	The Naked Truth	Mr. Donner	20 episodes
1996	Star Trek: Deep Space Nine	Dulmur	Episode: "Trials and Tribble-ations"
1996	Dangerous Minds	Mr. Overton	Episodes: "Family Ties", "Evolution"
1997	Murder One: Diary of a Serial Killer	Detective Seybolt	6 episodes
1997	Everybody Loves Raymond	Dr. Hammond	Episode: "Debra's Sick"
1997	ER	Roger Drummond	Episode: "Post Modem"
1996–1997	Murder One	Detective Seybolt	4 episodes
1997	Home Improvement	Dr. Breen	Episode: "Room at the Top"
1997	Cracker: Mind Over Murder	Detective Bobby Leary	Episode: "'Tis Pity She's a Whore"
1997	C-16: FBI		Episode: "Orange Kid"
1997	Smart Guy	Mr. Delk	Episode: "Book Smart"
1997	The Practice	D.A. Horowitz	Episode: "Hide and Seek"
1997	Profiler	Burton	Episodes: "It Cuts Both Ways", "Old Acquaintance"
1997–1998	Brooklyn South	Officer Anthony Fiano	Episodes: "Love Hurts", "Gay Avec"
1998	Maximum Bob	Agent Neff	Episode: "Bay of Big's"
1998	NYPD Blue	Dr. Swan	2 episodes
1999	Touched by an Angel	Howard Heller	Episode: "My Brother's Keeper"
1999	It's Like, You Know...	Mr. Lynch	2 episodes
2000–2001	Any Day Now	Mr. Schillings	2 episodes
2000–2002	Judging Amy	Russell Lynchburg	2 episodes
2000	City of Angels	Deputy Chief Shaw	Episode: "SWAT's Happening"
2001	That's Life	Leo Kelley	Episode: "Bad Chemistry"
2002	The X-Files	Dr. Jack Preijers	Episode: "Audrey Pauley"
2002–2007	George Lopez	Jack Powers	20 episodes
2009	The Closer	Dr. Dennis Blair	Episode: "Walking Back the Cat"
2009	CSI: Crime Scene Investigation	Officer Danny Finn	Episode: "Coupe de Grace"
2012	Mike & Molly	Pilot	Episode: "The Honeymoon Is Over"

=== Video games ===
Year	Title	Role	Notes
2007	Shrek the Third	Additional Voices (voice)	Uncredited
