= List of Shake It Up episodes =

This is a list of episodes for the Disney Channel original series Shake It Up, which premiered on November 7, 2010 and ended on November 10, 2013. The series follows two best friends, CeCe Jones and Rocky Blue (portrayed by Bella Thorne and Zendaya respectively), who land their dream job as back-up dancers on the television show, Shake It Up, Chicago. The show follows their adventures in the show and features problems and issues such as their new social status, tests their friendships and rivals on the show. The show's third season premiered on October 14, 2012. In July 2013, Disney Channel announced that Shake It Up would end after its third season.

== Series overview ==
Season	Episodes	Originally released	
Season	Episodes	First released	Last released
1	21	November 7, 2010	August 21, 2011
2	28	September 18, 2011	August 17, 2012
3	26	October 14, 2012	November 10, 2013

== Episodes ==
=== Season 1 (2010–11) ===
No. overall	No. in season	Title	Directed by	Written by	Original release date	Prod. code	US viewers (millions)
1	1	"Start It Up"	Shelley Jensen	Chris Thompson	November 7, 2010	101	6.20
2	2	"Meatball It Up"	Shelley Jensen	John D. Beck & Ron Hart	November 14, 2010	104	4.09
3	3	"Give It Up"	Shelley Jensen	Rob Lotterstein	November 21, 2010	103	4.28
4	4	"Add It Up"	Shelley Jensen	Eileen Conn	November 28, 2010	105	3.80
5	5	"Kick It Up"	Shelley Jensen	Ron Zimmerman	December 5, 2010	107	4.26
6	6	"Age It Up"	Shelley Jensen	Rob Lotterstein	December 9, 2010	108	N/A
7	7	"Party It Up"	Shelley Jensen	Jenny Lee	December 12, 2010	106	3.70
8	8	"Hook It Up"	Shelley Jensen	Chris Thompson	December 19, 2010	102	N/A
9	9	"Wild It Up"	Joel Zwick	Chris Thompson	January 9, 2011	110	4.07
10	10	"Match It Up"	Joel Zwick	Rob Lotterstein	January 23, 2011	111	4.31
11	11	"Show It Up"	Joel Zwick	Eileen Conn	February 20, 2011	112	3.96
12	12	"Heat It Up"	Katy Garretson	John D. Beck & Ron Hart	February 27, 2011	109	3.73
13	13	"Glitz It Up"	Eric Dean Seaton	Ron Zimmerman	March 6, 2011	113	3.82
14	14	"Hot Mess It Up"	Eric Dean Seaton	John D. Beck & Ron Hart	March 20, 2011	114	3.64
15	15	"Reunion It Up"	Sean McNamara	Howard J. Morris	April 10, 2011	116	3.67
16	16	"Sweat It Up"	Joel Zwick	David Tolentino	May 1, 2011	117	3.11
17	17	"Vatalihootsit It Up"	Joel Zwick	John D. Beck & Ron Hart	June 12, 2011	118	3.27
18	18	"Model It Up"	Eric Dean Seaton	Jenny Lee	June 17, 2011	115	4.11
19	19	"Twist It Up"	Shelley Jensen	Eileen Conn	July 10, 2011	119	3.69
20	20	"Break It Up"	Shelley Jensen	Teleplay by : Jenny Lee; Story by : Chris Thompson	July 24, 2011	121	4.06
21	21	"Throw It Up"	Shelley Jensen	Rob Lotterstein	August 21, 2011	120	3.43

=== Season 2 (2011–12) ===
No. overall	No. in season	Title	Directed by	Written by	Original release date	Prod. code	US viewers (millions)
22	1	"Shrink It Up"	Joel Zwick	Rob Lotterstein	September 18, 2011	203	3.62
23	2	"Three's a Crowd It Up"	Joel Zwick	Jenny Lee	September 25, 2011	206	2.94
24	3	"Shake It Up, Up & Away"	Joel Zwick	Rob Lotterstein (Part 1); Eileen Conn (Part 2)	October 2, 2011	201–202	3.81
25	4	"Beam It Up"	Joel Zwick	David Holden	October 9, 2011	204	4.46
26	5	"Doctor It Up"	Joel Zwick	Jeff Strauss	October 23, 2011	205	3.52
27	6	"Review It Up"	Joel Zwick	David Holden	November 6, 2011	210	3.94
28	7	"Double Pegasus It Up"	Joel Zwick	David Tolentino	November 13, 2011	207	3.24
29	8	"Auction It Up"	Joel Zwick	David Tolentino	November 20, 2011	211	3.63
30	9	"Camp It Up"	Joel Zwick	Eileen Conn	November 27, 2011	213	3.89
31	10	"Jingle It Up"	Ellen Gittelsohn	Eileen Conn	December 11, 2011	212	3.48
32	11	"Apply It Up"	Joel Zwick	David Holden	January 8, 2012	215	3.18
33	12	"Split It Up"	Joel Zwick	Jenn Lloyd & Kevin Bonani	January 22, 2012	208	2.80
34	13	"Copy Kat It Up"	Joel Zwick	Rob Lotterstein	February 19, 2012	219	3.46
35	14	"Egg It Up"	Joel Zwick	Jenny Lee	February 26, 2012	209	2.63
36	15	"Judge It Up"	Ellen Gittelsohn	Eileen Conn	March 11, 2012	214	3.25
37	16	"Parent Trap It Up"	Joel Zwick	Jeff Strauss	March 25, 2012	218	2.97
38	17	"Weird It Up"	Alfonso Ribeiro	David Tolentino	April 1, 2012	217	2.51
39	18	"Whodunit Up?"	Joel Zwick	Darin Henry	April 15, 2012	221	3.67
40	19	"Tunnel It Up"	Joel Zwick	Jenny Lee	May 13, 2012	216	3.28
41	20	"Protest It Up"	Joel Zwick	Cat Davis	May 20, 2012	220	3.14
42	21	"Wrestle It Up"	Joel Zwick	Jenn Lloyd & Kevin Bonani	June 3, 2012	222	3.17
43	22	"Reality Check It Up"	Joel Zwick	Jenny Lee	June 10, 2012	226	2.87
44	23	"Rock and Roll It Up"	Roger Christiansen	Jenn Lloyd & Kevin Bonani	July 1, 2012	225	3.74
45	24	"Boot It Up"	Joel Zwick	Jeff Strauss	July 15, 2012	227	3.93
46	25	"Slumber It Up"	Roger Christiansen	Jenny Lee	July 29, 2012	223	3.13
47	26	"Surprise It Up"	Alfonso Ribeiro	David Holden & Jeff Strauss	August 5, 2012	224	2.87
48	27	"Embarrass It Up"	Joel Zwick	Eileen Conn	August 12, 2012	228	3.84
49	28	"Made in Japan"	Joel Zwick	Rob Lotterstein	August 17, 2012	229–231	4.54

=== Season 3 (2012–13) ===
No. overall	No. in season	Title	Directed by	Written by	Original release date	Prod. code	US viewers (millions)
50	1	"Fire It Up"	Joel Zwick	Rob Lotterstein	October 14, 2012	301	3.88
51	2	"Funk It Up"	Joel Zwick	Eileen Conn	October 28, 2012	302	3.15
52	3	"Spirit It Up"	Joel Zwick	Darin Henry	November 4, 2012	303	3.23
53	4	"Lock It Up"	Joel Zwick	Jenny Lee	November 11, 2012	304	3.06
54	5	"Merry Merry It Up"	Joel Zwick	Jennifer Glickman	December 2, 2012	306	3.85
55	6	"Home Alone It Up"	Joel Zwick	Jenn Lloyd & Kevin Bonani	December 9, 2012	305	3.21
56	7	"Oh Brother It Up"	Rosario J. Roveto, Jr.	Rob Lotterstein	January 13, 2013	307	3.27
57	8	"Quit It Up"	Joel Zwick	Jenny Lee	January 27, 2013	308	3.41
58	9	"Ty It Up"	Joel Zwick	Eileen Conn	February 17, 2013	309	4.50
59	10	"My Fair Librarian It Up"	Alfonso Ribeiro	Jennifer Glickman	February 24, 2013	310	3.73
60	11	"Clean It Up"	Joel Zwick	Darin Henry	March 10, 2013	311	3.24
61	12	"I Do It Up"	Joel Zwick	Rob Lotterstein	March 17, 2013	312	4.46
62	13	"Forward and Back It Up"	Joel Zwick	Jennifer Glickman & Darin Henry	March 24, 2013	313	2.74
63	14	"Switch It Up"	Joel Zwick	Cat Davis & Eddie Quintana	April 7, 2013	317	3.27
64	15	"Love and War It Up"	Joel Zwick	Jenny Lee	April 28, 2013	316	3.06
65	16	"In the Bag It Up"	Alfonso Ribeiro	David Tolentino	May 12, 2013	314	2.63
66	17	"Brain It Up"	Alfonso Ribeiro	Jenn Lloyd & Kevin Bonani	June 2, 2013	315	2.95
67	18	"Opposites Attract It Up"	Joel Zwick	Eileen Conn	June 23, 2013	318	3.36
68	19	"Psych It Up"	Rosario J. Roveto, Jr.	Rob Lotterstein	July 14, 2013	319	3.45
69	20	"Future It Up"	Alfonso Ribeiro	Eileen Conn	July 28, 2013	320	3.60
70	21	"Oui Oui It Up"	Alfonso Ribeiro	Jenny Lee	August 4, 2013	323	3.26
71	22	"My Bitter Sweet 16 It Up"	Joel Zwick	Rob Lotterstein	August 25, 2013	325	3.18
72	23	"Stress It Up"	Joel Zwick	Darin Henry	September 15, 2013	322	3.31
73	24	"Loyal It Up"	Joel Zwick	Eileen Conn	September 29, 2013	324	3.04
74	25	"Haunt It Up"	Kimberly McCullough	Alison Taylor	October 6, 2013	321	3.07
75	26	"Remember Me" "Remember It Up"	Joel Zwick	Rob Lotterstein	November 10, 2013	326	3.36
