= Hard Knocks (1987 TV series) =

- Created by: Chris Thompson
- Starring: Bill Maher; Tommy Hinkley
- Composers: Dan Foliart; Howard Pearl
- Country of origin: United States
- Original language: English
- No. of seasons: 1
- No. of episodes: 13

Production
- Executive producers: Gary Nardino; Chris Thompson
- Running time: approx. 30 min.
- Production companies: Gary Nardino-Chris Thompson Productions; Paramount Television

Original release
- Network: Showtime
- Release: April 20 – August 6, 1987

Hard Knocks is an American comedy-drama television series that aired on the Showtime Network. It featured Bill Maher and Tommy Hinkley as ideologically opposed private detectives looking to make money by solving the problems of their wealthy clients.

== Plot ==
Gower Rhodes and Nick Bronco open a private detective agency in the back of a restaurant to make money by solving cases. However, nothing seems to go their way.

== Cast ==
=== Main characters ===
- Bill Maher as Gower Rhodes
- Tommy Hinkley as Nick Bronco

=== Recurring and guest roles ===
- Judith-Marie Bergan as Maggie
- Babette Props as Terry
- James Vallely as Silky
- Gracie Harrison as Sheila Jesswalters

== Episodes ==
No.	Title	Directed by	Written by	Original release date
1	"Pilot"	Jules Lichtman	Chris Thompson	July 23, 1987
2	"Play Mr. Tambourine Man for Me"	Don Barnhart	Rob Dames, Bob Fraser	April 20, 1987
Gower and Nick go on a double date
3	"What Becomes a Legend Least"	Shelley Jensen	Marjorie Gross	May 8, 1987
4	"The End of the World"	Rob Dames	Don Reo	May 15, 1987
Gower and Nick release a deadly chemical
5	"Bronco's Rib"	Shelley Jensen	Ron Zimmerman	May 29, 1987
6	"Fallen Idol"	Jules Lichtman	Don Reo	June 5, 1987
7	"Luck be a Dead Gangster Tonight"	Chris Thompson	Marjorie Gross	June 12, 1987
8	"If You Knew Nancy"	Shelley Jensen	Ron Zimmerman	June 19, 1987
9	"Highway to Hard Knocks"	Shelley Jensen	Unknown	June 26, 1987
10	"The Hits"	Shelley Jensen	Don Reo	July 9, 1987
11	"Captain Justice"	Shelley Jensen	Marjorie Gross, Don Reo, Chris Thompson, Ron Zimmerman	July 16, 1987
12	"Sap Cops"	Shelley Jensen	George Beckerman	July 30, 1987
13	"Hammerhead Is Out"	Shelley Jensen	Unknown	August 6, 1987

== Reception ==
=== Critical reception ===
John J. O'Connor of the New York Times called the show "something truly different." The show has also been reviewed in the Spartanburg Herald-Journal as "hard to watch," and in the Chicago Tribune as having woeful writing, unappealing characters, an infantile premise, and as "making programmers at the three networks look like charter members of Mensa."

=== Awards and nominations ===
Hard Knocks was nominated for a CableACE Award in 1988

== Sources ==
- Hard Knocks (1987) on TV.com
- Hard Knocks- Series Overview on nytimes.com
- TV Review; 'Hard Knocks,' Sitcom on nytimes.com
- US Copyright Office on copyright.gov
