= The Preston Episodes =

American sitcom

- Created by: Jace Richdale
- Starring: David Alan Grier; Judith Scott
- Composer: Bruce Miller
- Country of origin: United States
- Original language: English
- No. of seasons: 1
- No. of episodes: 10 (2 unaired)

Production
- Executive producers: David Alan Grier; Amy Howard; Jace Richdale
- Camera setup: Multi-camera
- Running time: 30 minutes
- Production companies: Red Meat Inc. Jobsite Productions; 20th Century Fox Television

Original release
- Network: Fox
- Release: September 9 – October 28, 1995

The Preston Episodes is an American sitcom that aired from September 9 to October 28, 1995, on Fox.

== Premise ==
A divorced English professor recently moved from New Jersey starts working as a caption writer for a gossip magazine called Stuff in Manhattan.

== Cast ==
- David Alan Grier as David Preston
- Judith Scott as Kelly Freeman
- Tommy Hinkley as Derek Clooney
- Matthew Walker as Adam Green
- Brent Hinkley as Harlow
- Clive Revill as Larry Dunhill

== Episodes ==
No.	Title	Directed by	Written by	Original release date	Prod. code	Viewers (millions)
1	"Pilot"	James Burrows	Jace Richdale	September 9, 1995	3E79	8.4
An English professor tries to get a job as a "serious writer", but ends up with a job at a gossip magazine.
2	"The Adam Gets Promoted Episode"	Matthew Diamond	Jon Sherman	September 16, 1995	3E01	7.0
David is pressured into altering a failing grade that Adam has on his transcript.
3	"The Competition Episode"	Matthew Diamond	David Babcock	September 23, 1995	3E02	5.5
David and Kelly competes about who will write the "Sunside Strangler" story.
4	"David's First Date Episode"	Matthew Diamond	Mike Martineau	September 30, 1995	3E03	7.1
David finds out that Marilyn only wants him for his mind, not his looks. Harlow has to dance with the boss' beefy wife.
5	"The Divorce Ceremony Episode"	Matthew Diamond	Nastaran Dibai, Jeffrey B. Hodes	October 7, 1995	3E04	6.8
David has a "divorce ceremony" in order to forget about his ex-wife.
6	"The Dog Episode"	Matthew Diamond	Jace Richdale	October 14, 1995	3E05	6.8
David gets a dog so he can meet more women, but ends up in a canine custody battle when the dog's former owners want him back.
7	"The Harlow Quits Episode"	Matthew Diamond	Neal Boushell, Sam O'Neal	October 21, 1995	3E06	5.3
Harlow quits his job when he is pushed too far by David, and David ends up filling in for him.
8	"The Halloween Episode"	Matthew Diamond	Mike Scully, Julie Thacker-Scully	October 28, 1995	3E07	4.3
David gets questioned by the FBI.
9	"The Older Woman Episode"	N/A	N/A	Unaired	3E08	N/A
10	"The David and Dunhill Episode"	N/A	N/A	Unaired	3E09	N/A
