= Lyndall Hobbs =

Australian film director and producer (born 1952)

- Born: 1952 (age 73–74); Australia
- Occupations: Director; producer; interior designer
- Years active: 1973–present
- Spouse: Chris Thompson (m. 1986; div. 1989)
- Partner: Al Pacino (1989–1996)
- Children: 2 (Note: One biological child and one adopted child.)

Lyndall Hobbs (born 1952) is an Australian film director and producer.

== Life and career ==
Hobbs was born in Australia in 1952. She spent many years in the United Kingdom, during which time she directed the documentary film Steppin' Out (1979) featuring the UK act Secret Affair, and hosting Hobbs' Choice television show, before moving to Hollywood in the United States.

In 1983, she directed the short film, Dead on Time, starring Rowan Atkinson. In 1987, she directed her first and to date only full-length feature film, Back to the Beach starring Frankie Avalon and Annette Funicello. Hobbs also worked in episodic television, directing episodes of Parker Lewis Can't Lose and The Wonder Years in 1990 and 1991, respectively.

Her life story was documented on the Australian Broadcasting Corporation's Australian Story episode "In Her Father's Eyes" in 2007.

Hobbs now works as an interior designer and resides in Hollywood Hills.

== Personal life ==
Hobbs has a daughter, Lola Rose Thompson, with television producer/writer Chris Thompson. Hobbs was in a seven-year relationship with actor Al Pacino. She adopted a son, Nick David Hobbs, during her relationship with Pacino.
