= Tommy Hinkley =

American actor

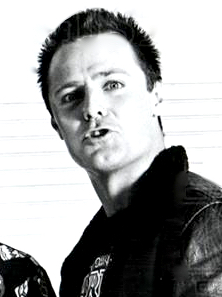
- Hinkley in Hard Knocks, 1987
- Occupation: Actor
- Years active: 1986–present
- Spouse: Tracey Needham (m. 1995)
- Children: 1

Tommy Hinkley is an American actor. He made his feature film debut in the comedy Back to the Beach (1987), and subsequently appeared in the Academy Award-winning short film Ray's Male Heterosexual Dance Hall (also 1987). The same year, he appeared as a lead character opposite Bill Maher in the short-lived Showtime series Hard Knocks.

Hinkley later had supporting roles in Men at Work (1990), the horror film Silent Night, Deadly Night 4: Initiation (also 1990), and the comedy The Little Vampire (2000).

== Life and career ==
Hinkley attended Culver High School in Culver, Oregon.

Hinkley's on-screen career began in the 1980s, including television guest roles, and periodic regular turns on TV series, including the short-lived Showtime series Hard Knocks (1987), that also featured Bill Maher. Having appeared in the Academy Award-winning Ray's Male Heterosexual Dance Hall, he has also been known for his roles in such popular box office draws as The Cable Guy (1996), The Little Vampire (2000), Ocean's Thirteen (2007) and Leatherheads (2008).

He also made several appearances in the first season of the sitcom Mad About You as Jay Selby, the best friend of Paul Buchman (played by Paul Reiser). He also voiced Earl Grunewald on the animated series Life with Louie. In 1995, he co-starred in the short-lived Fox TV sitcom The Preston Episodes with David Alan Grier.

That same year, Hinkley married actress Tracey Needham. In 1999, Needham gave birth to their daughter.

As of 2010, Hinkley worked as a teacher, teaching theatre arts to children in Boulder, Colorado.

== Filmography ==
=== Film ===
Year	Title	Role	Notes	Ref.
1987	Back to the Beach	Michael		
1987	Ray's Male Heterosexual Dance Hall	Andrew Northfield	Short film	
1989	The Terror Within	Neil		
1989	Lethal Weapon 2	Cop #2		
1990	Watchers II	Lab Assistant		
1990	Men at Work	Jeff		
1990	Silent Night, Deadly Night 4: Initiation	Hank		
1990	Naked Obsession	Mitch		
1990	Angel of Death	Rak Slade	Television film	
1991	Earth Angel	Val Boyd	Television film	
1991	L.A. Story	Ted		
1991	The Human Shield	Ben Matthews		
1992	Maid for Each Other	Ted Knowland	Television film	
1994	Star Trek Generations	Journalist #1		
1996	The Cable Guy	Basketball Player		
1997	Buried Alive II	Sheriff Jim Puller	Television film	
1998	Anarchy TV	Ralph Greed		
1999	Dirt Merchant	Mort Huskins		
1999	Pinot Grigio			
2000	Escape Under Pressure	Carl		
2000	Fail Safe	Senior Master Sergeant Collins	Televised play	
2000	The Little Vampire	Bob Thompson		
2002	Confessions of a Dangerous Mind	Hambone Man		
2003	Save It for Later	Rick O'Connor		
2004	Angel in the Family	Joe		
2007	Ocean's Thirteen	Roulette Dealer		
2008	The Flyboys	John McIntyre		
2008	Leatherheads	'Hardleg'		
2009	Bob Funk	Over Eaters Anonymous Guy		

=== Television ===
Year	Title	Role	Notes	Ref.
1987	Brothers	Jim Grant / Jim Dintzman	3 episodes	
1987	Hard Knocks	Nick Bronco	13 episodes	
1988	Empty Nest	The Bartender	Episode: "Harry's Vacation"	
1989	Something Is Out There	Ricky	Episode: "A Hearse of Another Color"	
1989	Who's the Boss?	Kyle Fletcher	Episode: "In Search of Tony"	
1990	China Beach	Simon	Episode: "Warriors"	
1990	Get a Life	Morgan	Episode: "A Family Affair"	
1991	The Golden Girls	Andy	Episode: "Melodrama"	
1991	Night Court	Curtis	Episode: "Harry's Fifteen Minutes"	
1991	Jake and the Fatman	Eddie	Episode: "Street of Dreams"	
1991	MacGyver	Neil	Episode: "Deadly Silents"	
1992–1993	Mad About You	Jay Selby	13 episodes	
1993	Murphy Brown	Tucker	Episode: "Ben Humboldt"	
1994	Ellen	Steve	Episode: "The Boyfriend Stealer"	
1994–1995	The 5 Mrs. Buchanans	Jesse Buchanan	4 episodes	
1995	Robin's Hoods	Chad Owens	Episode: "If Looks Could Kill"	
1995	The Preston Episodes	Derek Clooney	2 episodes	
1995–1997	Life with Louie	Earl Grunewald	11 episodes	
1997	Tracey Takes On...	Randy Amsterdam	Episode: "Movies"	
1997	The Secret World of Alex Mack	Mr. Carrington	2 Episode: "The Creeper" & "24 Hours"	
1998	Teen Angel	Casey Beauchamp	6 episodes	
1998	ER	Mr. Ellis	2 episodes	
1999	Martial Law	Don Turlington	Episode: "Call of the Wild"	
2000	Judging Amy	Mr. Saunders	Episode: "The Wee Hours"	
2000	Angel	C. Mulvill	Episode: "Are You Now or Have You Never Been"	
2000	That '70s Show	Cop	Episode: "Ice Shack"	
2001	The Division	Alan DeLorenzo / Paul DeLorenzo	4 episodes	
2002	Boomtown	Mr. Flannery	Episode: "Reelin' in the Years"	
2003	NCIS	Deer Hunter	Episode: "The Curse"	
2004	Cold Case	Billy Berkenpass Sr. (1987)	Episode: "The Lost Soul of Herman Lester"	
2004–2006	The Shield	Captain Steve Briggs	2 episodes	
2005	The Inside	Detective Douglas Price	Episode: "Everything Nice"	
2010	Zeke and Luther	Agent	Episode: "Old Nasty"	
