= The Naked Truth (TV series) =

1995 American television sitcom

- Genre: Sitcom
- Created by: Chris Thompson
- Starring: Téa Leoni; Holland Taylor; Mark Roberts; Amy Ryan; Jonathan Penner; Jack Blessing; Darryl Sivad; George Wendt; Chris Elliott; Tom Verica; Jim Rash; Amy Hill
- Composers: Dan Foliart (season 1); Alan Elliott (season 2); Jonathan Wolff (season 3)
- Country of origin: United States
- Original language: English
- No. of seasons: 3
- No. of episodes: 55 (7 unaired) (list of episodes)

Production
- Executive producers: Bernie Brillstein; Brad Grey (both; entire run); Chris Thompson (1995–96, season 1); Jay Daniel; Maya Forbes; Erin Braun; Michael Saltzman(both; 1997–98, season 3)
- Camera setup: Multi-camera
- Running time: 22 minutes
- Production companies: Brillstein-Grey Entertainment; Christopher Thompson Productions (1995–1996) (season 1); Columbia Pictures Television

Original release
- Network: ABC
- Release: September 13, 1995 – February 28, 1996
- Network: NBC
- Release: January 16, 1997 – May 25, 1998

The Naked Truth is an American sitcom television series that aired on ABC from September 13, 1995, to February 28, 1996, and on NBC from January 16, 1997, to May 25, 1998. The series stars Téa Leoni and Holland Taylor. The show took place at the office of a tabloid news publication.

== Plot ==
Pulitzer Prize nominated photographer Nora Wilde (Téa Leoni) divorces her rich, philandering husband Leland Banks, asking for nothing in the settlement except the use of her maiden name. Broke and without prospects for employment, after Leland blackballs her from respectable mainstream work, Nora seeks work at The Comet, a sleazy celebrity tabloid owned by Sir Rudolph Halley (Tim Curry) and run by ruthless Camilla Dane (Holland Taylor). Initially, Nora is repulsed by the depths to which she has to sink for her new job – she finds herself in demeaning situations such as stealing Anna Nicole Smith's urine to run a pregnancy test, and staking out the sewer for mutant alligators – but before long, she begins to feel at home. Nora's coworkers include egotistical Nicky Columbus (Jonathan Penner), a potential love interest; T.J. (Darryl Sivad), a humorless African-American man always clad in dark sunglasses; and Stupid Dave (Mark Roberts) who is mentally disabled. At home, Nora deals with deranged building manager Mr. Donner (Jack Blessing) and Chloe Banks (Amy Ryan), her best friend and former step-daughter.

In the second season, the show switched networks and was retooled. Meatball-mogul Les Polanski (George Wendt) buys The Comet, intending to make it a respectable publication. Gone were the outlandishly zany antics from the first season, and Stupid Dave was now merely referred to as Dave. Chloe disappears without explanation, as does Mr. Donner (since Nora has a new apartment). Mary Tyler Moore (replacing Dyan Cannon from season one) and George Segal both make frequent guest appearances as Nora's parents in season two, eventually moving into the apartment across the hall. Most episodes centered on Nora's romantic life and how her job could intrude on that.

Season three saw enormous changes. Camilla quits The Comet and moves on to rival tabloid The National Inquisitor, leaving most of the staff behind. By this point, she and Nora had become close, so she asks Nora to join her at the Inquisitor. Also moving to The Inquisitor was Dave, who was no longer mentally disabled. Their new coworkers include smug reporter Jake Sullivan (Tom Verica), photographer Suji (Amy Hill), studious fact checker Harris (Jim Rash), and Bradley Crosby (Chris Elliott), the self-proclaimed illegitimate son of Bing Crosby.

== History ==
The series was initially picked up by ABC under the title Wilde Again before it was premiered, but the title was changed back to The Naked Truth due to initial concerns about the similarity sounding title to NBC's recent cancellation of Something Wilder. The series began on ABC and was canceled after a single season despite ranking at #25 with an 11.4 rating. For its second season, the series moved to NBC with new cast members and a general retooling of the show away from its tabloid settings. The second season ranked at #4 with a 16.8 rating. Its third and final season plummeted to #74 and was canceled at the end of the season.

== Cast ==
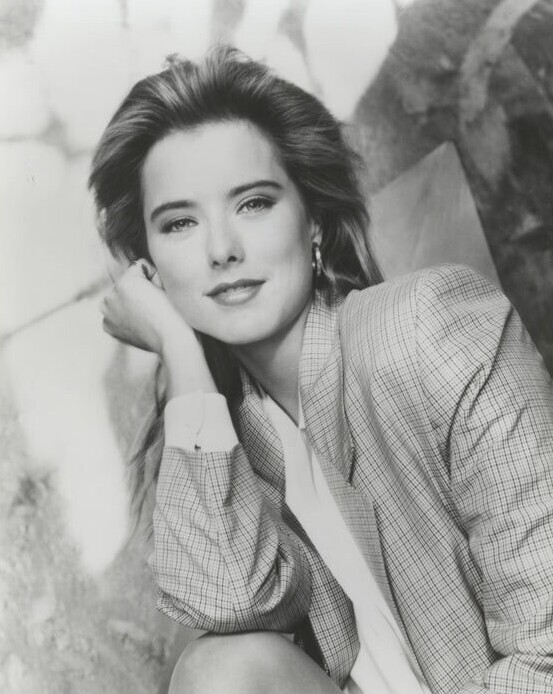
Téa Leoni, star of The Naked Truth

- Téa Leoni as Nora Wilde
- Holland Taylor as Camilla Dane
- Mark Roberts as Dave Fontaine
- Jonathan Penner as Nicky Columbus (seasons 1–2)
- Amy Ryan as Chloe Banks (season 1)
- Jack Blessing as Mr. Donner (season 1)
- Darryl Sivad as T.J. (seasons 1–2)
- George Wendt as Les Polanski (season 2)
- Chris Elliott as Bradley Crosby (season 3)
- Tom Verica as Jake Sullivan (season 3)
- Jim Rash as Harris Van Doren (season 3)
- Amy Hill as Suji (season 3)

== Episodes ==
Season	Episodes	Originally released			Rank	Rating
Season	Episodes	First released	Last released	Network	Rank	Rating
1	20	September 13, 1995	February 28, 1996	ABC	24	11.4
2	13	January 16, 1997	May 14, 1997	NBC	4	16.8
3	22 (Note: Episodes 16–22 never aired.)	September 22, 1997	May 25, 1998	NBC	—N/a	—N/a
