= Private Domain =

American musical group

- Origin: San Diego, California, U.S.
- Genres: Rock and Reggae
- Years active: 1985–present
- Label: Zia
- Members: Paul Shaffer; Jack Butler; Jim Reeves; Matt Taylor

Private Domain is an American pop/rock band. The band originated in San Diego, California, in 1985 (see 1985 in music). The band's members are songwriter Paul Shaffer (vocals; not to be confused with Paul Shaffer of the Late Show with David Letterman), songwriter Jack Butler (guitar), Jim Reeves (bass) and Matt Taylor (drums). Shaffer and Butler previously played together in the pop rock/reggae rock band Bratz, which released two albums, Bratz in 1980 and Absolute perfection in 1983.

Pato Banton was hired to rap on a Private Domain song written by Butler/Shaffer called "Absolute Perfection" also found on his 1987 album "Never Give In".

== Lineup ==
- Paul Shaffer – vocals
- Jack Butler – guitar
- Jim Reeves – bass
- Matt Taylor – drums

== Discography ==
=== Studio albums ===
- 1988 Private Domain
- 1994 Total Sanctuary
- 1998 Big Time Love
- 2002 Private Domain Unplugged
- 2007 Great Leaders

=== Soundtracks ===
- 1985 Back To The Beach
- 1985 Once Bitten
