= Dead on Time (1983 film) =

- Directed by: Lyndall Hobbs
- Written by: Rowan Atkinson; Richard Curtis
- Produced by: Lyndall Hobbs
- Starring: Rowan Atkinson; Peter Bull; Jo Kendall
- Cinematography: John Metcalfe
- Edited by: Richard Bedford
- Music by: Howard Goodall
- Production company: Michael White Productions
- Release date: February 1983
- Running time: 33 minutes
- Country: United Kingdom
- Language: English

Dead on Time is a 1983 British short film directed by Lyndall Hobbs and written by Richard Curtis and Rowan Atkinson; it is the first film co-written by the latter and his first lead role in a film production.

The film is also known as Whatever happened to Bernard Fripp.

== Plot ==
Bernard Fripp is a man who, on attending a routine check-up, is diagnosed by his doctor as having a rare disease leaving him only 30 minutes to live.

By the time he leaves the surgery, he only has 24 minutes left, in which he attempts to live life to the full; taking out his life savings, trying to make peace with God (via a vicar), attempting to learn about the significance of the Mona Lisa, reading the back cover of War and Peace to find out what happens in it, listening to Remo Giazotto's Adagio in G minor and looking for true love.

== Production ==
The featurette was shot in early 1982, at the same time Atkinson wrapped up taping Not The Nine O'Clock News and began working on The Black Adder, premièring later that year and getting a wide theatrical release in February 1983. The meek, socially awkward Bernard is a reworking of an earlier Atkinson character, Robert Box, who appeared on the 1979 special Canned Laughter, which shares a gag regarding the main character tripping over a "Please Help the Blind" sign. Both Fripp and Box have been cited to be prototypes for Mr. Bean.

== Cast ==
- Rowan Atkinson as Bernard Fripp
- Peter Bull as Old Man in Waiting Room
- Jo Kendall as Nurse
- Nigel Hawthorne as Doctor
- Nell Campbell as Teller #1
- Joshua White as Bank Customer
- Hugh Thomas as Teller #2
- Alex Norton as Foreigner
- Christopher Biggins as Bigot
- Rupert Everett as Bank Customer / Blind Man
- Adrian Edmondson as Fool (credited as Ade Edmonton)
- Robin Bailey as Intelligent Man
- Tim McInnerny as Customer
- Jim Broadbent as Priest and God
- Greta Scacchi as Pretty Girl
- Nigel Planer as Boring Friend
- Gorden Kaye as Moonie
- Leslie Ash as Girl in Café
- Richard Curtis as Customer in Café

The film features a large number of cameo parts for actors and actresses, often from the alternative comedy circuit, who would later star in their own comedy series, including Leslie Ash, Adrian Edmondson, Tim McInnerny and Nigel Planer. Richard Curtis makes a brief appearance as an angry café customer.

== Reception ==
The film was called 'a severely underrated short comedy film with a bizarre plot'.

"Fripp, much like the character from Canned Laughter, clearly had some influence in the creation of the Mr. Bean character, and the ITV film would be shown just as Atkinson's career was about to evolve from working as part of a talented ensemble to carrying his own prime time comedy series, with Blackadder debuting the following year." wrote Luke Yarwood of WhatCulture.
