= Canned Laughter (TV programme) =

- Title screen of the series, showing the character Robert Box.
- Also known as: Rowan Atkinson presents… Canned Laughter
- Created by: Rowan Atkinson
- Directed by: Geoffrey Sax
- Starring: Rowan Atkinson; Sue Holderness
- Country of origin: United Kingdom
- No. of episodes: 1

Production
- Running time: 30 minutes

Original release
- Network: ITV
- Release: 8 April 1979

Related
- Dead on Time; Mr. Bean

Rowan Atkinson presents... Canned Laughter is a British one-off comedy television programme featuring Rowan Atkinson, broadcast on 8 April 1979 on ITV. Atkinson plays three roles: the nerdy Robert Box (who has been cited as an early incarnation of the Mr. Bean character, albeit involving more dialogue), his sinister boss Mr Marshall, and would-be stand-up comic Dave Perry, as well as an uncredited role as a radio announcer. Produced by LWT, the thirty-minute episode was directed by Geoffrey Sax.

== Synopsis ==
=== Act 1 ===
The episode begins with Robert Box sleeping. He rises by the tune of a disco tune playing on his radio alarm, and then shines by the radio station jingle (leading to a clichéd advert for a deliberately unidentified product). He then heads to the mirror as he tries to figure out how to ask one woman colleague on a date. As the radio begins to play "Mr. Blue Sky" by ELO, the scene turns to Dave Perry who announces to neighbour Mrs Nolan that he has his first major gig at a "swish (posh) restaurant" in Camden Town. Mrs Nolan has been sued for divorce by her husband after 45 years of marriage.

Still at home, Robert shaves in a rather awkward fashion. He then finds out he is late for work and eats a spoonful of instant coffee and one of sugar, and takes a sip of cream and one of water, and finally shakes himself up before leaving his flat. Meanwhile, Perry takes a bus to Sloane Square, where a sarcastic bus conductor proceeds to take a slice off a £1 note since Dave just had 15 pence instead of the 16p the conductor charged him, disbelieving the fact that Perry was in fact a comedian.

The scene turns again to Box, who is shown tripping over a "Help the Blind" sign as he's hurrying to work. When he gets here, his employer Mr Marshall has refused the whole office a pay increase because most of the workers chain-smoke. (A co-worker then hides a cigarette in one of Robert's pockets). After the meeting, Box summons up the courage to ask Lorraine (Sue Holderness) on the date. The act ends with the cigarette setting Robert's coat on fire, with "Smoke Gets in Your Eyes" in the background.

=== Act 2 ===
The second act begins with the "Sarraceno" restaurant pianist playing "Smoke...". The scene quickly turns to Robert and Lorraine having a conversation about the place. Then they order dinner: Box asks for "soup and beef", Lorraine makes her order in French, much to Box's dismay, as he didn't understand a word. She explains that her father was stationed in Toulouse. Robert asks her about him, not knowing that he is dead.

Then the entertainment is presented: Dave Perry. However, what he expected to be his "big break" turned out to be a series of quips; Box is the only one laughing at his jokes, while Lorraine becomes increasingly annoyed. After Perry ends his routine unnoticed, Lorraine begins to tell Robert about her concern about diverse issues, such as the Third World and lemmings. The waiter then goes to ask them for dinner.

Box asks Lorraine to dance, hoping to get on her good side; unfortunately the dance floor is comically small. The dance turns to be a disaster: he wreaks havoc by tossing and turning her around the restaurant, and she leaves early. Mr Marshall is having dinner there too, and he decides to sack Robert on the spot. Despondent, the lonely and now unemployed Box is joined by equally-downtrodden Dave, who hasn't had a good night either. As the credits roll, Lorraine passes by a shop where she sees Robert instead of John Travolta, making her turn away.

== Cast ==
- Rowan Atkinson as Robert Box, Mr Marshall, and Dave Perry
- Sue Holderness as Lorraine
- Joan Scott as Mrs Nolan
- John J. Carney as the bus conductor
- George Belbin as a bus passenger
- George Romanov as a foreigner
- Michael Staniforth as Sanders
- Martin Wimbush as Lloyd
- Michael Brennan as a security guard
- Christopher Lillicrap as a waiter
- Alan Curtis as the head waiter
- Alan Hay as a pianist

== On other works ==
Atkinson reprised his Robert Box character in 1983 (now named "Bernard Fripp") for a theatrical comedy featurette called Dead on Time, which in turn reused the gag of the main character tripping over a "Help the Blind" sign. The Mr. Bean episode The Trouble with Mr. Bean (1991) partially reused the electric shaver gag (with Bean's nose hairs getting stuck on the shaver, whereas Robert shaved his whole face (except his eyebrows and tongue).

Robert Box's "no coffee mug" routine later appeared in the 1992 series Funny Business, in which Atkinson played a silent comedy character called Kevin Bartholomew. The same gag would later be used again in Bean, the 1997 Mr. Bean feature film.
