= Chris Thompson (TV producer) =

American television writer (1952–2015)

- Born: Christopher Thompson; 1952; Detroit, Michigan, U.S.
- Died: June 26, 2015 (aged 63); Los Angeles, California, U.S.
- Occupations: Television writer, producer
- Years active: 1977–2015
- Spouse(s): Lyndall Hobbs (m. 1986; div. 1989) Tracy Bjork (m. 1990; div. 2003) Curran Sympson (m. 2008)
- Children: 3

Chris Thompson (1952 – June 26, 2015) was an American television writer and producer. Beginning in 1977, he wrote and produced for the television series Laverne & Shirley and The Larry Sanders Show. He had also created, written and produced Bosom Buddies, The Naked Truth, Action, Ladies Man and the Disney Channel original series, Shake It Up, as well co-written the feature films Jumpin' Jack Flash and Back to the Beach.

== Career ==
Born Christopher Thompson, he began his career at the age of 23, when he was approached by a producer who was impressed by his improv performance at the Off The Wall theater in Los Angeles. Thompson thought this was his big acting break, but it was really the start of his prolific writing and producing career (the producer offered him an apprentice writing position on the series Sirota's Court). Soon after, he was introduced to producer Garry Marshall and worked as a writer on Blansky's Beauties starring Nancy Walker and Scott Baio, followed by Laverne & Shirley, where he worked as a writer, and later as an executive producer, for seven years. Thompson went on to create the buddy comedy Bosom Buddies for Paramount Studios. His other writing and producing credits include The Naked Truth, Action, Ladies Man, The Larry Sanders Show, House Rules, Hard Knocks and over 30 pilots for various networks and studios. His feature film writing credits include Jumpin' Jack Flash, and Back to the Beach. In 2010, Thompson created and executive produced the Disney Channel dance-driven sitcom Shake It Up He left the series after the first season leaving Rob Lotterstein as showrunner.

== Personal life and death ==
Thompson was born in Detroit, Michigan and raised in Los Angeles. In 1986, Thompson married director Lyndall Hobbs. Together they had one daughter, Lola Rose Thompson. They divorced in 1989.

Thompson married Tracy Bjork in 1990, and they have two children, Taylor and Richard. They were married for thirteen years.

Thompson married Curran Sympson in 2008.

Thompson died in actor Tim Curry's home on June 26, 2015, in Toluca Lake, Los Angeles after a long illness. Following his death, Thompson was paid tribute from stars he had worked with, including Bella Thorne, who said that Thompson had been "like a father to her at an early age." He lived with his wife of seven years, Curran Sympson Thompson, with their dog Roscoe and cat Ichi.

== Filmography ==
- Sirota's Court (1976–1977) (TV)
- Blansky's Beauties (1977) (TV)
- Laverne & Shirley (1977–1979) (TV)
- Bosom Buddies (1980–1982) (TV)
- The President of Love (1984) (TV)
- Slickers (1985) (TV)
- Jumpin' Jack Flash (with Charles Shyer, Nancy Meyers and David Franzoni) (1986)
- Hard Knocks (1987) (TV)
- Back to the Beach (with Peter Krikes and Steve Meerson) (1987)
- Lola (1990) (TV)
- Big Deals (1991) (TV)
- The Larry Sanders Show (1992–1993) (TV)
- Dave's World (1994) (TV)
- The Naked Truth (1995–1997) (TV)
- House Rules (1998) (TV)
- Action (1999) (TV)
- Ladies Man (1999) (TV)
- Trash (2003) (TV)
- Shake It Up (2010–2013) (TV)
