= Parranda =

Christmas season festivities in Puerto Rico

Parranda(s)
- Official name: Parranda(s)
- Observed by: Puerto Ricans and Dominicans
- Type: Local, religious, historical
- Significance: Celebration of the Christmas season
- Celebrations: Music, food, drinks, dancing
- Observances: Yearly
- Date: December, could spill into early January
- Duration: Several hours
- Frequency: Annual
- Related to: Culture and Religion

A parranda (English: party or spree) is a Puerto Rican music tradition that takes place in Puerto Rico during the Christmas holiday season. Parrandas are social events that feature traditional Puerto Rican music, food, and drinks. The traditional events have been likened to Christmas caroling, but the contents of the songs are secular rather than religious. They are sometimes carried out in the evening, but most traditionally occur in the night, even into the wee hours of the morning. The songs sung are almost exclusively aguinaldos. In this tradition, people go to their friends' or relatives' homes "singing songs, eating pasteles (similar to tamales) and arroz con dulce (rice pudding), sipping coquito and picking up people along the way" who then join in to proceed to the next home.

== Planning and purpose ==
Parrandas are often spontaneous events and traditionally occur anytime from the late evening to the wee hours of the morning, visiting targeted extended family members or friends in their homes and intentionally waking them up to the parranda music. They reportedly generate a sense of Puerto Ricanness, unity and camaraderie among both those bringing the music as well as the targeted families receiving it. Those participating, whether playing an instrument or singing, are called parranderos. Instruments used in addition to the voice include the culturally significant instruments of Cuatro, maracas, guiro, palitos, tambora, panderata, panderos (requinto, seguidor and tumbador), trumpet, tambora, and the guitar.

== Parranda "plot" and venues ==
One form how the event occurs is most traditionally as follows: A group of friends of the homeowner, musical instruments in hand, arrives at their target house sometime after 10 PM and then, quietly, make their way to the porch or as close to it as possible. The parranda leader (generally, their musical director) signals everyone to start playing their instruments and singing. The music and singing surprises the sleeping dwellers who get up, turns on the inside and outside lights and invites the "parranderos" into the house. Once in, they are treated to refreshments (most homes will be well-stocked with refreshments and Christmas-time traditional foods), and everyone eats and may also dance as parranderos take turns eating and playing the music. The party will go on for about an hour or two, after which, the residents will join the parranderos, with their own instruments if they have them, and move on to the next target residence. As the group grows, the group makes sure to leave for last those homes in which they guess there will be the most food available to support the growing group or, they simply head to the home of one of the parranderos which has already pre-arranged serving the last meal of the night - the traditional asopao de pollo, a Puerto Rican chicken soup. The party will generally be over around dawn, when everyone then wishes everyone else good-night and head to their respective homes to sleep.

== Associated terms and events ==
The term trulla or trulla navideña is to the group of people that get together to participate in the parranda. It includes singers, musicians, and anyone else that joins the group. The term asalto navideño (literally, "Christmas assault") is used to describe to the surprise visit by the trulla group when they descend upon their sleeping friends at their homes to sing Puerto Rican Christmastime songs to them after they have gone to sleep.

Parrandas oftentimes include a few minutes reciting bombas, improvised trovador-like musico-poetic compositions by the parranda participants intended to add fun and excitement to the parranda event.

== In popular culture ==
- The song by Gilberto Santa Rosa (featuring Tony Vega) titled Llegó la Navidad (Sony BMG Music, 2011 {Album: "Top Latino Navidad Volume 2"},UPC 886979550124), opens with "Llegó la Navidad, y las parrandas se oyen por doquiera..." (The Christmas season has arrived, and the parrandas can be heard everywhere...)
- "La Parranda Fania" is a music album with Hector Lavoe, Yomo Toro and Daniel Santos. The album cover says "La Parranda Fania...A Gozar, A Bailar, A Parrandear" (La Parranda Fania...Let's Enjoy, Let's Dance, Let's Go on Parrandas).
- Ivan Perez & Luis Rivera, have a plena song titled "Parrandiando Con Santa Claus" (roughly translated into "Going on Parrandas with Santa Claus"), published in 2002 under the label "Ivan Perez & Luis Rivera" (Album: "El Lechón Pasmao", ASIN B000QM4QVQ)
- La Sonora Ponceña's song titled Aguinaldo Antillano (Fania Records, 1971, Album: "Rumbon Navideño", ASIN B0083L66AG), opens with "Esta es la parranda de los Antillanos..." (This is the parranda of the Antillean people...)
- In the episode "Navidad" of Elena of Avalor, Princess Elena leads the people of Avalor City on a parranda, to remind them of the spirit of Navidad, singing a song with them titled "Let Love Light the Way."

== See also ==
- Vicente Carattini
- Parang
- Wassailing
