= Firebuds =

American animated children's TV series

- Genre: Educational; Comedy; Musical
- Created by: Craig Gerber
- Voices of: Declan Whaley; Yonas Kibreab; Terrence Little Gardenhigh; Carter Jones; Elisha "EJ" Williams; Vivian Vencer; Lily Sanfelippo; JeCobi Swain; Caleb Paddock
- Theme music composer: Beau Black
- Opening theme: "Firebuds Let's Roll", written by Beau Black & Craig Gerber
- Ending theme: "Firebuds on the Move" (Instrumental)
- Composers: Beau Black (songs); Frederik Wiedmann (score)
- Country of origin: United States
- Original language: English
- No. of seasons: 3
- No. of episodes: 60 (119 segments)

Production
- Executive producer: Craig Gerber
- Producer: Craig Simpson
- Running time: 24–25 minutes
- Production companies: Electric Emu Productions; Disney Television Animation (Note: Animation production by ICON Creative Studio)

Original release
- Network: Disney Jr.
- Release: September 21, 2022 – December 4, 2025

Firebuds is an American animated children's comedy television series created by Craig Gerber, produced by Electric Emu Productions and Disney Television Animation. The series premiered on Disney Jr. on September 21, 2022. In January 2023, the series was renewed for a second season, which premiered on November 1, 2023. In June 2023, the series was renewed for a third season which premiered on September 15, 2025 on Disney Jr.

On March 21, 2025, Gerber announced that the series would be ending after three seasons, with most of the cast moving on to produce Sofia the First: Royal Magic.

== Premise ==
In a world where human and talking vehicles co-exist, a group of kids and their rescue buddies, The Firebuds go through the communities of Gearbox Grove and Motopolis and help keep them safe from danger.

== Characters ==
=== Main ===
- Bo Bayani (voiced by Declan Whaley in Season 1–early Season 3 and Yonas Kibreab in late Season 3) is a Jewish Filipino-American boy who is an aspiring firefighter. He is the leader of the Firebuds.
- Flash Fireson (voiced by Terrence Little Gardenhigh in Season 1, Carter Jones in Season 2 and Elisha "EJ" Williams in Season 3) is Bo's firetruck vroom-mate. He gets very hyperactive, especially when rescuing people and vehicles.
- Violet Vega-Vaughn (voiced by Vivian Vencer) is a Japanese American girl who is an aspiring paramedic. She loves gymnastics and going fast.
- Axl Ambrose (voiced by Lily Sanfelippo) is Violet's ambulance vroom-mate. She loves carkour and going fast like Violet. Axl has dyscalculia.
- Jayden Jones (voiced by JeCobi Swain) is an African-American boy who is an aspiring cop. He is an inventor who loves to eat.
- Piston Porter (voiced by Caleb Paddock) is Jayden's police car vroom-mate. He loves rules and being safe.

=== Recurring ===
- Chief Bill Bayani (voiced by Lou Diamond Phillips) is Bo's father and co-chief of the Gearbox Grove Fire Department. He is a Roman Catholic Filipino man.
- Chief Faye Fireson (voiced by Yvette Nicole Brown) is Flash's mother and co-chief of the Gearbox Grove Fire Department.
- Beth Bayani (voiced by Melissa Rauch) is Bo's mother who is a therapist. She is a Jewish woman.
- Floyd Fireson (voiced by Kevin Michael Richardson) is Flash's father who is a carchitect.
- Val Vega-Vaughn (voiced by Natalie Morales) is Violet's paramedic adoptive mother.
- Arnie Ambrose (voiced by Stephen Guarino) is Axl's ambulance father.
- Viv Vega-Vaughn (voiced by Allison Case) is Violet's mechanic adoptive mother.
- AJ Ambrose (voiced by Ian James Corlett) is Axl's semi-hauler father.
- Jenna Jones (voiced by LaChanze) is Jayden's mother and Deputy Chief of the Bureau of Community Support for the Motopolis Police Department.
- Pete Porter (voiced by Sean Kenin) is Piston's father and Jenna's M.P.D. partner.
- Jamal Jones (voiced by Brandon Victor Dixon) is Jayden's father who is a traffic cop for the Motopolis Police Department.
- Pam Porter (voiced by Hope Levy) is Piston's mother and Jamal's M.P.D. partner.
- Jazzy Jones (voiced by Lauren "Lolo" Spencer) is Jayden's younger sister with spina bifida.
- Piper Porter (voiced by Sammi Haney) is Piston's sister and Jazzy's electric wheelchair vroom-mate.
- June Ramirez (voiced by Tessa Espinola) is a news reporter and a friend of the Firebuds.
- Vance (voiced by Max Mitchell in Season 1 and Remi Tuckman in Season 2) is June's vroom-mate and news camera operator.
- Harry Haphazard (voiced by Cameron Crovetti in Season 1–early Season 2 and Matthew Lamb in late Season 2–Season 3) is a friend of the Firebuds and Violet's biggest fan.
- Carly (voiced by Abigail Zoe Lewis) is Harry's vroom-mate and Axl's biggest fan.
- Iggy "Ignatius" Irons (voiced by Benjamin Valic) is the Firebuds' rebellious neighbor and Zack’s son. His full name is Ignatius.
- Rod "Rodrick" Royce (voiced by Henry Kaufman) is Iggy's rebellious vroom-mate and Reno’s son. His full name is Rodrick.
- Zack Irons (voiced by Trevor Devall) is Iggy’s father and Reno’s vroom-mate.
- Reno Royce (voiced by Richard Steven Horvitz) is Zack’s vroom-mate and Rod’s father.
- Chef Al (voiced by José Andrés) is the chef and co-owner of the Overdrive Cafe.
- Chef Fernando (voiced by Óscar Núñez) is Chef Al's food truck vroom-mate and co-owner of the Overdrive Cafe.
- Zip (voiced by Nylan Parthipan), Pow (voiced by Grayson Boulom), and Bang (voiced by Gavin McCrillis), are three small rambunctious cars and brothers.
- Marina Ramirez (voiced by Aimee Carrero) is June's mother and news reporter.
- Vanessa (voiced by Ally Dixon) is Vance's mother and Marina's vroom-mate and news camera operator.
- Halo (voiced by Jack Stanton in Season 2 and Nick A. Fisher in Season 3) is a helicopter who's in a lot of clubs.
- Cory (voiced by Kayden Alexander Koshelev) is Halo's vroom-mate. Cory is non-binary.
- Bubba (voiced by Nathan Arenas) is a jet-powered dirigible. He used to be a member of the Riley Gang until they abandoned him. Now he's an ally of the Firebuds.
- Ripley (voiced by Sydney Russel) is the leader of the Aquabuds.
- Cruz (voiced by Ynairaly Simo) is the team's second-in-command and a vroom-mate of Ripley.
- Drift (voiced by Luke Lowe) is a co-star ship.
- Kailani (voiced by Kai Zen) is a lifeguard and Drift's vroom-mate.
- Marin (voiced by Carter Rockwood) is a Rescue Launch.
- Lee (voiced by Sasha Knight) is a counterpart and Marin's vroom-mate.

=== Villains ===
- The Riley Gang are a gang of young thieves and the Firebuds' arch-enemies.
  - Wayne Riley (voiced by Atticus Shaffer) is the leader of the Riley Gang. He invents tools for his crimes and has heterochromia (green eye on the right and blue eye on the left).
  - Grant (voiced by Cleo Berry) is Wayne's vroom-mate in crime.
  - Wiley Riley (voiced by Luna Bella Zamora) is Wayne's sister and partner in crime.
  - Gauge (voiced by Kensington Tallman) is Wiley's vroom-mate in crime. She gets annoyed when people do not credit her for a crime she and Wiley commit.
- The Wild Wheels are the sidekicks of Wiley Riley.
  - Claire and Harley are disguised motorcyclists.
  - Cruiser and Heat (voiced by Alyssa Cheatham & Jack Fisher) are Claire and Harley's vroom-mates in crime.
- Louie Lam (voiced by Sean Kenin) is a robber who isn't that smart.
- Throttle (voiced by Nat Faxon) is Louis' vroom-mate in crime who's favorite thing to steal is toys.
- Scarlett (voiced by Bailee Bonic) is a girl who uses distractions to commit crimes.
- Skid (voiced by Sabrina Glow) is Scarlett's vroom-mate who has the power to travel on land, sea, and air.

== Episodes ==
=== Series overview ===
Season	Episodes	Originally released	
Season	Episodes	First released	Last released
1	25	September 21, 2022	August 4, 2023
2	23	November 1, 2023	May 5, 2025
3	12	September 15, 2025	December 4, 2025

=== Season 1 (2022–23) ===
No. overall	No. in season	Title	Directed by	Written by	Storyboard by	Original release date	Prod. code	U.S. viewers (millions)
1	1	"Car in a Tree"	Robb Pratt	Craig Gerber	Julius Aguimatang	September 21, 2022	101	0.19
1	1	"Dalmatian Day"	Robb Pratt	Craig Gerber	Kris Wimberly	September 21, 2022	101	0.19
2	2	"Hubcap Heist"	Julius Aguimatang	Matt Hoverman	Alan Caldwell & Cindy Quach	September 21, 2022	102	0.16
2	2	"Food Truck Fiasco"	Kris Wimberly	Krystal Banzon	Aldin Baroza & Cindy Quach	September 21, 2022	102	0.16
3	3	"Treehouse Trouble"	Julius Aguimatang	Leanna Dindal	Milo Neuman & Kiara Zhao	September 22, 2022 (Note: This episode was first released on Disney+ on September 21, 2022.)	103	N/A
3	3	"The Getaway Car That Got Away"	Kris Wimberly	Jeremy Shipp	Angie Henderson & Milo Neuman	September 22, 2022	103	N/A
4	4	"Picnic Pile-Up"	Julius Aguimatang	Krystal Banzon	Troy Adomitis & David "Pez" Hofmann	September 23, 2022	104	N/A
4	4	"Duo Dash"	Kris Wimberly	Norma P. Sepulveda	David "Pez" Hofmann & Kevin Pawlak	September 23, 2022	104	N/A
5	5	"The Not-So Haunted House"	Julius Aguimatang	Leanna Dindal	Renee Camille Badua & Cindy Quach	September 30, 2022	114	0.22
5	5	"Halloween Heroes"	Kris Wimberly	Norma P. Sepulveda	Renee Camille Badua & Aldin Baroza	September 30, 2022	114	0.22
6	6	"Sleepover Stakeout"	Julius Aguimatang	Jeremy Shipp	Julius Aguimatang, Antony Mazzotta & Cindy Quach	October 7, 2022	105	0.13
6	6	"Rescue Club"	Kris Wimberly	Leanna Dindal	Aldin Baroza, Marie Lum & Kris Wimberly	October 7, 2022	105	0.13
7	7	"Cliffhanger"	Julius Aguimatang	Norma P. Sepulveda	Milo Neuman & Kiara Zhao	October 14, 2022	106	0.11
7	7	"The Very First Fire"	Kris Wimberly	Krystal Banzon	Angie Henderson & Kiara Zhao	October 14, 2022	106	0.11
8	8	"Marsh Mayhem"	Julius Aguimatang	Norma P. Sepulveda	Julius Aguimatang, Renee Camille Badua & Cindy Quach	October 21, 2022	108	0.16
8	8	"The Art of Friendship"	Kris Wimberly	Krystal Banzon	Renee Camille Badua & Cindy Quach	October 21, 2022	108	0.16
9	9	"Lights Out"	Julius Aguimatang	Krystal Banzon	Renee Camille Badua & Cindy Quach	October 28, 2022	111	0.23
9	9	"Handle with Car"	Kris Wimberly	Jeremy Shipp	Aldin Baroza & Cindy Quach	October 28, 2022	111	0.23
10	10	"Transmission Impossible"	Kris Wimberly	Leanna Dindal	Angie Henderson, Josiah Iantorno, Marie Lum & Lila Martinez	November 4, 2022	109	0.14
10	10	"Carkour"	Julius Aguimatang	Jeremy Shipp	Lila Martinez & Milo Neuman	November 4, 2022	109	0.14
11	11	"Care-A-Van Club"	Julius Aguimatang	Alyssa Stratton	Troy Adomitis, David "Pez" Hofmann & Josiah Iantorno	November 11, 2022	110	0.18
11	11	"Mud About You"	Kris Wimberly	Norma P. Sepulveda	David "Pez" Hofmann & Kevin Pawlak	November 11, 2022	110	0.18
12	12	"River Rescue"	Julius Aguimatang	Jeremy Shipp	David "Pez" Hofmann & Kevin Pawlak	November 18, 2022	107	0.16
12	12	"Big Tread"	Kris Wimberly	Leanna Dindal	Troy Adomitis & Kevin Pawlak	November 18, 2022	107	0.16
13	13	"Hanukkah Hullabaloo"	Kris Wimberly	Jeremy Shipp	Angie Henderson & Kiara Zhao	November 28, 2022	115	0.30
13	13	"The Christmas Car-Sled Race"	Julius Aguimatang	Krystal Banzon	Milo Neuman & Kiara Zhao	November 28, 2022	115	0.30
14	14	"Call of the Siren"	Julius Aguimatang	Norma P. Sepulveda	David Chlystek, Antony Mazzotta & Milo Neuman	December 9, 2022	112	0.15
14	14	"Jamal's Jam"	Kris Wimberly	Leanna Dindal	David Chlystek, Angie Henderson & Marie Lum	December 9, 2022	112	0.15
15	15	"Bayani Cookout"	Julius Aguimatang	Krystal Banzon	Julius Aguimatang, David "Pez" Hofmann & Kevin Pawlak	December 16, 2022	113	0.13
15	15	"Rest of the Best"	Kris Wimberly	Jeremy Shipp	Troy Adomitis, David "Pez" Hofmann & Kiara Zhao	December 16, 2022	113	0.13
16	16	"Piston's Driving School"	Julius Aguimatang	Leanna Dindal	Ruth Baraz, David "Pez" Hofmann, Antony Mazzotta & Kevin Pawlak	January 13, 2023	116	0.15
16	16	"Jazzyland"	Kris Wimberly	Norma P. Sepulveda	Troy Adomitis, Marie Lum & Kevin Pawlak	January 13, 2023	116	0.15
17	17	"Puppy Pursuit"	Julius Aguimatang	Krystal Banzon	Julius Aguimatang, Renee Camille Badua, Ruth Baraz, Antony Mazzotta & Cindy Quach	February 3, 2023	117	0.20
17	17	"The Ice Cream Truck Bandits"	Kris Wimberly	Alyssa Stratton	Aldin Baroza & Cindy Quach	February 3, 2023	117	0.20
18	18	"Cleft Hood"	Julius Aguimatang	Jeremy Shipp	Milo Neuman & Kiara Zhao	March 10, 2023	118	0.15
18	18	"The Case of the Disappearing Doghouses"	Kris Wimberly	Leanna Dindal	Angie Henderson & Milo Neuman	March 10, 2023	118	0.15
19	19	"All That Jazzy"	Julius Aguimatang	Norma P. Sepulveda & Alyssa Stratton	Julius Aguimatang, Ruth Baraz, David "Pez" Hofmann, Antony Mazzotta & Kevin Pawlak	April 7, 2023 (Note: This episode was first released on Disney+ on March 15, 2023.)	119	0.21
19	19	"Iguana Hold Your Hand"	Kris Wimberly	Krystal Banzon	Troy Adomitis, David "Pez" Hofmann & Josiah A. Iantorno	April 7, 2023	119	0.21
20	20	"Shelter Island"	Julius Aguimatang	Jeremy Shipp	Renee Camille Badua, Ruth Baraz & Cindy Quach	May 4, 2023	120	0.10
20	20	"Escape from Shelter Island"	Kris Wimberly	Leanna Dindal	Aldin Baroza & Cindy Quach	May 4, 2023	120	0.10
21	21	"The Super Safety Show"	Julius Aguimatang	Krystal Banzon	Milo Neuman & Kiara Zhao	June 30, 2023 (Note: This episode was first released on Disney+ on May 31, 2023.)	121	N/A
21	21	"Job-O-Rama Day"	Kris Wimberly	Alyssa Stratton	Angie Henderson & Kiara Zhao	June 30, 2023	121	N/A
22	22	"Star Vehicle"	Julius Aguimatang	Krystal Banzon	Renee Camille Badua & Cindy Quach	July 7, 2023	123	N/A
22	22	"Firebuds Fever"	Kris Wimberly	Alyssa Stratton	Renee Camille Badua & Aldin Baroza	July 7, 2023	123	N/A
23	23	"The Birthday Blaze"	Julius Aguimatang	Jeremy Shipp	Angie Henderson & Milo Neuman	July 14, 2023	124	0.13
23	23	"Everybody Loves Axl"	Kris Wimberly	Leanna Dindal	Milo Neuman & Kiara Zhao	July 14, 2023	124	0.13
24	24	"The Four Door Troubadours"	Julius Aguimatang	Krystal Banzon	Ruth Baraz, David "Pez" Hofmann, Antony Mazzotta & Kevin Pawlak	July 21, 2023	125	0.06
24	24	"Moto-Polo!"	Kris Wimberly	Alyssa Stratton	Troy Adomitis, David "Pez" Hofmann, Josiah A. Iantorno & Marie Lum	July 21, 2023	125	0.06
25	25	"Roller Coaster Rescue"	Julius Aguimatang	Jeremy Shipp	David "Pez" Hofmann, Antony Mazzotta & Kevin Pawlak	August 4, 2023	122	0.13
25	25	"The Night Shift"	Kris Wimberly	Leanna Dindal	Troy Adomitis, Marie Lum, Cindy Quach & Kevin Pawlak	August 4, 2023	122	0.13
Note: This is the last episode where Terrence Little Gardenhigh voices Flash.

=== Season 2 (2023–25) ===
No. overall	No. in season	Title	Directed by	Written by	Storyboard by	Original release date	Prod. code	U.S. viewers (millions)
26	1	"Hello, Halo!"	Julius Aguimatang	Leanna Dindal	Ruth Baraz, Cindy Quach & Antony Mazzotta	November 1, 2023	201	0.18
26	1	"What's Up, Woodpecker?"	Kris Wimberly	Alyssa Stratton	Aldin Baroza & Cindy Quach	November 1, 2023	201	0.18
Note: This is the first episode where Carter Jones voices Flash.
27	2	"Sugar Crash"	Julius Aguimatang	Krystal Banzon	Taylor Parrish & Kiara Zhao	November 2, 2023 (Note: This episode was released on Disney+ on November 1, 2023.)	202	0.16
27	2	"The Cut N' Chrome Caper"	Kris Wimberly	Walinase J. Mbekeani	Renee Camille Badua & Taylor Parrish	November 2, 2023	202	0.16
28	3	"Mayhem at the Museum"	Julius Aguimatang	John N. Huss	Troy Adomitis & Jeff Gordon	November 3, 2023	203	0.19
28	3	"Wrong Way Rescue"	Kris Wimberly	Leanna Dindal	Jeff Gordon & Angie Henderson	November 3, 2023	203	0.19
29	4	"Apple Pie Peril"	Julius Aguimatang	Alyssa Stratton	Ruth Baraz & Cindy Quach	November 10, 2023	204	0.18
29	4	"Hike & Seek"	Kris Wimberly	Jeremy Shipp	Aldin Baroza & Cindy Quach	November 10, 2023	204	0.18
30	5	"Blizzard Buds"	Julius Aguimatang	Leanna Dindal	Troy Adomitis, Jeff Gordon & Milo Neuman	November 30, 2023	206	0.11
30	5	"Parade Escapade"	Kris Wimberly	Alyssa Stratton	Jeff Gordon & Angie Henderson	November 30, 2023	206	0.11
31	6	"Annie Spokely"	Julius Aguimatang	Leanna Dindal	Taylor Parrish & Kiara Zhao	December 15, 2023	211	0.11
31	6	"Ingrid on Ice"	Kris Wimberly	Walinase J. Mbekeani	Renee Camille Badua, Marie Lum & Taylor Parrish	December 15, 2023	211	0.11
32	7	"Science Fair Snafu"	Julius Aguimatang	John N. Huss	Troy Adomitis, Jeff Gordon & Antony Mazzotta	January 12, 2024	212	0.11
32	7	"The Scavenger Hunt"	Kris Wimberly	Jeremy Shipp	Jeff Gordon, Angie Henderson & Josiah A. Iantorno	January 12, 2024	212	0.11
33	8	"Balancing Act"	Julius Aguimatang	Krystal Banzon	Taylor Parrish & Kiara Zhao	February 9, 2024	214	0.12
33	8	"Monster Truck Piston"	Kris Wimberly	Leanna Dindal	Renee Camille Badua & Taylor Parrish	February 9, 2024	214	0.12
34	9	"Skitty Kitty"	Julius Aguimatang	Alyssa Stratton	Troy Adomitis & Jeff Gordon	March 8, 2024	209	0.16
34	9	"Heat Wave"	Kris Wimberly	Jeremy Shipp	Jeff Gordon & Angie Henderson	March 8, 2024	209	0.16
35	10	"Wayne's Trains and Automobiles"	Julius Aguimatang	John N. Huss	Troy Adomitis & Jeff Gordon	March 22, 2024	215	0.10
35	10	"Jazzy Buds"	Kris Wimberly	Jeremy Shipp	Jeff Gordon & Angie Henderson	March 22, 2024	215	0.10
36	11	"The Drive Along"	Julius Aguimatang	Jeremy Shipp	Ruth Baraz, Antony Mazzotta & Cindy Quach	May 3, 2024	207	0.07
36	11	"Rescue Club Rangers"	Kris Wimberly	John N. Huss	Aldin Baroza, Marie Lum & Cindy Quach	May 3, 2024	207	0.07
37	12	"Fire Tower Frenzy"	Julius Aguimatang	Krystal Banzon	Taylor Parrish & Kiara Zhao	May 10, 2024	208	0.06
37	12	"What's Cookin"	Kris Wimberly	Leanna Dindal	Renee Camille Badua & Taylor Parrish	May 10, 2024	208	0.06
38	13	"Woodland Wiley"	Julius Aguimatang	Jeremy Shipp	Ruth Baraz & Cindy Quach	May 17, 2024	219	0.07
38	13	"P.I. Piston"	Kris Wimberly	Alyssa Stratton	Aldin Baroza & Cindy Quach	May 17, 2024	219	0.07
39	14	"Mayor for the Day"	Julius Aguimatang	John N. Huss	Troy Adomitis & Jeff Gordon	May 24, 2024	218	N/A
39	14	"Dozer Disaster"	Kris Wimberly	Leanna Dindal	Jeff Gordon & Angie Henderson	May 24, 2024	218	N/A
40	15	"Haywire Halo"	Julius Aguimatang	John N. Huss	Ruth Baraz & Cindy Quach	May 31, 2024	210	N/A
40	15	"Smorgasburger"	Kris Wimberly	Alyssa Stratton	Aldin Baroza & Cindy Quach	May 31, 2024	210	N/A
41	16	"Chrome Crushers"	Julius Aguimatang	Krystal Banzon	Julius Aguimatang, Ruth Baraz, Antony Mazzotta, & Cindy Quach	N/A	213	TBD
41	16	"Windy Wheels"	Kris Wimberly	Alyssa Stratton	Aldin Baroza & Cindy Quach	June 7, 2024	213	TBD
42	17	"Full-Time Flash"	Julius Aguimatang	John N. Huss	Taylor Parrish & Kiara Zhao	June 14, 2024	205	N/A
42	17	"Bubba Trouble"	Kris Wimberly	Leanna Dindal	Renee Camille Badua & Taylor Parrish	June 14, 2024	205	N/A
43	18	"Scarlett & Skid"	Julius Aguimatang	John N. Huss	Ruth Baraz & Cindy Quach	June 28, 2024	220	N/A
43	18	"Alpine Adventure"	Kris Wimberly	Leanna Dindal	Aldin Baroza & Cindy Quach	June 28, 2024	220	N/A
44	19	"Guac and Roll"	Julius Aguimatang	Krystal Banzon	Troy Adomitis, Jeff Gordon, & Antony Mazzotta	July 5, 2024	221	N/A
44	19	"All-Terrain Trek"	Kris Wimberly	Alyssa Stratton	Jeff Gordon & Angie Henderson	July 5, 2024	221	N/A
45	20	"The Camp Fire!"	Julius Aguimatang & Kris Wimberly	Leanna Dindal	Ruth Baraz, Cindy Quach, Aldin Baroza, & Kris Wimberly	July 24, 2024	216	N/A
46	21	"The Haunted HQ"	Julius Aguimatang	John N. Huss	Taylor Parrish & Kiara Zhao	October 5, 2024 (Note: This episode was released on Disney+ on July 24, 2024.)	217	N/A
46	21	"All Souls' Surprise"	Kris Wimberly	Krystal Banzon	Renee Camille Badua & Taylor Parrish	October 5, 2024	217	N/A
47	22	"Bamboozled Bo"	Julius Aguimatang	Alexandra Otto	Taylor Parrish & Kiara Zhao	October 7, 2024	222	N/A
47	22	"Food in a Flash"	Kris Wimberly	Alyssa Stratton	Renee Camille Badua & Taylor Parrish	October 7, 2024	222	N/A
48	23	"Mothers' Day Mess"	Julius Aguimatang	Krystal Banzon	Taylor Parrish & Kiara Zhao	April 28, 2025	223	N/A
48	23	"Hey, Dude"	Kris Wimberly	Alyssa Stratton	Renee Camille Badua & Taylor Parrish	May 5, 2025	223	N/A
Note: This is the last episode where Carter Jones voices Flash.

=== Season 3 (2025) ===
No. overall	No. in season	Title	Directed by	Written by	Storyboard by	Original release date	Prod. code	U.S. viewers (millions)
49	1	"Scarlett & Skid Strike Back"	Julius Aguimatang	Alyssa Stratton	Troy Adomitis & James A. Little	September 15, 2025	301	0.18
49	1	"Meet the Aquabuds"	Kris Wimberly	Leanna Dindal	Aldin Baroza & James A. Little	September 15, 2025	301	0.18
Note: This is the first episode where Elisha "EJ" Williams voices Flash.
50	2	"Stuffy at Sea"	Julius Aguimatang	John N. Huss	Renee Camille Badua & Antony Mazzotta	September 16, 2025	302	0.18
50	2	"Drift Away"	Kris Wimberly	Jeremy Shipp	Angie Henderson & Marie Lum	September 16, 2025	302	0.18
51	3	"My Van Vinny"	Julius Aguimatang	Alyssa Stratton	Ed Raza & Jia "Kiara" Zhao	September 17, 2025	303	0.18
51	3	"Training Tower Tumult"	Kris Wimberly	Leanna Dindal	Cindy Quach & Ed Raza	September 17, 2025	303	0.18
52	4	"Mechanic Panic"	Julius Aguimatang	Alyssa Stratton	Julius Aguimatang & Renee Camille Badua	September 18, 2025	305	0.18
52	4	"2Fast2Fiery"	Kris Wimberly	Leanna Dindal	Steve Fonti & Angie Henderson	September 18, 2025	305	0.18
53	5	"Rainbow Island"	Julius Aguimatang & Kris Wimberly	John N. Huss & Jeremy Shipp	Cindy Quach, Ed Raza, & Jia "Kiara" Zhao	September 19, 2025	306	0.18
Note: This is the only half-hour episode of the series.
54	6	"You Can Rely on Ripley"	Julius Aguimatang	Alyssa Stratton	Troy Adomitis, James A. Little, & Antony Mazzotta	September 26, 2025	307	0.18
54	6	"Whale Worries"	Kris Wimberly	Leanna Dindal	Aldin Baroza & James A. Little	September 26, 2025	307	0.18
55	7	"Escape Garage"	Julius Aguimatang	John N. Huss	Troy Adomitis & James A. Little	October 1, 2025	304	N/A
55	7	"Halloween Hospital"	Kris Wimberly	Krystal Banzon	Aldin Baroza & James A. Little	October 1, 2025	304	N/A
Note: This is the last episode where Declan Whaley voices Bo.
56	8	"Flash Fire"	Julius Aguimatang	Alyssa Stratton	Ed Raza & Jia "Kiara" Zhao	October 10, 2025	309	N/A
56	8	"Trash Time"	Kris Wimberly	Krystal Banzon	Cindy Quach & Ed Raza	October 10, 2025	309	N/A
Note: This is the first episode where Yonas Kibreab voices Bo.
57	9	"Arty Party"	Julius Aguimatang	John N. Huss	Troy Adomitis & James A. Little	October 17, 2025	310	N/A
57	9	"Dog Gone Disaster"	Kris Wimberly	Jeremy Shipp	Aldin Baroza & James A. Little	October 17, 2025	310	N/A
58	10	"Father's Day Hoedown"	Julius Aguimatang	Alyssa Stratton	Renee Camille Badua, Steve Fonti, & Antony Mazzotta	October 24, 2025	311	N/A
58	10	"Big Brother BBQ"	Kris Wimberly	Matt Hoverman	Steve Fonti, Angie Henderson, & James A. Little	October 24, 2025	311	N/A
59	11	"Big Wave Day"	Julius Aguimatang	Alexandra Otto	Kaukab Basheer, Antony Mazzotta, Ed Raza, & Jia "Kiara" Zhao	October 31, 2025	312	N/A
59	11	"Sunken Duncan"	Kris Wimberly	John N. Huss	Ed Raza & Cindy Quach	October 31, 2025	312	N/A
60	12	"The Tag Along Turtle"	Julius Aguimatang	John N. Huss	Renee Camille Badua & Eugene Salandra	December 4, 2025	308	N/A
60	12	"Noche Buena Buds"	Kris Wimberly	Alexandra Otto	Steve Fonti & Angie Henderson	December 4, 2025	308	N/A

== Release ==
Firebuds premiered on Disney Jr. on September 21, 2022. It was later made available to stream on Disney+.

== Reception ==
=== Critical response ===
Alex Reif of Laughing Place asserted, "Firebuds teaches kids that the colorful vehicles with lights and sounds that enchant them on the roads have an important job to do. They can do their part by following the rules and playing safe. And when someone needs help, offer a hand if you're able. While the show isn't the first to tackle this same theme, it sets itself apart by including kids as both relatable humans and fun vehicles, and it is more reflective of the world we live in today to inspire the next generation of forward thinkers." Ashley Moulton of Common Sense Media gave the series a grade of three out of five stars, complimented the educational value, saying the series teaches responsibility, and praised the positive messages and role models, stating the characters demonstrate teamwork and friendliness.

=== Accolades ===
Firebuds received nominations for Outstanding Children's Programming at the 34th, 35th and 36th GLAAD Media Awards. Firebuds won the award at the 37th GLAAD Media Awards.

== In other media ==
=== Books ===
In June 2023, Disney Publishing Worldwide released a picture book inspired by the television series titled Firebuds: Meet the Firebuds. In September 2023, Disney Publishing Worldwide released a Christmas-themed picture book titled Firebuds: The Christmas Car-Sled Race.

=== Live show ===
In 2023, the characters from Firebuds appeared in the touring live-action arena show Disney Junior Live On Tour: Costume Palooza.
