= Matthew Lamb (actor) =

American actor (born 2012)

- Born: Matthew Lamb; August 26, 2012 (age 14); Iowa City, Iowa, U.S.
- Occupation: Actor
- Years active: 2020–present
- Website: www.matthew-lamb.com

Matthew Lamb (born August 26, 2012) is an American actor. He is best known for his work in television, including the role of Elliot Radvovic on the ABC crime series High Potential.

== Early life and education ==
Matthew was born in Iowa City, Iowa, the youngest of three children. His parents are Greg and Meredith Lamb. His sisters Regan and Alyssa are both part of professional ballet companies.

== Career ==
After performing in various roles in regional theater, Matthew has developed into a multi-talented performer in television, voice-acting, film and theater, and is now expanding his experience in to writing, directing and producing.

Matthew currently stars as Elliot Radovic in the popular ABC drama High Potential, alongside lead Kaitlin Olson.

He made his television debut playing a young Charles Haden-Savage, Steve Martin's character in Season Two of the Emmy Award-winning series Only Murders in the Building.

His film work, starting with psychological supernatural horror film Smile, has led to his first leading role in the upcoming film Going for Two, alongside Julianne Hough.

In theater, his most recent role was in New York City Center's production of Ragtime, following his performance alongside Tony winners Daniel Radcliffe, Jonathan Groff and Lindsay Mendez as Frank Jr. in the Off-Broadway production of Merrily We Roll Along at New York Theatre Workshop.

As a voice actor, he has voiced in Firebuds, Sofia the First: Royal Magic, Spidey and His Amazing Friends, Jentry Chau vs. the Underworld, and the PAW Patrol World video game.

== Filmography ==
Key
| † | Denotes works that have not yet been released |

=== Film ===
| Year | Title | Role | Notes |
|---|---|---|---|
| 2020 | My Sweet Holiday | Performer | Uncredited; TV Movie |
| 2022 | Smile | Jackson | |
| 2023 | Manodrome | Raymond | |
| 2024 | Your Monster | Benji | |
| 2024 | The Best Christmas Pageant Ever | Claude Herdman | |
| TBA | Going for Two | Jimmy | |

=== Television ===
| Year | Title | Role | Notes |
|---|---|---|---|
| 2022 | Only Murders in the Building | Young Charles-Haden Savage | Episode: "Framed" |
| 2023 | Spidey and His Amazing Friends | Andy (voice) | 1 episode |
| 2023-2025 | Firebuds | Harry (voice) | 5 episodes |
| 2024 | Jentry Chau vs. The Underworld | Young Billy (voice) | 1 episode |
| 2024–present | High Potential | Elliot Radovic | Series regular |
| 2026 | Sofia the First: Royal Magic | Devin (voice) | 6 episodes |

== Stage credits ==
| Year | Title | Role | Notes | Ref. |
|---|---|---|---|---|
| 2021 | A Christmas Story: The Musical | Randy Parker | Musical Theatre Kansas City | |
| 2021–2022 | Barnum | Tom Thumb | Musical Theatre Kansas City | |
| 2022 | School of Rock | Billy | The Theatre in the Park, Shawnee, KS | |
| 2022 | Freaky Friday | Fletcher | The New Theater & Restaurant, Overland Park, KS | |
| 2023 | Tommy and Me | Young Ray | Bucks County Playhouse | |
| 2023 | Merrily We Roll Along | Franklin Shepherd Jr. u/s | New York Theatre Workshop | |
| 2023–2024 | Ragtime | The Little Boy | Signature Theatre Company | |
| 2024 | Ragtime | The Little Boy | New York City Center | | |
