= Sofia the First: Royal Magic =

American animated fantasy television series

- Genre: Fantasy; Adventure; Comedy; Musical; Preschool
- Created by: Craig Gerber
- Developed by: Craig Gerber
- Voices of: Ariel Winter; Kai Harris; Aaliyah Magcasi; Mela Pietropaolo
- Theme music composer: John Kavanaugh; Craig Gerber
- Opening theme: "Sofia the First: Royal Magic Theme Song" by: Ariel Winter; Jenna Lea Rosen
- Ending theme: "Sofia the First: Royal Magic Theme Song" (instrumental)
- Composers: Keith Harrison Dworkin & John Kavanaugh (songs); Tony Morales (music)
- Country of origin: United States
- Original language: English
- No. of seasons: 1
- No. of episodes: 13

Production
- Executive producers: Craig Gerber; Krystal Banzon
- Producer: Craig Simpson
- Running time: 24 minutes
- Production companies: Electric Emu Productions (Note: Craig Gerber's production company); Disney Television Animation (Note: Animation outsourced to ICON Creative Studio Inc. (production and animation))

Original release
- Network: Disney Jr.
- Release: May 25, 2026 – present

Related
- Sofia the First; Elena of Avalor; Elena and the Secret of Avalor

Sofia the First: Royal Magic is an American animated musical fantasy children's television series created and developed by Craig Gerber. Serving as the sequel to Sofia the First, which originally aired from 2013 to 2018, the series premiered on Disney Jr. on May 25, 2026, and was released on Disney+ the following day. The series stars Ariel Winter reprising her role as Princess Sofia, alongside new cast members Kai Harris, Aaliyah Magcasi, and Mela Pietropaolo.

== Synopsis ==
Sofia the First: Royal Magic follows Sofia as she attends the Charmswell School for Royal Magic, where princes and princesses from across the Ever Realm continue their royal studies while learning different forms of magic. During her time at Charmswell, Sofia discovers she is the most magical princess in the realm and must learn how to master her powers while making new royal friends.

— The Walt Disney Company

== Voice cast and characters ==
=== Main ===
- Ariel Winter as Princess Sofia
- Kai Harris as Prince Zane
- Aaliyah Magcasi as Princess Camila
- Mela Pietropaolo as Princess Layla

=== Recurring ===
- Sara Ramirez as Queen Miranda
  - Andrea Rosa Guzman as Young Miranda
- Travis Willingham as King Roland II
- Darcy Rose Byrnes as Princess Amber
- Yonas Kibreab as Prince James
- Jess Harnell as Cedric the Sorcerer
- Wayne Brady as Clover
- Tim Gunn as Baileywick
- Eric Stonestreet as Minimus
- Isabella Acres as Jade
- Diamond White as Ruby Hanshaw
- Nate Torrence as Pepper
- Matthew Lamb as Prince Devin
- Eva Ariel Binder as Princess Zaria
- Julie Nathanson as Miss Nettle
- Beanie Feldstein as Wildfyre
- Yvette Nicole Brown as Lady Saddlespur
- James Monroe Iglehart as Lord Primrose
- Jeremy Swift as Mr. Muddykins
- Grey DeLisle as Miss Gigglesby
- Eden Espinosa as Zandrya
- Tony Hale as Mimsy Fizzlewick

=== Guest ===
- Ashley Eckstein as Mia
- Meghan Strange as Robin
- Isaac Robinson-Smith as Delwyn Dashing
- Merit Leighton as Lucinda
- Lauren Lapkus as Charmsie
- Kimiko Glenn as Trixie
- Ethan Slater as Nutmeg
- Jeremy Jordan as Sage
- Rachel Bloom as Queen Zora
- Nat Faxon as King Ziggy
- Belle Adams as Rapunzel
- Craig Gerber as Maximus
- Auliʻi Cravalho as Moana
- Aimee Carrero as Elena
- Cinderella
- Kate Higgins as Aurora
- Jasmine
- Susanne Blakeslee as Maleficent

== Episodes ==
Unlike the original series, each episode typically consists of two unrelated 11-minute segments.

No.	Title	Directed by	Written by	Storyboard by	Original release date	Prod. code
1	"Welcome to Charmswell"	Kris "Kris.W" Wimberly	Craig Gerber	Arielle Yett, Janice Seungmee Rim, Ashlyn Anstee, Cindy Quach & Eugene Salandra	May 25, 2026	101
Sofia begins her magical studies at the Charmswell School for Royal Magic, where she meets fellow students Prince Zane, Princess Camila, and Princess Layla, who will become her housemates; and Prince Devin, who will become her rival at the school. Princess Rapunzel later visits the school to warn her about possible new villains and reveals that Sofia's amulet is beginning to unlock new magical abilities.
2	"Abracadazzle"	Arielle Yett	Jeremy Shipp	Julius Aguimatang & Michelle Eloren	May 25, 2026	102
2	"Show and Spell"	Janice Seungmee Rim	Krystal Banzon	Renee Camille Badua & Michelle Eloren	May 25, 2026	102
After getting a very special wand from her idol Cedric, Sofia has to prove her skills at magic. Cedric becomes Sofia's sorcery teacher, while Layla was feeling bad about her lack of skills in magic.
3	"Give It a Twirl"	Janice Seungmee Rim	Isabel Galupo	Cat Harman-Mitchell & Kelsey Wooley	May 25, 2026	103
3	"The Tippity Tap Dance"	Arielle Yett	Walinase J. Mbekeani	Arturo A. Hernandez & Kelsey Wooley	May 25, 2026	103
While preparing for a parade, Sofia and Layla clash over who should be the leader of their baton twirling squad. After failed to learn a new dance, Zane decides to cheat and uses magic to save his reputation as a dancer.
4	"Magic Mayhem"	Janice Seungmee Rim	Jeremy Shipp	Eugene Salandra & Ashlyn Anstee	May 25, 2026	104
4	"Royal Mix It Up"	Arielle Yett	Francisco Paredes	Cindy Quach & Ashlyn Anstee	May 25, 2026	104
Trying to impress their top sorcerer idol Cedric, Sofia and Camila volunteer to clean after him, but Camila's over-eagerness cause trouble for both of them and poor Cedric himself. Despite of not having much in common, personality-wise, Sofia and Zane's little sister Princess Zaria tries to be friends for the sake of their common love for Zane.
5	"A Royal Family Picnic"	Arielle Yett	Isabel Galupo	Julius Aguimatang & Michelle Eloren	May 25, 2026	105
5	"The Royal Playdate"	Janice Seungmee Rim	Walinase J. Mbekeani	Renee Camille Badua & Michelle Eloren	May 25, 2026	105
Sofia's family decide to have a picnic, but her sister Princess Amber becomes jealous of Sofia's talent at magic. Sofia decides to introduce Layla to her family, and Layla was willing to do anything to impress them.
6	"New Horse on the Block"	Janice Seungmee Rim	Jeremy Shipp	Cat Harman-Mitchell & Kelsey Wooley	May 25, 2026	106
6	"The Green-Eyed Monster"	Arielle Yett	Francisco Paredes	Arturo A. Hernandez & Kelsey Wooley	May 25, 2026	106
Sofia joins the school's Flying Derby team, but due to the rules she has to replace Minimus with a new horse. Zane reveals that he's always been jealous of her little sister Zaria's success at everything, and brew a plan.
7	"Sleepy Time Spell"	Janice Seungmee Rim	Walinase J. Mbekeani	Eugene Salandra & Ashlyn Anstee	May 25, 2026	107
7	"Zane the Hero"	Arielle Yett	Isabel Galupo	Cindy Quach & Ashlyn Anstee	May 25, 2026	107
Sofia, Camila and Layla decide to have a girls only sleepover party at Sofia's home, but Layla becomes anxious over sleeping in Sofia's room. Zane becomes jealous of other students' heroic deeds, and decides to be a hero himself by defeating a dragon that was allegedly terrorizing the realm.
8	"Veggie Good Deed"	Janice Seungmee Rim	Jeremy Shipp	Renee Camille Badua & Michelle Eloren	May 25, 2026	108
8	"The Lilygnome"	Arielle Yett	Francisco Paredes	Julius Aguimatang & Michelle Eloren	May 25, 2026	108
Due to a school assignment, Princess Amber has to perform a good deed, but decides to cheat after facing the prospect of getting her hands dirty. Due to not following the instructions, Sofia creates a Lilygnome, and Layla has to help her.
9	"Crown Chaos"	Arielle Yett	Isabel Galupo	Arturo A. Hernandez & Kelsey Wooley	August 17, 2026	109
9	"Off to the Races"	Janice Seungmee Rim	Walinase J. Mbekeani	Cat Harman-Mitchell & Kelsey Wooley	August 17, 2026	109
Sofia and her housemates are given the responsibility of protecting a crown that makes its wearer the greatest sorcerer in the world. After learning from Rapunzel that an evil sorceress named Zandrya escaped from her captivity and seeks the crown, Sofia had to believe herself and bravely face this new threat. Sofia and her housemates have to compete in a flying horse relay race, but Camila is more interested in getting Mr. Cedric's approval by brewing a potion for him.
10	"When Clover Met Pepper"	Arielle Yett	Francisco Paredes	Cindy Quach, Ashlyn Anstee & Kelsey Wooley	August 18, 2026	110
10	"A Wand-erful Day"	Janice Seungmee Rim	Jeremy Shipp	Eugene Salandra, Ashlyn Anstee, Kelsey Wooley & Janice Seungmee Rim	August 18, 2026	110
Jealous of the new friendship between Sofia and Pepper, Clover decides to grow a horn upon his head. Prince James accidentally breaks Sofia's wand and decides to seek help from a suspicious man.
11	"Kidding Around"	Arielle Yett	Isabel Galupo	Julius Aguimatang & Michelle Eloren	August 19, 2026	111
11	"Puppercorn Ruckus"	Janice Seungmee Rim	Walinase J. Mbekeani	Renee Camille Badua & Michelle Eloren	August 19, 2026	111
Sofia's mother turns into a spoiled little kid due to a poorly thought-out wish made by Sofia. Puppercorns cause trouble all around the school while their caretaker Devin was abandoning his responsibilities.
12	"Hallow's Eve Hijinks"	Arielle Yett	Jeremy Shipp	Cindy Quach & Kelsey Wooley	October 2, 2026 (Note: This episode was first released on Disney+ on August 19, 2026.)	113
12	"Costume Clash"	Janice Seungmee Rim	Isabel Galupo	Eugene Salandra & Kelsey Wooley	October 2, 2026	113
Zane cheats on a All Hallows' Eve house decoration competition and frees a dangerous criminal goblin. Sofia's witch and sorceress friends, Lucinda and Camila, fight over her and about who's more magical.
13	"The Enchanted Lake"	Arielle Yett	Francisco Paredes	Arturo A. Hernandez & Ashlyn Anstee	November 6, 2026	112
13	"Tricky Trixie"	Janice Seungmee Rim	Sarah Eisenberg & Becky Wangberg	Cat Harman-Mitchell & Ashlyn Anstee	November 6, 2026	112
Zane loses Layla's very important drawing book on the lake, which causes her to lost her trust in him. A thief troll named Trixie steals Camila's very special wand and uses it for her criminal activities.
14	"Holiday at Charmswell"	TBA	TBA	TBA	November 26, 2026	115
15	"Zaria's New Mermaid to Charmswell"	N/A	N/A	N/A	December 21, 2026	114
15	"Princess Elena Returns"	N/A	N/A	N/A	December 21, 2026	114

== Magical Friends ==
No.	Title	Disney+ release date	YouTube/Disney Jr. release date
1	"Sofia and the Magical Castle Pets"	May 5, 2026	May 4, 2026
2	"Sofia and Layla's Magic Butterfly Wings"	May 5, 2026	May 4, 2026
3	"Magic Spells With Sofia and Clover"	May 5, 2026	May 11, 2026 (YouTube); May 4, 2026 (Disney Jr.)
4	"Magical Music With Sofia and Zane"	May 5, 2026	May 11, 2026 (YouTube); May 4, 2026 (Disney Jr.)
5	"Make a Rainbow Potion With Sofia and Camila"	May 5, 2026	May 18, 2026 (YouTube); May 4, 2026 (Disney Jr.)

== Production ==
In November 2022, Gerber reportedly expanded his development deal with Disney Branded Television, under which he began developing a Sofia the First spin-off centered on a royal academy for princes and princesses.

In August 2024, Disney Jr. announced that a sequel series titled Sofia the First: Royal Magic had been greenlit for a 2026 premiere.

In February 2026, the cast and May 2026 release window were announced, including the return of several cast members from the original series, such as Ariel Winter reprising her role as Sofia.

In March 2026, it was announced that Krystal Banzon would serve as co-executive producer and story editor, Kris "Kris.W" Wimberly as supervising director, Craig Simpson as producer, and Francis Giglio as art director.

In April 2026, additional cast members and the official premiere date were announced. It was also announced that Auliʻi Cravalho would reprise her role as Moana, alongside Aimee Carrero reprising her role as Elena.

Additional guest appearances by Rapunzel, Cinderella, Ariel, Aurora, and Jasmine were also confirmed.

== Release ==
The series premiered on Disney Jr. and Disney Jr. On Demand on May 25, 2026. The following day, the first eight episodes were released on Disney+ in the United States and select international territories. Prior to its release, Disney+ listed the series, along with others on the streaming service such as the original series and Elena of Avalor, as part of a guide of "fan-favorite" and nostalgic series for Millennial and Gen Z parents and their children to watch.

The series' soundtrack was released on May 29, 2026.

A short-form companion series titled Sofia the First: Magical Friends premiered on Disney YouTube channels prior to the television series and was released on Disney+ on May 5, 2026.

== See also ==
- Disney Princess
