= Joseph Haro =

American actor

- Born: Joseph Haro; May 29, 1987 (age 38); Miami, Florida, U.S.
- Occupation: Actor
- Years active: 2009–present

Joseph Haro (born May 29, 1987), also known as Joey Haro, is an American actor best known for playing Clark Stevenson on the MTV teen comedy Awkward and for voicing Mateo on Elena of Avalor. He was also a member of The Warblers on Glee.

== Early life and career ==
Haro was born in Miami to Cuban parents. He went to New World School of the Arts for high school, and then attended Florida State University, but left after his sophomore year to move to New York City to pursue an acting career.

In 2009 he appeared on Broadway as Chino in West Side Story, and was part of the ensemble cast of Hairspray and Altar Boyz. He played Hanschen in Deaf West Theatre's production of Spring Awakening in Los Angeles in 2014. From 2011 to 2013, he played Clark Stevenson on the TV series Awkward.

In 2013 he starred in the short-lived sitcom Welcome to the Family as Junior Hernandez. and appeared in one episode of Vegas.

He also appeared as Roger in a 2015 episode of Battle Creek. In 2016 he played Dallas in seven episodes of Still the King and played Paul in the film Summertime. In the 2019 he appeared in the film As You Like It, an adaptation of William Shakespeare's play of the same name, He had guest starring roles on Jessica Jones and This Close. His most prominent role in recent years is his voicing of Mateo in 44 episodes of Elena of Avalor, an animated series which ran from 2016 to 2020, and in the television film, Elena and the Secret of Avalor.

== Personal life ==
On October 11, 2020, on National Coming Out Day, Haro came out as gay in an Instagram post. Additionally, on June 29, 2020, at the end of LGBT Pride Month, Haro said in an Instagram post that "someday we'll find it[,] the rainbow connection[,] the lovers, the dreamers, and me" and wished people "Happy Pride."

== Filmography ==
Year	Work	Role	Notes
2011–2012	Glee	Warbler #1	4 episodes
2011–2013	Awkward	Clark Stevenson	9 episodes
2013	Vegas	Tony	1 episode
2013	Welcome to the Family	Junior Hernandez	12 episodes
2015	Battle Creek	Roger	1 episode
2016-2020	Elena of Avalor	Mateo (voice)	44 episodes
2016	Elena and the Secret of Avalor	Mateo (voice)	Television film
2016	Still the King	Dallas	7 episodes
2016	Summertime	Paul	Movie
2019	As You Like It	Celia / Aliena	Movie
2019	Jessica Jones	Waiter	1 episode
2019	This Close	Noah	2 episodes
