= John Kavanaugh =

American composer, lyricist and musical director

John William Kavanaugh
- John W. Kavanaugh
- Born: Norfolk, Virginia, U.S.
- Education: Rollins College
- Occupation: Composer/Lyricist
- Website: johnkavanaugh.net

John William Kavanaugh is an American composer, lyricist and musical director who is currently serving as one of several songwriters on Sofia the First: Royal Magic for Disney Television Animation. He is the recipient of 9 Emmy nominations and was awarded the 2014 Daytime Emmy Award for Sofia The First Main Title theme song with co-lyricist Craig Gerber. While working on Sofia The First, Kavanaugh was tapped to write songs for Disney's first Latina princess, the award-winning Elena of Avalor. Kavanaugh penned the songs and served as music director on the series Alice's Wonderland Bakery which premiered in February of 2022. In 2023, he earned an Emmy nomination for Outstanding Original Song for "The Hat Makes The Hatter," co-written with lyricists Chelsea Beyl and Marisa Evans-Sanden, and the trio repeated their success in December 2024 with another nomination for "Let Your Wish Carry You Away" from season two.

Kavanaugh has also written several songs for Disney Channel’s live-action series Vampirina: Teenage Vampire, including season one’s "Maybe I'm Falling," with lyrics by David Goldsmith. His songs can be heard in several hit movies, including Disney's Descendants 3 (My Once Upon a Time), Winnie The Pooh film Springtime with Roo and Nickelodeon's Globehunters. He co-wrote the scores to Curious George Live for NBC Universal, Dreams are Universal for Universal Studios Japan, Flintstones: The Musical for Universal Studios Hollywood, as well as numerous songs for Sesame Street Live and Tokyo DisneySea. With lyricist Marcy Heisler, Kavanaugh wrote the song "Joseph's Lullaby" for Michael Crawford which appears on his 1998 album On Eagle's Wings.

== Personal life ==
John William Kavanaugh is the son of Edward Houston Kavanaugh and Eileen Kirby Gunn and is the youngest of six children. He grew up in Norfolk, Virginia and developed his passion for music by watching his mother play the piano and create/direct many variety shows in Norfolk. Kavanaugh graduated from Rollins College in Winter Park, Florida and began working at Disney World in 1983. He then moved to Los Angeles in 1986 to work for Disneyland where he soon began his composing career writing for theatre, theme parks worldwide and eventually for television.

He has been partnered with Efren Gonzalez since 1989 and married (once it was legal) since 2014. John and Efren reside in Los Angeles and Palm Springs, California.

== Awards ==
Year	Award	Song	Category/Award	Shared with	Result
2024	Children's & Family Emmy Awards	"Let Your Wish Carry You Away" "Alice's Wonderland Bakery: Hattie Wishes Upon A Star"	Outstanding Original Song for a Preschool Program	Marisa Evans-Sanden and Chelsea Beyl	Nominated
2023	Children's & Family Emmy Awards	"The Hat Makes The Hatter" "Alice's Wonderland Bakery: It's the Hatter that Matters"	Outstanding Original Song for a Preschool Program	Marisa Evans-Sanden and Chelsea Beyl	Nominated
2021	Daytime Emmy Awards	"Something In The Air" "Elena of Avalor: Sweetheart's Day"	Outstanding Original Song in a Preschool, Children's or Animated Program	Rachel Ruderman and Craig Gerber	Nominated
2020	Daytime Emmy Awards	"Never Leave", "Elena of Avalor: Movin' on Up"	Outstanding Original Song in a Children's, Young Adult or Animated Program	Jeffrey M. Howard and Craig Gerber	Nominated
2019	Daytime Emmy Awards	"For One And All", "Sofia the First: Forever Royal"	Outstanding Original Song in a Children's or Animated Program	Craig Gerber	Nominated
2019	Daytime Emmy Awards	"Fallin' Like a Rock", "Elena of Avalor: A Lava Story"	Outstanding Original Song in a Children's or Animated Program	Craig Gerber, Silvia Olivas and Kerri Grant	Nominated
2019	Kidscreen Awards	Elena of Avalor	Creative Talent Award/Best Music	Tony Morales, Craig Gerber	Won
2019	Annie Awards	Elena of Avalor	Outstanding Achievement in Music in an Animated TV/Broadcast Production	Tony Morales, Craig Gerber, Rachel Ruderman and Silvia Olivas	Nominated
2015	ASCAP Film And Television Awards	Sofia the First	2014 Top Television Series, Composer		Won
2014	Primetime Emmy Awards	"Merroway Cove", "Sofia the First: The Floating Palace"	Outstanding Original Music and Lyrics	Craig Gerber	Nominated
2014	Daytime Emmy Awards	"Sofia the First: Main Title Theme"	Outstanding Original Song - Main Title and Promo	Craig Gerber	Won
2014	Daytime Emmy Awards	"I Belong", "Sofia the First: The Princess Test"	Outstanding Original Song	Craig Gerber	Nominated
2014	Annie Awards	Sofia the First	Outstanding Achievement in Music in an Animated TV/Broadcast Production	Kevin Kliesch and Craig Gerber	Nominated
2014	ASCAP Film And Television Awards	Sofia the First	2013 Top Television Series, Composer		Won

== Articles ==
http://www.orlandosentinel.com/entertainment/tv/tv-guy/os-disney-composer-serves-two-heroines-20161205-story.html
