= List of Elena of Avalor episodes =

Episodes of American animated television series

Elena of Avalor is an American animated television series that premiered on Disney Channel on July 22, 2016, and moved to Disney Junior on July 14, 2018. The series features Aimee Carrero as the voice of Elena, a teenage Latina princess.

The series finale aired on August 23, 2020.

== Series overview ==
Season	Episodes	Originally released	
Season	Episodes	First released	Last released
1	25	July 22, 2016	October 1, 2017
2	24	October 14, 2017	June 1, 2019
3	28	October 7, 2019	August 23, 2020

== Episodes ==
=== Season 1 (2016–17) ===
No. overall	No. in season	Title	Directed by	Written by	Storyboard by	Original release date	Prod. code	U.S. viewers (millions)
1	1	"First Day of Rule"	Elliot M. Bour and Jamie Mitchell; Barbara Dourmaskin-Case, Connor Flynn and Woody Yocum (timing)	Craig Gerber	Nathan Chew, Robb Pratt, John Ramirez, Aldina Dias, John Pomeroy, Hank Tucker and Eugene Salandra	July 22, 2016	101	2.22
Elena becomes Crown Princess and has to rescue Isabel, her sister, from a ship that went missing. Guest stars: Lucas Grabeel as Jiku, Constance Marie as Doña Paloma, Rich Sommer as Captain Turner Song: "Ready to Rule", sung by Elena and Francisco Notes: The events of this episode chronologically take place after Elena and the Secret of Avalor.
2	2	"Model Sister"	Elliot M. Bour; Barbara Dourmaskin-Case (timing)	Becca Topol	Aldin Baroza, Bryan Baugh, Lynell H. Forestall and John Ramirez	July 22, 2016	102	2.22
Elena tries to prove her commitment as Crown Princess and to her sister, duties which pull her in opposite directions. Guest stars: Mikey Kelley as Higgins, James Sie as Shoji, George Takei as King Toshi of Satu Song: "Sister Time", sung by Elena and Isabel
3	3	"All Heated Up"	Elliot M. Bour; Barbara Dourmaskin-Case (timing)	Tom Rogers	Julius Aguimatang, Tom Morgan, Scotland D. Barnes and Chris Headrick	July 29, 2016	103	1.23
Elena disagrees with the Grand Council when faced with the magical monster who can make a volcano erupt. Guest stars: Emil Bastien Boufford as Damon, Tituss Burgess as Charoca, Mckenna Grace as Bella, Grey Griffin as Damon's Mother Song: "Blow My Top", sung by Charoca and Elena
4	4	"Island of Youth"	Nathan Chew; Barbara Dourmaskin-Case (timing)	Becca Topol	Bryan Baugh, Lynell H. Forestall and John Ramirez	August 12, 2016	104	1.73
Elena and Mateo work together to save Esteban from disappearing up his own existence after he drinks too much water from a magical spring. Guest stars: Anthony Avila as Young Esteban, Desmond Gerber as Baby Esteban, Mikey Kelley as Higgins Songs: "Avalorian Lullaby", sung by Elena, "Avalor Birthday Song", sung by Isabel and Francisco
5	5	"Spellbound"	Robb Pratt; Barbara Dourmaskin-Case (timing)	Tom Rogers	Robb Pratt, Aldin Baroza and David Williams; Kevin Slawinski (additional)	August 26, 2016	105	1.26
Fiero, an evil wizard, enters the royal palace, turning the royal court into stone. Elena has to rely upon the untested royal wizard, Mateo, to save the day. Guest stars: Héctor Elizondo as Fiero, Ana Ortiz as Rafa Song: "The Magic Within You", sung by Elena
6	6	"Prince Too Charming"	Nathan Chew; Barbara Dourmaskin-Case (timing)	Mercedes Valle	Lynell Forestall, Bryan Baugh, John Ramirez and Alan Caldwell; Robert Souza (additional)	September 16, 2016	107	1.14
Elena meets an annoying, brash, and spoiled prince, Alonso, in a nearby kingdom, and is convinced to take a break from being a ruler. Guest stars: Tyler Posey as Prince Alonso, Anthony Mendez as King Juan Ramón, Jason LaShea as Yacalli Song: "Feel Free to Have Fun", sung by Elena and Prince Alonso
7	7	"Finders Leapers"	Nathan Chew; Barbara Dourmaskin-Case (timing)	Silvia Olivas	Julius Aguimatang, Scotland D. Barnes, Thomas Morgan and Chris Headrick	September 23, 2016	106	1.43
Esteban claims that Naomi is not worthy to sit on the Grand Council, so she tries to prove him wrong. Guest stars: Dee Bradley Baker as Duendes, Grey Griffin as Professor Mendoza, Rich Sommer as Captain Turner Song: "Something Special", sung by Naomi
8	8	"Royal Retreat"	Robb Pratt; Barbara Dourmaskin-Case (timing)	Becca Topol	Gavin Dell, Zane Yarbrough, Eddie Lin, Alan Caldwell and Celia Kendrick	September 30, 2016	108	1.23
Attending her first Royal Retreat, Elena strongly disagrees with the pompus King Hector who wants to capture sea creatures for his personal aquarium and has values diametrically opposed to the ones Elena holds. Guest stars: Jess Harnell as King Hector, Jeff Bennett as King Lars, Echo Kellum as King Joaquín, Aasif Mandvi as King Raja Song: "To Be In My Club", sung by King Hector
9	9	"A Day to Remember"	Elliot M. Bour; Barbara Dourmaskin-Case (timing)	Silvia Olivas	Gavin Dell, Eddie Lin and Zane Yarbrough	October 16, 2016	109	1.38
Elena, while celebrating Dia de los Muertos, helps two siblings keep their restaurant and reconnect with their long-lost grandmother. Guest stars: Jaime Camil as Julio, Ivonne Coll as Doña Angelica, Justina Machado as Carmen Song: "Festival of Love", sung by Elena
10	10	"The Scepter of Light"	Robb Pratt; Barbara Dourmaskin-Case (timing)	S : Tom Rogers; T : Mercedes Valle	Aldin Baroza, Lenord Robinson, Arielle Yett and Wendy Grieb	November 4, 2016	110	1.20
Elena learns that her magical scepter draws from the magic within her. She then attempts to stop an evil moth fairy, Orizaba, who wishes to shroud the world in eternal darkness, even if it puts her life on the line. Guest star: Eden Espinosa as Orizaba Song: "The Gift of Night", sung by Orizaba
11	11	"Navidad"	Nathan Chew; Barbara Dourmaskin-Case (timing)	Craig Gerber	John Ramirez, Bryan Baugh, Lynell H. Forestall and Robert Souza	December 9, 2016	111	1.71
Elena attempts to bring together those across Avalor to share their traditions and remind them of what the holidays are really about. Guest stars: Jaime Camil as Julio, Montse Hernandez as Cristina, Justina Machado as Carmen, Constance Marie as Doña Paloma, Gaby Moreno as Marlena, Gabriel Oliva as Fernando, Ana Ortiz as Rafa, Rich Sommer as Captain Turner Songs: "The Way We Do Navidad", sung by Marlena, Naomi, Julio, and Cristina, "Hacia Belén Va Una Burra Rin Rin", sung by Marlena, "Let Love Light the Way", sung by Elena, Gabe, and the Avalorans
12	12	"Olaball"	Nathan Chew	Tom Rogers	Julius Aguimatang, Scotland D. Barnes and Byron Peñaranda	February 25, 2017	114	1.76
The Peace Festival returns to Avalor as does an Olaball tournament. When Avalor's main player is injured, Gabe attempts to take his place, with mixed results. Elena tries to teach him the skills he needs, so Avalor can win against the skilled team from Cariza. Guest stars: Artt Butler as Roberto Núñez, Alejandra Gollas as Blanca Núñez, Echo Kellum as King Joaquín, Marsai Martin as Princess Caterina, Arturo Del Puerto as Rico, Sam Riegel as Referee Song: "Play It Your Way", sung by Gabe and Elena
13	13	"Flight of the Jaquins"	Robb Pratt	Becca Topol	Gavin Dell, Eddie Lin and Zane Yarbrough	March 4, 2017	115	1.49
Skylar is chosen as a guide to three jaquins from another realm to prepare them to fight against evil. But when his brother comes into the picture, his playful nature puts them all in danger. Guest stars: Grant George as Troyo, Lucas Grabeel as Jiku, Jess Harnell as Chief Zephyr, Lincoln Melcher as Avión, Jenna Lea Rosen as Ciela, Wilber Zaldivar as Nico Song: "The Bros Are Back", sung by Skylar and Nico
14	14	"Crystal in the Rough"	Nathan Chew	Mercedes Valle	Bryan C. Baugh, Alan R. Caldwell, Lynell H. Forestall and John E. Ramirez	March 11, 2017	112	1.82
Isabel starts her first day of school since she was freed from the painting. When the other kids at school dislike her, she decides to make herself different, so she can be accepted by everyone else. Guest stars: Odette Annable as Señorita Marisol, Kyle Arem as Quique, Zoe Hendrix as Amara Song: "Fix Anything", sung by Elena and Isabel
15	15	"The Princess Knight"	Nathan Chew	Becca Topol	Julius Aguimatang, Scotland D. Barnes and Byron Peñaranda	March 18, 2017	113	1.45
After Elena's grandfather advises her not to compete in an upcoming fencing tournament, fearing she will get hurt, she decides to prove him wrong, disguising herself as a "Knight Elezar". Guest stars: Keith Ferguson as Sir Cassius, Bob Joles as Lord Elrod, Sam Riegel as Referee Song: "Steppin' Up", sung by Elena
16	16	"Captain Turner Returns"	Nathan Chew	Kaita Mpambara	Julius Aguimatang, Scotland D. Barnes; Alan Caldwell and Byron Peñaranda	April 8, 2017	117	1.44
Naomi is excited that her mom, Scarlett, has returned, but is distraught when she learns that she is returning to Norberg, and that the whole family is leaving Avalor. She and Elena try to persuade Scarlett to stay in Avalor by any means necessary. Guest stars: Jeff Bennett as Felipe, Constance Marie as Doña Paloma, Julie Nathanson as Scarlett Turner, Rich Sommer as Captain Turner Song: "Home for Good", sung by Naomi and Elena
17	17	"King of the Carnaval"	Robb Pratt	Tom Rogers	Aldin Baroza, Lenord Robinson and Arielle Yett	April 22, 2017	116	1.50
When Victor, an old ally of Esteban, attempts to steal the crown jewels, Esteban has to choose whether he will protect Elena or his past collaboration with the evil sorceress who killed Elena's parents, Shuriki. Guest stars: Mikey Kelley as Higgins, Lou Diamond Phillips as Victor Delgado, Myrna Velasco as Carla Delgado Song: "Something I Would Never Do", sung by Esteban
18	18	"My Fair Naomi"	Robb Pratt	Maria Escobedo	Aldin Baroza, Lenord Robinson, Robb Pratt and Arielle Yett	May 6, 2017	119	1.23
Naomi quickly becomes self-absorbed after Elena tries to throw a Royal Quinceañera for her. Guest stars: Mikey Kelley as Higgins, Ruth Livier as Countess Delores, Constance Marie as Doña Paloma, Alma Martinez as Lady Yolanda Song: "The Bright Light of the Ball", sung by Naomi and Esteban
19	19	"Spirit Monkey Business"	Nathan Chew	Tom Rogers	Julius Aguimatang, Bryan Baugh, Lynell H. Forestall and John Ramirez	June 30, 2017	118	1.10
After a spirit monkey brings Mateo into the spirit world, Elena, with the help of Zuzo, has to save him. Guest stars: Richard Kind as Cacahuate, Max Mittelman as Bobo Song: "Your Spirit Guide", sung by Zuzo
20	20	"Wizard-in-Training"	Robb Pratt	Becca Topol	Alan Caldwell, Gavin Dell, Eddie Lin and Robert Souza	July 21, 2017	122	1.19
Mateo excitedly takes on a young girl as a magician's apprentice, but the job ends up being more challenging than he anticipated. Guest stars: Emil Bastien Bouffard as Lucas, Grey Griffin as Gabriela, Robert Pine as Octavio, Fred Tatasciore as Water Spirit, Kitana Turnbull as Olivia, Mick Wingert as Alex Song: "Cast a Spell With Me", sung by Mateo and Olivia
21	21	"Realm of the Jaquins"	Elliot M. Bour	Silvia Olivas and Craig Gerber	Aldin Baroza, Gavin Dell, John Ramirez, Scotland Barnes, Lynell Forestall and Robert Souza	August 12, 2017	120–121	1.38
Elena travels to the jaquin realm and accidentally lets out a forest spirit which puts all of Avalor in danger. Guest stars: Jane Fonda as Shuriki, Jess Harnell as Chief Zephyr, Cheech Marin as Quita Moz, Lincoln Melcher as Avión, Lou Diamond Phillips as Victor Delgado, Jenna Lea Rosen as Ciela, André Sogliuzzo as King Verago, Myrna Velasco as Carla Delgado, Noël Wells as Marimonda, Wilber Zaldivar as Nico Songs: "Got It Down", sung by Elena, "A Big Deal", sung by King Verago, "You Can't Catch Me", sung by Marimonda
22	22	"The Gecko's Tale"	Robb Pratt	Kaita Mpambara	Gavin Dell, Eddie Lin and Robert Souza	August 18, 2017	123	0.91
Elena and Isabel are forced to put their disagreements aside, so they can help undo a curse. Guest stars: Dee Bradley Baker as Gecko, Danny Trejo as Antonio Agama
23	23	"Party of a Lifetime"	Robb Pratt	Mercedes Valle	Aldin Baroza, Wendy Grieb, Lenord Robinson and Arielle Yett	August 25, 2017	125	0.85
An enchanted ship rescues Elena and her friends after they become stranded, but not all is what it seems. Guest stars: Khary Payton as Captain Chiloya, Kari Wahlgren as Bijoux Song: "Forever", sung by Captain Chiloya and his crew
24	24	"Blockheads"	Robb Pratt	Tom Rogers	Aldin Baroza, Robb Pratt, Lenord Robinson and Arielle Yett	September 16, 2017	126	0.93
Isabel works to undo a magic spell which turned Elena and her friends into moving sculptures. Guest star: Mikey Kelley as Higgins Song: "It's Up to Us", sung by Armando and Higgins
25	25	"Masks of Magic"	Nathan Chew	Kaita Mpambara	Julius Aguimatang, Scotland D. Barnes, Alan Caldwell and Byron Peñaranda	October 1, 2017	124	1.08
Elena and Doña Paloma work together to save visiting dignitaries from a magical spell. Guest stars: Trevor Devall as Nathaniel, Constance Marie as Doña Paloma, Rene Mujica as Pablo Agama, Tyler Posey as Prince Alonso, James Sie as Shoji Song: "Best for Our Guests", sung by Elena and Doña Paloma

=== Season 2 (2017–19) ===
No. overall	No. in season	Title	Directed by	Written by	Storyboard by	Original release date	Prod. code	U.S. viewers (millions)
26	1	"The Jewel of Maru"	Robb Pratt	Ron Holsey	Scotland D. Barnes, Robb Pratt, Fred Reyes and Robert Souza	October 14, 2017	201	1.18
Elena attempts to stop evildoers Carla and Victor from taking a powerful jewel and using it for their own devious ends. Guest stars: Nestor Carbonell as King Raul, Jane Fonda as Shuriki, Andrea Navedo as Queen Lucia, Lou Diamond Phillips as Victor Delgado, Genesis Rodriguez as Amaláy, Myrna Velasco as Carla Delgado Song: "Make Them Proud", sung by Elena
27	2	"Royal Rivalry"	Nathan Chew	Tom Rogers	Julius Aguimatang, Casey Lowe and Arielle Yett	October 28, 2017	202	1.26
Elena and another princess, Valentina, become competitive as she tries to improve relations with another country. Guest stars: Chrissie Fit as Princess Valentina, Jane Fonda as Shuriki, Lou Diamond Phillips as Victor Delgado, Myrna Velasco as Carla Delgado Songs: "Welcome to Avalor", sung by Francisco, "A Little Bit More", sung by Princess Valentina
28	3	"The Curse of El Guapo"	Robb Pratt	Silvia Olivas	Aldin Baroza, Gavin Dell, Byron Peñaranda and Robb Pratt	November 11, 2017	203	1.11
After borrowing a magic sword, Gabe is cursed. Guest stars: Joe Camareno as Captain Sandoval, David DeSantos as El Guapo, Grey Griffin as Professor Mendoza, Arturo Del Puerto as Rico Song: "The Captain of the Guard", sung by Gabe
29	4	"Three Jaquins and a Princess"	Nathan Chew	Don Perez	Scotland D. Barnes, Fred Reyes and Robert Souza	November 18, 2017	204	1.07
Isabel tries to take care of the three baby jaquins without any help, but when they escape, she has to return them to the palace before their parents come back. Guest stars: Jaime Camil as Julio, Desmond Gerber as Mingo, Gia Lopez as Estrella, Justina Machado as Carmen, Constance Marie as Doña Paloma, Alma Martinez as Lady Yolanda, Rosie Perez as Dulce, Maximus Riegel as Zoom Song: "I Am Grown Up Enough", sung by Isabel
30	5	"A Spy in the Palace"	Robb Pratt	Rachel Ruderman	Julius Aguimatang, Casey Lowe and Arielle Yett	November 25, 2017	205	1.07
In an attempt to steal the tiara of Elena's mother, Carla sneaks into the royal palace in disguise as Armando's cousin, Rita Perez. But not everything goes as planned when Elena befriends "Rita" and accuses Naomi of being jealous of their friendship. Guest stars: Jane Fonda as Shuriki, Desmond Gerber as Mingo, Gia Lopez as Estrella, Lou Diamond Phillips as Victor Delgado, Arturo Del Puerto as Rico, Maximus Riegel as Zoom, Myrna Velasco as Carla Delgado Song: "Don’t Look Now", sung by Victor and Carla
31	6	"Science Unfair"	Nathan Chew	Tom Rogers	Aldin Baroza, Gavin Dell and Byron Peñaranda	February 24, 2018	206	0.99
Excitedly, Isabel enters the local science fair, but ignores the advice of her sister when she tries to finish the project without help from her friends. Meanwhile, Carla, still in disguise as Rita, tries to break into the treasury by convincing Mateo.: This episode first debuted on Disney Channel in the UK and Ireland on February 10, 2018 before its official US debut 2 weeks later.; Guest stars: Odette Annable as Señorita Marisol, Kyle Arem as Quique, Jane Fonda as Shuriki, Zoe Hendrix as Amara, Montse Hernandez as Cristina, Josh Keaton as Miguel, Lou Diamond Phillips as Victor Delgado, Robert Pine as Octavio, Carla Tassara as Professor Ochoa, Myrna Velasco as Carla Delgado Song: "Hand in Hand", sung by Elena and Isabel
32	7	"Rise of the Sorceress"	Robb Pratt	Don Perez	Scotland D. Barnes, Fred Reyes and Robert Souza	March 3, 2018	207	0.99
As Avalor prepares for the Sunflower Festival, Naomi attempts to warn Elena that Carla, who is disguised as Rita, is a danger. Guest stars: Jaime Camil as Julio, Héctor Elizondo as Fiero, Jane Fonda as Shuriki, Montse Hernandez as Cristina, Gaby Moreno as Marlena, Gabriel Oliva as Fernando, Lou Diamond Phillips as Victor Delgado, Myrna Velasco as Carla Delgado Song: "This New Day", sung by Elena, Isabel and Luisa
33	8	"Shapeshifters"	Nathan Chew	Laurie Israel	Julius Aguimatang, Casey Lowe and Arielle Yett; Steven Umbleby (additional)	March 10, 2018	208	0.89
In an attempt to find Shuriki, after a Grand Council vote not to her liking, Elena changes into a jaquin, but is then accused of a crime even though she is innocent. Guest stars: Desmond Gerber as Mingo, Jess Harnell as Chief Zephyr, Gia Lopez as Estrella, Mario Lopez as Cruz, Maximus Riegel as Zoom Song: "The Right Thing to Do", sung by Elena and Esteban
34	9	"The Scepter of Night"	Robb Pratt	Tom Rogers	Aldin Baroza, Gavin Dell, Byron Peñaranda and Robb Pratt; Cole Harrington (additional)	March 17, 2018	209	0.78
Elena and her friends attempt to get the first piece of an evil counterpart to the scepter of light before it is too late. Guest stars: Héctor Elizondo as Fiero, Jane Fonda as Shuriki, Rosie Perez as Dulce, Lou Diamond Phillips as Victor Delgado, Myrna Velasco as Carla Delgado Song: "Wisest Wizard in the World", sung by Mateo
35	10	"The Race for the Realm"	Nathan Chew	Rachel Ruderman	Scotland D. Barnes, Fred Reyes and Robert Souza; Cole Harrington and Steven Umbleby (additionals)	July 14, 2018	210	0.66
Elena attempts to find more pieces of the evil scepter before Shuriki can use it. Guest stars: Héctor Elizondo as Fiero, Jane Fonda as Shuriki, Grant George as Troyo, Diane Guerrero as Vestia, Mario Lopez as Cruz, Cheech Marin as Quita Moz, Vargus Mason as Zuni, Rosie Perez as Dulce, Lou Diamond Phillips as Victor Delgado, Mick Wingert as Lomo and Bruce, Myrna Velasco as Carla Delgado, Katherine Von Till as Maya Song: "If You Just Keep Moving On", sung by the Flaringos, Elena and Naomi
36	11	"A Tale of Two Scepters"	Robb Pratt	S : Tom Rogers and Rachel Ruderman; T : Don Perez	Julius Aguimatang, Casey Lowe, Robb Pratt and Arielle Yett; Cole Harrington (additional)	July 21, 2018	211	0.71
Elena goes to the jaquin realm, hoping to master her scepter, but is drawn back to Avalor when Shuriki returns. Guest stars: Héctor Elizondo as Fiero, Jane Fonda as Shuriki, Grant George as Troyo, Whoopi Goldberg as Lama, Diane Guerrero as Vestia, Cloris Leachman as Hool, Mario Lopez as Cruz, Cheech Marin as Quita Moz, Lou Diamond Phillips as Victor Delgado, Tony Plana as Qapa, Myrna Velasco as Carla Delgado Song: "Only One Will Remain", sung by Quita Moz, Lama, Hool, and Qapa
37	12	"Class Act"	Nathan Chew	Kerri Grant	Aldin Baroza, Francis Glebas and Gavin Dell; Cole Harrington (additional)	July 28, 2018	212	0.79
Isabel begins taking classes at the Avalor Science Academy, with her first one with Professor Ochoa, a scientist she admires. Guest stars: Kimiko Glenn as Tomiko, Raffael Ponce-Valencia as Javier, Carla Tassara as Professor Ochoa Song: "Welcome to the Future", sung by Professor Ochoa
38	13	"All Kingdoms Fair"	Robb Pratt	Tom Rogers	Scotland D. Barnes, Fred Reyes and Robert Souza; Cole Harrington (additional)	August 4, 2018	213	0.61
Armando is tasked with organizing the All Kingdoms Fair in an attempt to give him more self-confidence. Guest stars: Artt Butler as Roberto Núñez, Jaime Camil as Julio, Justina Machado as Carmen, Constance Marie as Doña Paloma, Horatio Sanz as Santos Gutierrez, Vanessa Richardson as Rosario Gutierrez, Mick Wingert as Martin Song: "Armando", sung by Elena and Naomi
39	14	"A Lava Story"	Robb Pratt	Kerri Grant	Aldin Baroza, Gavin Dell and Francis Glebas; Cole Harrington (additional)	August 11, 2018	214	0.68
Elena again helps Charoca, his time after he meets a female rock monster. Guest stars: Emil Bastien Boufford as Damon, Danielle Brooks as Charica, Tituss Burgess as Charoca, Mckenna Grace as Bella, Tyler Posey as Prince Alonso, Anthony Mendez as King Juan Ramón Song: "Fallin' Like a Rock", sung by Charoca and Charica
40	15	"Song of the Sirenas"	Elliot M. Bour	Silvia Olivas and Rachel Ruderman	Julius Aguimatang, Scotland D. Barnes, Cole Harrington, Casey Lowe, Robert Souza, Fred Reyes and Arielle Yett	September 21, 2018	216–217 (226)	0.62
Elena visits Duke Cristóbal, her cousin, and befriends sea creatures known as sirenas, hoping they will help her defeat Shuriki. Guest stars: Rosario Dawson as Daria, Héctor Elizondo as Fiero, Jane Fonda as Shuriki, Diane Guerrero as Vestia, Gia Lopez as Young Princess Marisa, Mario Lopez as Cruz, Rita Moreno as Queen Camila, Javier Muñoz as Duke Cristóbal, Julie Nathanson as Scarlett Turner, Edward James Olmos as King Pescoro, Lou Diamond Phillips as Victor Delgado, Gina Rodriguez as Princess Marisa, Prince Royce as Prince Marzel, Richard Horvitz as Ocho, Rich Sommer as Captain Turner, Myrna Velasco as Carla Delgado, Travis Willingham as Cuco Songs: "Familia Forever", sung by Duke Cristóbal, Elena, and her family and friends, "A New Tale", sung by Princess Marisa, "Our Chance", sung by Elena and Princess Marisa
41	16	"The Tides of Change"	Nathan Chew	Don Perez	Aldin Baroza, Gavin Dell and Francis Glebas; Cole Harrington and James A. Little (additionals)	October 13, 2018	218	0.67
As Elena tries to get a treaty between humans and sirenas signed, one commander tries to prove to sirenas that humans still don't trust them by employing evil dolphins, hoping it will scuttle the treaty negotiations. Guest stars: Steve Buscemi as Saloso, Rosario Dawson as Daria, Ralph Garman as Torpe, Richard Horvitz as Ocho, Rita Moreno as Queen Camila, Edward James Olmos as King Pescoro, Gina Rodriguez as Princess Marisa, Prince Royce as Prince Marzel, Travis Willingham as Cuco Song: "The Art of the Steal", sung by Saloso and the Malandros
42	17	"The Return of El Capitan"	Nathan Chew	Rachel Ruderman	Scotland D. Barnes, Fred Reyes and Robert Souza; Cole Harrington (additional)	October 27, 2018	222	0.84
Elena works with her grandfather to complete a task he began many years before. Guest stars: Jorge R. Gutiérrez as El Guerrero, Rob Paulsen as Macoco, Freddy Rodriguez as El Místico, Prince Royce as Prince Marzel Song: "The Legend of Los Tres", sung by Francisco, El Guerrero and El Místico
43	18	"Finding Zuzo"	Nathan Chew	Tom Rogers	Julius Aguimatang, Casey Lowe and Arielle Yett; Cole Harrington (additional)	November 3, 2018	215	0.76
Elena attempts to get other spirit guides to help her when Zuzo goes missing. Guest stars: Eden Espinosa as Orizaba, Richard Kind as Cacahuate, Max Mittelman as Bobo Song: "Top Banana King", sung by Bobo, Elena and the Zanies
44	19	"Snow Place Like Home"	Robb Pratt	Tom Rogers	Cole Harrington (additional)	November 24, 2018	221	0.65
When a snowstorm threatens Elena's plans to have a quiet holiday, she tries to keep everything together. Guest stars: Diane Guerrero as Vestia, Josh Keaton as Miguel and Andres, Mario Lopez as Cruz, Lou Diamond Phillips as Victor Delgado, Myrna Velasco as Carla Delgado Songs: "Home for Navidad", sung by Elena, "Hearts Full of Cheer", sung by Elena, and her family and friends
45	20	"Two Left Fins"	Robb Pratt	S : Tom Rogers and Rachel Ruderman; T : Michael Kramer	Scott Barnes, Cole Harrington, Fred Reyes and Robert Souza	January 19, 2019	219	0.70
Prince Marzel, in an attempt to impress visiting kings, accidentally turns them into sirenas. Guest stars: Jeff Bennett as King Lars, Richard Horvitz as Ocho, Echo Kellum as King Joaquín, Aasif Mandvi as King Raja, Edward James Olmos as King Pescoro, Gina Rodriguez as Princess Marisa, Prince Royce as Prince Marzel, Travis Willingham as Cuco Song: "The Most Royal Man", sung by Prince Marzel
46	21	"Movin' On Up"	Nathan Chew	S : Rachel Ruderman and Tom Rogers; T : Jeffrey M. Howard	Julius Aguimatang, Casey Lowe and Arielle Yett; Cole Harrington (additional)	February 16, 2019	220	0.71
Elena invites Mateo to live in the royal palace, but his mom thinks that she can live there too, complicating matters. Guest stars: Dee Bradley Baker as Kupi-Kupi, Ana Ortiz as Rafa, Kitana Turnbull as Olivia Song: "Never Get Away", sung by Rafa and Mateo
47	22	"Not Without My Magic"	Robb Pratt	Rachel Ruderman	Julius Aguimatang, Casey Lowe and Arielle Yett; Cole Harrington (additional)	March 23, 2019	223	0.71
Elena's scepter begins malfunctioning, so she has to fight a creature without using any of her magical abilities. Guest stars: Grey Griffin as Ash Delgado, Diane Guerrero as Vestia, Mario Lopez as Cruz, Cheech Marin as Quita Moz, Lou Diamond Phillips as Victor Delgado, André Sogliuzzo as King Verago, Myrna Velasco as Carla Delgado Song: "More Than Your Magic", sung by Skylar and Elena
48	23	"Luna's Big Leap"	Nathan Chew	Tom Rogers	Aldin Baroza, Gavin Dell, Francis Glebas and James A. Little; Cole Harrington (additional)	April 27, 2019	224	0.79
Luna is given a chance to be promoted, but when she becomes too confident, it has disastrous consequences. Guest stars: Dee Bradley Baker as Dragallos, Miles Gerber as Rayo, Jess Harnell as Chief Zephyr, Jenifer Lewis as Tornado, André Sogliuzzo as King Verago Song: "Give Me a Shot", sung by Luna
49	24	"Naomi Knows Best"	Robb Pratt	Jessica Lopez	Scotland Barnes, Fred Reyes and Robert Souza; Cole Harrington (additional)	June 1, 2019	225	0.51
When Elena and her friends are captured by three evil wizards, Ash, Victor, and Carla, Naomi has no choice, but to save them by any means necessary. Guest stars: Grey Griffin as Ash Delgado, Echo Kellum as King Joaquín, Lou Diamond Phillips as Victor Delgado, Myrna Velasco as Carla Delgado Song: "Speak", sung by Migs, Skylar and Naomi

=== Season 3 (2019–20) ===
Note: Starting with this season like the other Disney Junior shows from the time, episode title cards have been discontinued, but the titles are still spoken.

No. overall	No. in season	Title	Directed by	Written by	Storyboard by	Original release date	Prod. code	U.S. viewers (millions)
50	1	"Sister of Invention"	Robb Pratt	Tom Rogers	Fred Reyes, Robert Souza and Arielle Yett; Cole Harrington and Jenessa Warren (additionals)	October 7, 2019	301	0.33
In an attempt to prove she is a valuable team member, Isabel involves herself in a mission which puts the team in great personal danger. Guest stars: Kyle Arem as Quique, Grey Griffin as Ash Delgado, Montse Hernandez as Cristina, Lou Diamond Phillips as Victor Delgado, Tony Shalhoub as Zopilote, Myrna Velasco as Carla Delgado Song: "The One and Only", sung by Ash
51	2	"To Save a Sunbird"	Nathan Chew	Rachel Ruderman	Julius Aguimatang, Aldin Baroza, Cole Harrington and James A. Little; Steven Umbleby (additional)	October 8, 2019	302	0.33
Elena goes to the jaquin realm in an attempt to save the sunbird who repaired her magical scepter. Guest stars: Whoopi Goldberg as Lama, Lucas Grabeel as Jiku, Grey Griffin as Ash Delgado, Mikey Kelley as Higgins, Cloris Leachman as Hool, Kate Micucci as Young Hool, Lou Diamond Phillips as Victor Delgado, Tony Plana as Qapa, Myrna Velasco as Carla Delgado Song: "In the Glorious Now", sung by Young Hool and Elena
52	3	"Father-in-Chief"	Robb Pratt	S : Rachel Ruderman and Tom Rogers; T : Cam Baity	Scotland D. Barnes, Giovanny F. Cardenas and Francis Glebas; Cole Harrington and Steven Umbleby (additionals)	October 9, 2019	303	0.29
Migs is forced to bring his jaquin kids along for the ride on the day the next chief of the jaquins is to be chosen. Guest stars: Grant George as Troyo, Desmond Gerber as Mingo, Lucas Grabeel as Jiku, Jess Harnell as Chief Zephyr, Gia Lopez as Estrella, Rosie Perez as Dulce, Maximus Riegel as Zoom, Mick Wingert as Bruce Song: "Chief Daddy", sung by Migs and his children
53	4	"The Incredible Shrinking Royals"	Nathan Chew	S : Tom Rogers; T : Kate Kondell	James A. Little, Fred Reyes, Robert Souza and Arielle Yett; Steven Umbleby (additional)	October 10, 2019	304	0.27
The Feast of Friendship goes horribly wrong when all the royals are shrunk, thanks to magic. Guest stars: Dee Bradley Baker as the Crayfish, Jaime Camil as Julio, Chrissie Fit as Princess Valentina, Jess Harnell as King Hector, Justina Machado as Carmen, Constance Marie as Doña Paloma, Andrea Martin as Queen Abigail, George Takei as King Toshi Song: "In Her Honor", sung by Julio
54	5	"Norberg Peace Prize"	Nathan Chew	Rachel Ruderman	Julius Aguimatang, Samantha Arnett, Aldin Baroza and James A. Little; Steven Umbleby (additional)	October 11, 2019	305	0.32
Elena travels to the Kingdom of Norberg and attempts to assist two rulers, hoping they can work out their disagreements. Guest stars: Rachel Brosnahan as Princess Chloe, Trevor Devall as Nathaniel, Jess Harnell as King Hector, Andrea Martin as Queen Abigail, Julie Nathanson as Scarlett Turner, Rich Sommer as Captain Turner Song: "Royal Friends", sung by Elena, Queen Abigail and King Hector
55	6	"The Magic Within"	Robb Pratt	Tom Rogers and Rachel Ruderman	Julius Aguimatang, Scotland D. Barnes, Giovanny F. Cardenas, Francis Glebas, Cole Harrington, Robb Pratt, Fred Reyes, Robert Souza and Arielle Yett	October 13, 2019	306–307	0.45
Elena's magical powers are increased when she falls into a crystal well. With these new abilities, she finds out about Esteban's dirty secret. Guest stars: Jaime Camil as Julio, Kether Donohue as Flo, Grey Griffin as Ash Delgado, Mikey Kelley as Higgins, Constance Marie as Doña Paloma, Gaby Moreno as Marlena, Lou Diamond Phillips as Victor Delgado, Myrna Velasco as Carla Delgado Songs: "Happy to Be Alive", sung by Elena, "The Wonder of Me", sung by Doña Paloma, Naomi, Gabe and Marlena, "With Everyone", sung by Marlena, Naomi, Gabe and Doña Paloma, "Love Always", sung by Elena, her family and the Avalorans
56	7	"Flower of Light"	Nathan Chew	T : Silvia Olivas; S/T : Cam Baity	Julius Aguimatang, Samantha Arnett, Aldin Baroza and Francis Glebas; Cole Harrington and Steven Umbleby (additionals)	October 16, 2019	314	0.33
Elena is forced to save Día de los Muertos by stopping two disruptive spirits. Guest stars: Nestor Carbonell as King Raul, Eugenio Derbez as Guillermo, Taye Diggs as Sanza, Olga Merediz as Felicia, Rene Mujica as Ricardo, Andrea Navedo as Queen Lucia Song: "The Spirit of Love", sung by Felicia, Elena and the spirits
57	8	"Captain Mateo"	Nathan Chew	Kate Kondell	Samantha Arnett, Aldin Baroza, Francis Glebas and Steven Umbleby	October 17, 2019	TBA	0.22
Gabe and Mateo's friendship becomes strained after Mateo becomes the captain of the Avaloran Royal Guard. Guest stars: Kether Donohue as Flo, Grey Griffin as Ash Delgado, Mikey Kelley as Higgins, Constance Marie as Doña Paloma, Tony Shalhoub as Zopilote Songs: "In Charge", sung by Mateo and Gabe, "Love Always (Reprise)", sung by Elena and Gabe
58	9	"Sugar Rush"	Nathan Chew	Cam Baity	Fred Reyes, Robert Souza and Arielle Yett; Steven Umbleby (additional)	October 18, 2019	310	0.29
Elena is convinced by her grandmother, Luisa, to open a chocolate shop in Avalor. Guest stars: Kether Donohue as Flo, Echo Kellum as King Joaquín, Marsai Martin as Princess Caterina Songs: "Pick It Up", sung by Elena, Isabel and Flo, "Chocolate Oh So Sweet", sung by Luisa, Elena and Isabel
59	10	"The Family Treasure"	Robb Pratt	Tom Rogers	Scotland D. Barnes, Giovanny F. Cardenas and James A. Little; Cole Harrington (additional)	October 21, 2019	309	0.30
Elena and her sister Isabel help two brothers with their quest to uncover a treasure. Guest stars: Danny Trejo as Antonio Agama, Rene Mujica as Pablo Agama Song: "That's What Sisters Do", sung by Elena, Isabel and the Agama brothers
60	11	"Dreamcatcher"	Robb Pratt	Rachel Ruderman	Samantha Arnett, Aldin Baroza and Francis Glebas; Cole Harrington (additional)	October 22, 2019	311	0.31
Elena confronts her deep-rooted feelings when her dreams become real. Guest stars: Grey Griffin as Ash Delgado, Tony Shalhoub as Zopilote Song: "Unspoken", sung by Elena
61	12	"Changing of the Guard"	Nathan Chew	Kate Kondell	Scotland D. Barnes, Giovanny F. Cardenas, Becky Cassidy, James A. Little and Arielle Yett; Cole Harrington (additional)	October 23, 2019	312	0.24
Elena assists Antonia, the Royal Seamstress, in her attempt to become the first woman in the Avaloran Royal Guard. Guest stars: Arturo Castro as Felipe, Bernardo Cubria as Alejandro and Santino, Melissa Fumero as Antonia, Mikey Kelley as Higgins and Pirate Captain, Allen Maldonado as Rocco, Dustin Ybarra as Nacho Song: "You Must Persist", sung by Elena and Antonia
62	13	"King Skylar"	Robb Pratt	Tom Rogers	Fred Reyes, Robert Souza and Arielle Yett; Cole Harrington (additional)	October 24, 2019	313	0.34
Skylar becomes king of the jaquins when King Verago becomes sick. Guest stars: Jim Cummings as Jinx, Grant George as Troyo, Miles Gerber as Rayo, Jenifer Lewis as Tornado, Lincoln Melcher as Avión, Jenna Lea Rosen as Ciela, André Sogliuzzo as King Verago, Mick Wingert as Bruce, Wilber Zaldivar as Nico Song: "Wings Up", sung by Elena and Luna
63	14	"Spirit of a Wizard"	Robb Pratt	Rachel Ruderman	Scotland D. Barnes, Giovanny F. Cardenas and James Little; Cole Harrington (additional)	October 25, 2019	315	0.31
Mateo and Elena attempt to free Alacazar, Mateo's grandfather, from a book. Guest stars: Kether Donohue as Flo, Grey Griffin as Ash Delgado, Tony Shalhoub as Zopilote, André Sogliuzzo as Alacazar Song: "By My Side", sung by Mateo and Alacazar
64	15	"Team Isa"	Nathan Chew	Kate Kondell	Kelly Hobby-Bishop, Fred Reyes, Robert Souza and Arielle Yett; Steven Umbleby (additional)	November 15, 2019	316	0.24
A magical bandit puts Elena and her friends in a magical trance. Isabel and her buddies are the only ones who can save the day. Guest stars: Kyle Arem as Quique, Zoe Hendrix as Amara, Montse Hernandez as Cristina, Anthony Ramos as Tito, Kitana Turnbull as Olivia Songs: "When Tito So Sweetly Sings", sung by Tito, "More, More, More", sung by Tito, Elena and her friends
65	16	"The Last Laugh"	Robb Pratt	Tom Rogers	Julius Aguimatang, Samantha Arnett, Aldin Baroza and Francis Glebas; Cole Harrington (additional)	November 22, 2019	317	0.33
When Veronica, Naomi's childhood friend, comes to visit, Naomi begins to rethink her role on the Grand Council. Guest stars: Auliʻi Cravalho as Veronica, Grey Griffin as Ash Delgado, Tom Kenny as Chiki-Chiki and Pili, Gina Torres as Chatana Song: "Chasing Down the Wind", sung by Naomi and Veronica
66	17	"Festival of Lights"	Craig Gerber	Rachel Ruderman	Fred Reyes, Robert Souza and Arielle Yett; Cole Harrington (additional)	December 6, 2019	319	0.23
Elena learns what it means to celebrate the holiday of Hanukkah. Guest stars: Tovah Feldshuh as Grandma Miriam, Jamie-Lynn Sigler as Princess Rebeca, Julian Zane as Prince Ari Song: "Hanukkah Night", sung by Princess Rebeca
67	18	"The Birthday Cruise"	Nathan Chew	S : Rachel Ruderman; T : Cam Baity	Scotland D. Barnes, Giovanny F. Cardenas, Kelly Hobby-Bishop and James A. Little; Steven Umbleby and Cole Harrington (additionals)	January 10, 2020	318	0.29
Elena gives Princess Chloe a present: a birthday cruise. Guest stars: Rachel Brosnahan as Princess Chloe, Sofia Carson as Maliga, Chrissie Fit as Princess Valentina, Jamie-Lynn Sigler as Princess Rebeca Songs: "Give It a Whirl", sung by Elena and Princess Chloe, "Avalor Birthday Song (Reprise)", sung by Elena, Mateo, and Princesses Valentina and Rebeca
68	19	"Giant Steps"	Robb Pratt	Tom Rogers	Julius Aguimatang, Samantha Arnett, Aldin Baroza, Francis Glebas and Steven Umbleby	February 7, 2020	320	0.33
Naomi comes back to Avalor, warning Elena of a growing threat to Avalor itself. Guest stars: Susanne Blakeslee as Ship Chandler, Grey Griffin as Ash Delgado, Tom Kenny as Pili, John Leguizamo as Tziloco, Roman Reigns as Kizin, Gina Torres as Chatana Song: "Everything's Fine", sung by Elena and Naomi
69	20	"Shooting Stars"	Nathan Chew	Kate Kondell	Scotland D. Barnes, Giovanny F. Cardenas, Kelly Hobby-Bishop, James A. Little and Kris.W; Steven Umbleby and Cole Harrington (additionals)	March 6, 2020	321	0.24
Elena and Isabel work together to fix a telescope, so their grandfather can see a comet. Guest stars: Kether Donohue as Flo, Kimiko Glenn as Tomiko, Carla Tassara as Professor Ochoa Song: "Put Your Mind to It", sung by Tomiko, Elena and Isabel
70	21	"Crash Course"	Robb Pratt	Tom Rogers	Fred Reyes, Robert Souza and Arielle Yett; Steven Umbleby (additional)	April 3, 2020	323	0.47
A flashy wizard, Bronzino, is recruited by Gabe to teach the Avaloran Royal Guards. Guest stars: Arturo Castro as Felipe, Melissa Fumero as Antonia, James Monroe Iglehart as Bronzino, Josh Keaton as Miguel, Constance Marie as Doña Paloma, Arturo Del Puerto as Rico Song: "Magic Works Like a Charm", sung by Bronzino
71	22	"Sweetheart's Day"	Nathan Chew	Rachel Ruderman	Julius Aguimatang, Samantha Arnett, Aldin Baroza, Francis Glebas, Kris. W and Arielle Yett; Steven Umbleby (additional)	May 8, 2020	322	0.49
Armando tries to impress a girl he likes, Marlena, but things go terribly wrong when the potion he mixes causes everyone in Avalor to sing without stopping. Guest stars: Kether Donohue as Flo, Constance Marie as Doña Paloma, Gaby Moreno as Marlena Songs: "Something in the Air", sung by Flo, Elena, Isabel, and the Royal Staff and Guards, "Potion", sung by Mateo, Elena and Flo, "Sweeter Days", sung by Luisa and Isabel, "Sweetheart's Day", sung by Marlena, Elena, Mateo, Flo and the Avalorans, "All You Need and More", sung by Doña Paloma and Mateo, "You Gotta Sing", sung by Mateo, Elena and Flo, "The Perfect Girl/Guy for Me", sung by Armando and Marlena
72	23	"The Lightning Warrior"	Robb Pratt	Kate Kondell	Scotland D. Barnes, Giovanny F. Cardenas, Kelly Hobby-Bishop and James A. Little; Steven Umbleby (additional)	July 19, 2020	324	0.24
Elena frees Ixlan, a new ally, from a magical curse. Guest stars: Stephanie Beatriz as Ixlan, Laila Berzins as Moyacu, Cheech Marin as Quita Moz, Lou Diamond Phillips as Victor Delgado, Robert Pine as Octavio, Myrna Velasco as Carla Delgado Song: "Way Back When", sung by Victor, Carla and Elena
73	24	"Día de las Madres"	Nathan Chew	Rachel Ruderman	Fred Reyes, Robert Souza, Kris W. and Arielle Yett	July 26, 2020	325	0.34
Luisa begins to doubt whether she is a good mother after all. Guest stars: Nestor Carbonell as King Raul, Kether Donohue as Flo, Grey Griffin as Baby Isabel, Royal Painter and Trudy, Hailey Hermosa as Young Elena, Ian Inigo as Young Esteban, Andrea Navedo as Queen Lucia Song: "How We Love You", sung by Elena, Isabel, Francisco and Flo
74	25	"Heart of the Jaguar"	Robb Pratt	Tom Rogers	Julius Aguimatang, Samantha Arnett, Aldin Baroza and Francis Glebas; Steven Umbleby (additional)	August 2, 2020	326	0.31
Isabel goes on a quest to find her inner courage. Guest stars: Jess Harnell as Jaguar King, Mikey Kelley as Pug-Nosed Noblin, Cheech Marin as Quita Moz, Max Mittelman as Big-Eared Noblin, Kathy Najimy as Peaches, Mick Wingert as Bruce Song: "Choose or Lose", sung by Noblins
75	26	"Elena's Day Off"	Nathan Chew	Kate Kondell	Scotland D. Barnes, Giovanny F. Cardenas, Kelly Hobby-Bishop, James A. Little and Kris. W	August 9, 2020	327	0.32
Elena tries to take a day off before her royal coronation. Guest stars: Malachi Barton as Leo, Stephanie Beatriz as Ixlan, Jaime Camil as Julio, Chrissie Fit as Leo's Mom, Desmond Gerber as Mingo, Ruth Livier as Countess Dolores, Constance Marie as Doña Paloma, Alma Martinez as Lady Yolanda, Rene Mujica as Pablo Agama, Robert Pine as Octavio, Danny Trejo as Antonio Agama Song: "Girl's Day", sung by Naomi, Isabel, Elena and Ixlan
76	27	"To Queen or Not to Queen"	Robb Pratt	Rachel Ruderman	Fred Reyes, Robert Souza and Arielle Yett; Steven Umbleby (additional)	August 16, 2020	328	0.22
Elena questions whether she should be queen and Zuzo shows her an alternate reality of what it could have been. Guest stars: James Monroe Iglehart as Bronzino, Mikey Kelley as Higgins, Constance Marie as Doña Paloma, Alma Martinez as Lady Yolanda Song: "Choose Your Path", sung by Elena
77	28	"Coronation Day"	Elliot M. Bour, Nathan Chew and Robb Pratt	S : Kate Kondell, Silvia Olivas and Tom Rogers; S/T : Craig Gerber and Rachel Ruderman	Julius Aguimatang, Scotland D. Barnes, Giovanny F. Cardenas, Kelly Hobby-Bishop, James A. Little, Fred Reyes, Robert Souza, Steve Umbleby, Kris.W and Arielle Yett	August 23, 2020	335	0.34
Elena travels to the spirit realm and has to fight off villains who want to take over Avalor before they ruin her royal coronation. Guest stars: Fred Armisen as Yolo, Stephanie Beatriz as Ixlan, Rachel Brosnahan as Princess Chloe, Darcy Rose Byrnes as Princess Amber, Jaime Camil as Julio, Nestor Carbonell as King Raul, Kether Donohue as Flo, Eden Espinosa as Orizaba, Chrissie Fit as Princess Valentina, Melissa Fumero as Antonia, Andy García as Hetz, Grant George as Troyo, Desmond Gerber as Mingo, Whoopi Goldberg as Lama, Grey Griffin as Ash Delgado, Mark Hamill as Vuli, Jess Harnell as King Hector and Chief Zephyr, Mikey Kelley as Higgins, Echo Kellum as King Joaquín, Tom Kenny as Pili, Cloris Leachman as Hool, John Leguizamo as Tziloco, Gia Lopez as Estrella, Mario Lopez as Cruz, Justina Machado as Carmen, Constance Marie as Doña Paloma, Cheech Marin as Quita Moz, Andrea Martin as Queen Abigail, Max Mittelman as Bobo, Gaby Moreno as Marlena, Julie Nathanson as Scarlett Turner, Andrea Navedo as Queen Lucia, Ana Ortiz as Rafa, Lou Diamond Phillips as Victor Delgado, Tyler Posey as Prince Alonso, Gina Rodriguez as Princess Marisa, Tony Shalhoub as Zopilote, Jamie-Lynn Sigler as Princess Rebeca, Jenny Slate as Cahu, André Sogliuzzo as King Verago, Rich Sommer as Captain Turner, George Takei as King Toshi, Gina Torres as Chatana, Myrna Velasco as Carla Delgado, Patrick Warburton as Grand Macaw, Ariel Winter as Princess Sofia Songs: "Long May She Reign", sung by Marlena, Armando, the Jaquins and children, "Fit to Be Queen", sung by Elena, and her family, friends and allies, "The Four Shades of Awesome", sung by the Four Shades of Awesome, "Never Too Late", sung by Elena and Esteban, "Guiding Light", sung by Elena and everybody

== Film (2016) ==
- Elena and the Secret of Avalor, a crossover television film with Sofia the First, which premiered on November 20, 2016.

== Shorts ==
Shorts overview
Season	Episodes	Originally released	
Season	Episodes	First released	Last released
Adventures in Vallestrella	5	October 14, 2017	
Scepter Training with Zuzo	5	February 24, 2018	
The Secret Life of Sirenas	5	September 21, 2018	September 22, 2018
Discovering the Magic Within	5	October 13, 2019	October 19, 2019

=== Adventures in Vallestrella (2017) ===
A short-form series titled Elena of Avalor: Adventures in Vallestrella premiered on Disney Junior on October 14, 2017, starring Elena and Isabel as they help baby Jaquins in Vallestrella.

No.	Title	Online release date
1	"Flight of the Butterfrog"	October 14, 2017
2	"Human Nature"	October 14, 2017
3	"Sleeping Sunbird"	October 14, 2017
4	"Fast Food"	October 14, 2017
5	"Peabunny Boogie"	October 14, 2017

=== Scepter Training with Zuzo (2018) ===
A second short-form series debuted on Disney Junior on February 24, 2018. It involves Zuzo, Elena's animal spirit guide, training her to properly use and strengthen the strong powers of her Scepter of Light.

No.	Title	Online release date
1	"Royal Treasury Escape Room"	February 24, 2018
2	"The Heist"	February 24, 2018
3	"Nothing But Blaze"	February 24, 2018
4	"Stowaway"	February 24, 2018
5	"Don't Be Our Guest"	February 24, 2018

=== The Secret Life of Sirenas (2018) ===
A third short-form series entitled The Secret Life of Sirenas follows the movie Song of the Sirenas, which features the Sirenas in their day-to-day lives. It debuted on Disney Junior on September 21, 2018.

No.	Title	Online release date
1	"Off to the Races"	September 21, 2018
2	"Feeling Clammy"	September 21, 2018
3	"Walk This Way"	September 21, 2018
4	"Marisa and the Mirror"	September 22, 2018
5	"One-Octopus Band"	September 22, 2018

=== Discovering the Magic Within (2019) ===
A fourth short-form series entitled Discovering the Magic Within follows the special The Magic Within, which features Princess Elena and her family and friends dealing with her newly strengthened magical abilities. It debuted on Disney Junior on October 13, 2019.

No.	Title	Online release date
1	"When the Royal Family's Away"	October 13, 2019
2	"Spring Cleaning"	October 15, 2019
3	"Not So Basic Training"	October 17, 2019
4	"No Good Deed Goes Unpunished"	October 17, 2019
5	"Modern Royal Family"	October 19, 2019
