= Elena of Avalor =

American animated children's television series

- Genre: Adventure; Fantasy; Comedy
- Created by: Craig Gerber
- Based on: Sofia the First by Craig Gerber
- Voices of: Aimee Carrero; Jenna Ortega; Chris Parnell; Yvette Nicole Brown; Carlos Alazraqui; Emiliano Diez; Julia Vera; Christian Lanz; Jillian Rose Reed; Joseph Haro; Jorge Diaz; Keith Ferguson; Joe Nunez
- Theme music composer: John Kavanaugh; Craig Gerber
- Opening theme: "Elena of Avalor" by Gaby Moreno
- Ending theme: "Elena of Avalor" (instrumental)
- Composer: Tony Morales
- Country of origin: United States
- Original language: English
- No. of seasons: 3
- No. of episodes: 77 (list of episodes)

Production
- Executive producer: Craig Gerber
- Producer: Pilar Flynn (S2–3)
- Running time: 24 minutes; 48 minutes (two-part episodes); 68 minutes ("Coronation Day)
- Production company: Disney Television Animation (Note: Animation outsourced to ICON Creative Studio Inc. (production and animation), Arc Productions (animation only in Season 1), TeamTO (animation only in Season 1), and Technicolor Animation Productions (animation only in Seasons 2–3))

Original release
- Network: Disney Channel; Disney Junior
- Release: July 22, 2016 – August 23, 2020

Related
- Sofia the First; Sofia the First: Royal Magic; Elena and the Secret of Avalor

Elena of Avalor is an American animated children's television series created by Craig Gerber. It premiered on Disney Channel on July 22, 2016, before it was moved to Disney Junior on July 14, 2018. The series features Aimee Carrero as the voice of Elena, Disney's first Latina princess.

The series aired 77 episodes, in three seasons, between July 22, 2016, to August 23, 2020, when the series finale aired. The series was generally lauded for its incorporation of Latin influences, music, and traditions, focus on family and friendship, and multiculturalism, with some calling Elena a strong role model for young girls, with others critical of how Latino diversity was portrayed in the series.

== Plot ==
Princess Elena Castillo Flores has been freed from the Amulet of Avalor by Princess Sofia and has saved her magical kingdom of Avalor from the evil sorceress Shuriki. As she had been trapped in the amulet for 41 years while Shuriki ruled the kingdom, she must now learn to rule as its crown princess. Since she is only 16 years old, she must follow the guidance of a Grand Council, composed of her grandparents, older cousin Chancellor Esteban, and a new friend, Naomi Turner. Elena also looks to her little sister, Isabel, her friends, wizard Mateo, and Royal Guard lieutenant, Gabe, a spirit animal named Zuzo, and a trio of magical flying creatures called Jaquins for guidance and support.

In the first season, Elena adjusts to her new life as crown princess, while learning to master the power of her scepter. At the end of the season, Elena learns from Quita Moz of the Sunbird Oracles that she will soon be facing a darkness and will be tested on her bravery and leadership; if she fails, she will never become queen.

In the second season, Elena spends time preparing for her test while simultaneously facing Victor and Carla Delgado, who have teamed up with Shuriki, who has her powers restored. She also befriends the Sirenas of Nueva Vista, and enlists their help to defeat Shuriki.

In the third and final season, Esteban is revealed to have been in on Shuriki's original takeover of the kingdom more than 41 years ago, and is banished from the kingdom. Meanwhile, Elena is granted new emotion-based powers after falling into a crystal well in Takaina. She spends the season preparing for her coronation as queen, learning to control her emotion magic, and facing down the Delgados' wicked matriarch, Ash.

Elena's adventures lead her to understand that her role requires thoughtfulness, resilience, and compassion, the traits of great leaders.

== Episodes ==
| Season | Episodes | Originally released | |
| Season | Episodes | First released | Last released |
|---|---|---|---|
| 1 | 25 | July 22, 2016 | October 1, 2017 |
| 2 | 24 | October 14, 2017 | June 1, 2019 |
| 3 | 28 | October 7, 2019 | August 23, 2020 |

== Production ==
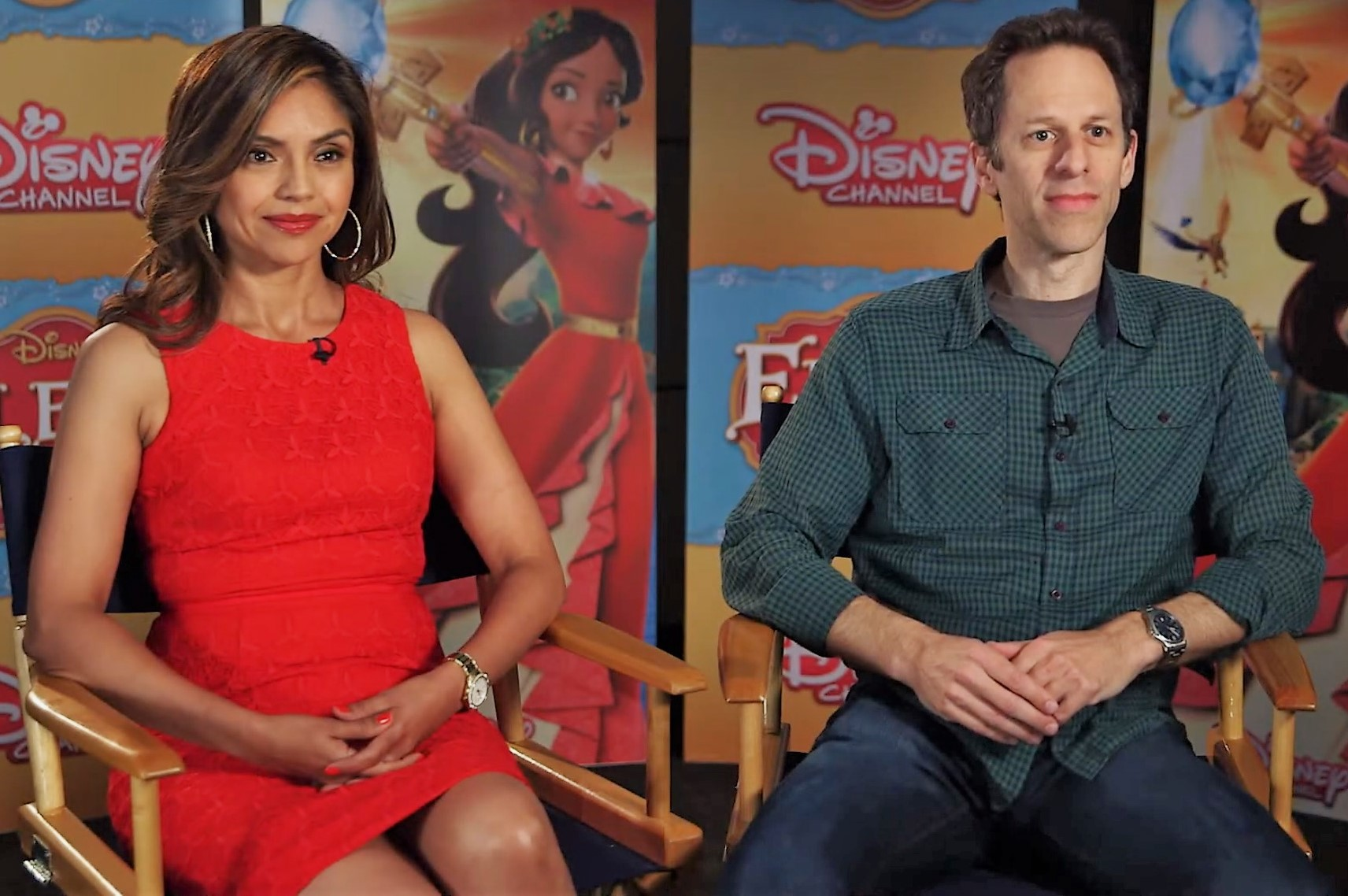
Story editor Silvia Cardenas Olivas and producer Craig Gerber discuss Elena of Avalor in 2016

In January 2015, it was announced that Elena would be newest Disney princess, inspired by diverse Latin folklore and cultures, and would debut in Sofia the First in 2016, with Aimee Carrero voicing Elena. Following this announcement, some, like Suzanne Samin, were critical. In an article in Bustle, she said she was glad that Disney "finally created a Latina princess" but was disappointed that she will not "have her own movie," but had, at the time, "the potential to get her own TV show later on."

In June 2016, the music video for "My Time," the series opening theme, was released.

Prior to the series premiere, the Walt Disney Company promoted the series as incorporating influences from "diverse Latin and Hispanic cultures through architecture, traditions, food and customs" and featuring original songs spanning Latin musical styles such as "Mariachi, Latin Pop, Salsa, Banda and Chilean Hip Hop," and linked to related articles by writers saying the same, and a graphic noting where the show's staff drew their inspirations from. ABC News also noted that the series would not give Elena a romantic interest, that Elena would have "special powers," that Carrero would sing in every episode, and each episode would have a song. Disney was also reported to preparing for a "lavish coronation" for the series with promotional stops of the show's characters through the Walt Disney World Resort and Disneyland Resort, along with the production of "print and e-book titles based on the character and her story," as well as "dolls, role-play products, accessories, home décor and apparel."

The series' creator, and executive producer, Craig Gerber also told USA Today that it was "very important to us that, since we were doing a show with a kingdom inspired by Latin American culture, that we get that right. Even though it's a fairytale world, there are things that feel very authentic." Story editor Silvia Olivas told the same publication that the series had "cultural consultants" on every step, reading "everything from the premise all the way through the final draft" while Latin music consultant Rene Camacho stated that the music styles used in the series was "all Latin-based, it's very festive" and consultant Diane Rodriguez said that the series has an evocative "visual element...[which] takes the look of the Latino culture, of the Americas, almost to another level." Gerber told ABC11 he saw demand for a Disney princess who was Latina while working on Sofia the First. Olivas told the same publication that she drew inspiration from her family and upbringing for the series, adding she was inspired by those mothers who are affected by the show, and said she was glad that young audiences saw Elena as a "beautiful, smart leader" who they want to be like. In an exclusive with Fast Company, prior to the series release, the series was described as part of a push by the Disney for princesses to create "their own narratives that don't revolve around snaring the affections of a man" like in Frozen and as having cultural advisors such as Marcela Davison Avilés and Diane Rodriguez.

Carrero also told ABC News that she was honored to voice the company's first Latina Princess. Carrero further described Elena as "the first princess actively ruling her kingdom" who is her "own hero" without a Prince Charming, and is learning that leadership is "about sacrifice and not...[a] sort of totalitarian control over the people that she rules". She asserted that Elena's role as princess "sort of resembles more of a president than...[a] princess". Olivas was later described by Remezcla as series head writer, with the series allowing her to use "her voice" to bring to bring the story of Elena to life in "the fictional Latin American inspired land of Avalor."

The series was renewed for a second season on August 11, 2016. Elena would make her debut at the Magic Kingdom at Walt Disney World and the Girl Scouts would partner with Disney to create a leadership guide inspired by the series in August 2016. The series was renewed for a third season on February 13, 2017.

On September 17, 2019, it was announced that the third season would premiere on October 7, 2019. It was later confirmed that this would be the final season of the series. Some news outlets, like ComicBook and TV Line, claimed that the series was cancelled by Disney.

== Broadcast and release ==
The series would begin airing on the Disney Channel on July 22, 2016. Prior to this, the debut episode "First Day of Rule" was distributed on-demand on June 20, 2016 by Rogers TV in Canada and Disney scheduled the online release in the United States for July 1, 2016. An episode of the series aired as a sneak peek on Disney Channel in the UK and Ireland on July 15, 2016, and more episodes aired later in the year.

A television movie titled Elena and the Secret of Avalor, which shows the origins of the series, premiered on November 20, 2016. Following the first season's release, there was an official digital release of 23 songs, and an official CD release with seven songs.

The second season premiered on October 14, 2017, with guest stars such as Whoopi Goldberg, Gia Lopez, Rosie Perez, Steve Buscemi, and Cloris Leachman appearing in the season.

The third season would premiere on October 7, 2019, with the season including guest stars such as Melissa Fumero, Stephanie Beatriz, Allen Maldonado, Gina Torres, Anthony Ramos, and James Monroe Iglehart.

On November 12, 2019, the series began streaming on Disney+.

The series concluded on August 23, 2020 with a prime-time one-hour special, and final episode, entitled "Elena of Avalor: Coronation Day."

== Home media ==
Home media is distributed by Walt Disney Studios Home Entertainment.

Elena of Avalor home video releases
| Season | Episodes | Years active | Release dates |
| Season | Episodes | Years active | Region 1 |
|---|---|---|---|
| 1 | 25 | 2016–17 | Volume 1: Ready to Rule (episodes 1-4): December 6, 2016; Volume 2: Elena and the Secret of Avalor (episodes 5-8 + "Elena and the Secret of Avalor" (TV film): February 7, 2017; Volume 3: Celebrations to Remember (episodes 9, 11, 14, 16-18): September 12, 2017; Volume 4: Realm of the Jaquins ("Realm of the Jaquins"): August 7, 2018 |
| 2 | 24 | 2017–19 | Volume 4: Realm of the Jaquins ("Three Jaquins and a Princess" and "Shapeshifters"): August 7, 2018 |
| Adventures in Vallestrella | 5 | 2017 | Volume 4: Realm of the Jaquins (All shorts): August 7, 2018 |
| Scepter Training with Zuzo | 5 | 2018 | Volume 4: Realm of the Jaquins (All shorts): August 7, 2018 |
Special features
Volume 1: Ready to Rule (Region 1): 'Projection scepter' Volume 2: Elena and the Secret of Avalor (Region 1): 'Jaquin mobile', and 'Music video: "My Time"' Volume 3: Celebrations to Remember (Region 1): 'Elena locket'

=== Region 2 Season 1 DVDs 2017–2018 ===
In the UK, Disney released the first DVD, Elena of Avalor: Ready to Rule in English on 30 January 2017.

A second DVD called, Elena And The Secret of Avalor, was released on 17 July 2017.

A third and final DVD Disney released in the UK was called, Elena of Avalor: Celebrations to Remember, on 5 February 2018.

=== Region 2 DVDs future ===
Disney has not released the 4th DVD called A Realm of the Jacquins in Region 2 in the UK, since the Elena of Avalor: Celebrations to Remember DVD came out on 5 February 2018.

==== Main Series ====
Region 2
| Season | DVD Title | Episode Count | Aspect Ratio | Total running time | Release Date |
|---|---|---|---|---|---|
| 1 | "Elena of Avalor: Ready to Rule (Episodes are: First Day Of Rule / Model Sister, All Heated Up, & Island of Youth)" | 4 | 16:9 | 87 Minutes | 30 January 2017 |
| 1 | "Elena And The Secret of Avalor (Episodes are: Elena and the Secret of Avalor', 'Spellbound', 'Finders Leapers', 'Prince Too Charming', and 'Royal Retreat)" | 5 | 16:9 | 2 hours and 28 Minutes | 17 July 2017 |
| 1 | "Elena of Avalor: Celebrations to Remember (Episodes are: "A Day to Remember", "Navidad", "King of the Carnaval", "My Fair Naomi", "Crystal in the Rough", & "Captain Turner Returns")" | 6 | 16:9 | 2 hours and 10 Minutes | 5 February 2018 |

== Reception ==
The series received generally positive reception. Emily Ashby of Common Sense Media described the series protagonist, Elena, as a "spunky Latina-inspired princess" and said she is an "excellent role model". She said that while a few scenes might be "scary for youngsters" there are strong themes of "friendship, family relationships...honesty, fairness, and kindness" and called the series funny and heartwarming. She additionally argued that the show's incorporation of Latin influences was a "welcome change in kids' programming". Guests at Disney's California Adventure praised Elena's character, with some telling NPR that Elena was "brave," "fierce," and a "great ruler," and liking that she "loves to help her friends," while others said her character was a great role model for Latina kids.

Manual Betancourt of Mic.com said that Elena's character "breaking new ground for the company", asserted that her kingdom "celebrates a multicultural world that mirrors our own," and adding that the series is a perfect example of how "Latino identity...remains elusive in the real world" with the series epitomizing the "diversity found in Latin American cultures." Amy Amatangelo of The Hollywood Reporter said that the show can "change the narrative so many little girls grow up believing" while praising the "all-inclusive nature of the storytelling," and said that parents should like Elena's character, concluding by saying "Elena of Avalor might not be perfect, but no princess ever is." Amatangelo later wrote an article for the Television Academy, in September 2020, calling the series "groundbreaking" when it debuted, and said that it strives for "authentic representation" while being influenced and inspired by "Latin and Hispanic culture, language, traditions and music."

Patricia Garcia of Vogue called Elena's character a "great role model" for girls, praising the first episode for presenting "multitude of Latino traditions in a fun way, without ever falling into the trap of stereotypes," and liking that the series has a "positive and feminist portrayal of its titular heroine," without any plans for Elena to have romantic interests, with her relationship with male characters as "strictly platonic", and calling Elena a "strong, female leader." Olivia P. Tallet of the Houston Chronicle said that the series was "delighting millions of viewers with strong, feminine leadership and a melting-pot kingdom," quoting people who loved that Disney introduced Elena, and loved the music of the series.

In contrast, Melissa Lozada-Oliva wrote a critical review, on the day of the series release, for The Guardian, saying that although Elena is a "rare Latina princess," she feared that Disney would generalize and "flatten" Latino diversity, noting that Elena's character isn't "indigenous or Afro-Latina" but is a "thin, light-brown Latina princess from Avalor" instead, adding that although Elena is influenced by Mayan and Chilean culture, "her race and ethnicity is...based in Disney fantasy," while comparing her own identity to that of Elena. Media and cultural studies scholar Diana Leon-Boys analyzed the series in her 2023 book, Elena, Princesa of the Periphery: Disney's Flexible Latina Girl. In the book she noted that the show presents Latin American culture with a focus on recognizable events such as Dia de los Muertos and quinceañeras. In her view, this focus appealed to common tropes and was a "flattening of difference" which contributed to a "hollow and flexible flexible representation of Latinidad". The book also "locate[s] and deconstruct[s] the meanings of gendered Latinidad" in the series and Elena's character at Disney theme parks.

Sarah Aroeste reviewed, for Kveller, the December 6, 2019 episode of the series, "Festival of Lights," which introduced a Latina Jewish princess named Rebekah, calling it a "major step forward" for representation of Latina Jews in media, and responded to some criticism that Rebeca's character was "a mish-mosh of Sephardic and Ashkenazi customs." She argued that although Disney could have gone further and made Rebekah a "full-on Sephardic Jewish character," individuals should celebrate the fact there is an "episode entirely devoted to Hanukkah on a Disney program" instead, calling the special a "great opportunity for Disney and for all its viewers." Adam Eliath of the J. The Jewish News of Northern California called the episode a "missed opportunity," wishing that Disney had done more with the episode. Irene Katz Connelly of The Forward praised the episode as showing how people can "steward a proudly multi-faith society" but called it "baby steps" and criticized the episode in its "elision of Askenazi and Sephardic culture," hoping that if Rebekah returns to the series, there will be "a less Ashkenormative vision of Jewish culture" that lets the "richness of Ladino language and Sephardic culture shine through."

=== Ratings ===
Viewership and ratings per season of Elena of Avalor
| Season | Episodes | First aired | | Last aired | | Avg. viewers (millions) | 18–49 rank |
| Season | Episodes | Date | Viewers (millions) | Date | Viewers (millions) | Avg. viewers (millions) | 18–49 rank |
|---|---|---|---|---|---|---|---|
| 1 | 25 | July 22, 2016 | 2.22 | October 1, 2017 | 1.08 | 1.40 | TBD |
| 2 | 24 | October 14, 2017 | 1.18 | June 1, 2019 | 0.51 | 0.82 | TBD |
| 3 | 22 | October 7, 2019 | 0.33 | August 23, 2020 | 0.34 | TBD | TBD |

=== Awards and nominations ===
| Year | Award | Category | Nominee | Result | Ref. |
|---|---|---|---|---|---|
| 2017 | 44th Annie Awards | Best Animated TV/Broadcast for Children's Audience | Episode: "A Day to Remember" | Nominated | |
| 2017 | Writers Guild of America Awards | Animation | Craig Gerber (episode: "First Day of Rule") | Nominated | |
| 2017 | National Hispanic Media Coalition Impact Awards | Outstanding Animated Series | Craig Gerber and Silvia Olivas | Won | |
| 2018 | NAACP Image Awards | Outstanding Character Voice-Over Performance (Television or Film) | Yvette Nicole Brown | Nominated | |
| 2018 | 45th Daytime Creative Arts Emmy Awards | Outstanding Casting for an Animated Series or Special | Jennifer Trujillo and Brian Mathias | Won | |
| 2018 | 45th Daytime Creative Arts Emmy Awards | Outstanding Music Direction and Composition | Tony Morales | Nominated | |
| 2018 | 45th Daytime Creative Arts Emmy Awards | Outstanding Writing in an Animated Program | Silvia Cardenas Olivas, Craig Gerber, Tom Rogers and Rachel Ruderman | Nominated | |
| 2019 | 46th Daytime Emmy Awards | Outstanding Preschool Children's Animated Series | Craig Gerber, Pilar Flynn, Elliot M. Bour and Silvia Cardenas Olivas | Nominated | |
| 2019 | 46th Daytime Emmy Awards | Outstanding Performer in a Preschool Animated Program | Steve Buscemi, as Saloso (for "The Tides of Change") | Nominated | |
| 2019 | 46th Daytime Emmy Awards | Outstanding Casting for an Animated Series or Special | Jennifer Trujillo and David H. Wright III | Won | |
| 2019 | 46th Daytime Emmy Awards | Outstanding Sound Editing for a Preschool Animation Program | Robert Poole II, Robbi Smith, David Bonilla, J. Lampinen, Chris Coyne and Rich Danhakl | Nominated | |
| 2019 | 46th Daytime Emmy Awards | Outstanding Music Direction and Composition | Tony Morales | Nominated | |
| 2019 | 46th Daytime Emmy Awards | Outstanding Original Song in a Children's or Animated Program | "Fallin' Like a Rock" (for "A Lava Story ") | Nominated | |
| 2020 | 47th Annie Awards | Best TV/Media- Preschool | "Changing of The Guard" | Nominated | |
| 2020 | NAMIC Vision Awards | Animation | Elena of Avalor | Won | |
| 2020 | 47th Daytime Emmy Awards | Outstanding Special Class Animated Program | Craig Gerber, Silvia Olivas, Elliot Bour, Pilar Flynn for (for "The Magic Within") | Nominated | |
| 2020 | 47th Daytime Emmy Awards | Outstanding Directing for a Preschool Animated Program | Elliot Bour, Craig Gerber, Nathan Chew, Robb Pratt and Sam Riegel | Nominated | |
| 2020 | 47th Daytime Emmy Awards | Outstanding Casting for an Animated Series or Special | David Wright, Jennifer Trujillo and Tatiana Bull | Nominated | |
| 2020 | 47th Daytime Emmy Awards | Outstanding Sound Mixing for a Preschool Animation Program | Melissa Ellis and Fil Brown | Won | |
| 2020 | 47th Daytime Emmy Awards | Outstanding Sound Editing for a Preschool Animation Program | Robert Poole II, Robbi Smith, David Bonilla and J. Lampinen | Won | |
| 2020 | 47th Daytime Emmy Awards | Outstanding Music Direction and Composition | Tony Morales | Nominated | |
| 2020 | 47th Daytime Emmy Awards | Outstanding Original Song in a Children's, Young Adult or Animated Program | John Kavanaugh, Craig Gerber and Jeffrey M. Howard ("Movin' on Up") (for "Never Leave") | Nominated | |
| 2020 | 47th Daytime Emmy Awards | Outstanding Writing for a Preschool Animated Program | Craig Gerber, Silvia Cardenas Olivas, Kate Kondell, Tom Rogers, Rachel Ruderman and Cameron Baity | Won | |
| 2021 | 48th Daytime Emmy Awards | Outstanding Performer in a Preschool Animated Program | Mark Hamill as Vuli (for "Coronation Day") | Won | |
| 2021 | 48th Daytime Emmy Awards | Outstanding Performer in a Preschool Animated Program | Patrick Warburton as Grand Macaw (for "Coronation Day") | Nominated | |
| 2021 | 48th Daytime Emmy Awards | Outstanding Casting for an Animated Program | David Wright, Jennifer Trujillo and Tatiana Bull | Won | |
| 2021 | 48th Daytime Emmy Awards | Outstanding Music Direction and Composition for a Preschool, Children's, or Animated Program | Tony Morales | Nominated | |
| 2021 | 48th Daytime Emmy Awards | Outstanding Original Song in a Children's, Young Adult, or Animated Program | John Kavanaugh, Craig Gerber and Rachel Ruderman ("Something in the Air") (for "Sweetheart's Day") | Nominated | |
| 2021 | 48th Daytime Emmy Awards | Outstanding Writing for a Preschool Animated Program | Craig Gerber, Silvia Cardenas Olivas, Kate Kondell, Tom Rogers, Rachel Ruderman and Cameron Baity | Nominated | |
