= Elena and the Secret of Avalor =

2016 animated television movie

- Written by: Craig Gerber
- Story by: Craig Gerber; Michael G. Stern
- Directed by: Jamie Mitchell
- Starring: Aimee Carrero; Ariel Winter
- Music by: Kevin Kliesch; John Kavanaugh
- Country of origin: United States
- Original language: English

Production
- Executive producers: Jamie Mitchell; Craig Gerber
- Running time: 63 minutes
- Production company: Disney Television Animation

Original release
- Network: Disney Channel; Disney Junior
- Release: November 20, 2016

Elena and the Secret of Avalor is an American animated musical children's fantasy television movie crossover between Sofia the First and Elena of Avalor and the backdoor pilot of the latter series, while the events of the film take place during the third season of the former series. Jamie Mitchell served as director, franchise creator Craig Gerber served as teleplay writer based on a story he conceived with Michael G. Stern, and both Mitchell and Gerber served as executive producers.

== Synopsis ==
In Avalor, Crown Princess Elena presents the witch Shuriki's broken wand to her friend Naomi. She tells her how Princess Sofia saved her and the kingdom.

While attending school in Enchancia, Sofia sees a vision of Shuriki murdering Elena's parents, King Raul and Queen Lucia, when her amulet summons her to the castle's secret library. A book in the library turns into the wizard Alacazar, who explains how Elena originally possessed Sofia's amulet. The amulet was given to Elena on her 15th birthday and it saved her life by pulling her inside when Shuriki attacked her after murdering her parents. Alacazar, who was the royal Wizard of Avalor at the time, searched for 41 years for a special Princess who could help him free Elena, eventually turning himself into a book in the Enchancian Castle library and placing the amulet in the castle to wait for the right Princess. Sofia agrees to help him and convinces her family to spend their summer vacation in Avalor and to make a trade agreement there too.

Upon arrival, Sofia is horrified to learn they will meet Shuriki as a formality and notices the cheering crowds are unhappy. Winged jaguars known as jaquins disrupt the welcome feast and agree to help Sofia after she explains her mission. They take her to Alacazar's old house to meet his wizard grandson Mateo. He summons Alacazar's spirit guide Zuzo, who tells Sofia to get Shuriki's wand, which she swipes during a dance. Warning her siblings to hide, Sofia meets Mateo and the jaquins at the Maruvian temple. She magically transforms into a mermaid and places her amulet and Shuriki's wand on an underwater statue, releasing Elena from the amulet. Against the group's objections, Elena insists on confronting Shuriki alone with the witch's wand.

At the palace, Elena confronts Shuriki in the throne room, revealing to Sofia's family how Shuriki usurped the throne. Elena tries to blast Shuriki with her wand, but due to a guard’s interference, the spell ricochets and blasts a tapestry that reveals an enchanted painting of Elena's maternal grandparents Francisco and Luisa and her little sister Isabel. Shuriki reveals that Alcazar placed Elena's sister and grandparents inside the painting to save them and it is immune to her magic. She also explains that her Chancellor Esteban is Elena's cousin. Skylar, one of the Jaquins, rescues Elena while Shuriki throws Sofia's family into the dungeon. After regrouping at Alacazar's house, Sofia, Elena, and Mateo sneak back to the castle, recruit castle chief Armando, and free her family. Luna, another one of the Jaquins, creates a diversion and attacks Shuriki, long enough for Mateo to sneak in and free Elena's family from the painting with magic. The group escapes and rallies the citizens of Avalor against Shuriki, overpowering the guards and storming the palace. Esteban steals Shuriki's wand and gives it to Elena, who snaps it, destroying the source of her power. With her magic lost, Shuriki ages rapidly and falls from the palace bridge, but manages to survive.

Elena assumes her place as Crown Princess of Avalor and gifts her amulet to Sofia. Esteban announces her as the crown princess of the land, Sofia reports her success to Alacazar in Enchancia, who gives her a new dress. In the present, Elena and Naomi decide to lock Shuriki's broken wand pieces in the treasury.

== Cast ==
- Ariel Winter as Princess Sofia, a young princess of Enchancia.
- Aimee Carrero as Princess Elena, the princess of Avalor who was trapped in an amulet.
- Jane Fonda as Shuriki, a sorceress who has been ruling Avalor for over 40 years.
- Sara Ramirez as Queen Miranda, the mother of Sofia.
- Darcy Rose Byrnes as Amber, the sister of Sofia, and princess of Enchancia.
- Tyler Merna as James, the brother of Sofia and prince of Enchancia
- Travis Willingham as Roland II, the father of Sofia.
- Barbara Dirikson as Flora
- Chris Parnell as Migs, a practical male Jaquin, who succeeds Zephyr as Chief of the Jaquins of Avalor.
- Yvette Nicole Brown as Luna, a loud and brash female Jaquin who joined the guard.
- Carlos Alazraqui as Skylar, a fun-loving male Jaquin and the son of King Verago.
- Jenna Ortega as Princess Isabel, the sister of Elena.
- Emiliano Díez as Francisco, the maternal grandfather of Elena, Isabel, and Esteban.
- Julia Vera as Luisa, the maternal grandmother of Elena, Isabel, and Esteban
- Christian Lanz as Chancellor Esteban, a cousin of Elena and collaborator with Shuriki.
- Jillian Rose Reed as Naomi, a new friend of Elena from the port of Avalor.
- Joseph Haro as Mateo, a royal wizard who helps Sofia.
- Keith Ferguson as Zuzo, a spiritual guide.
- André Sogliuzzo as Alacazar, a royal wizard who protected Elena from Shuriki.
- Joe Nunez as Armando, a frazzled castle servant who helps Elena on her journey to the throne.
- Ana Ortiz as Rafa, Mateo's mother and Alacazar's daughter.

== Production and release ==
Elena and the Secret of Avalor was released on November 20, 2016, on Disney Channel and Disney Junior. It received a nomination at the 69th Primetime Emmy Awards for Outstanding Animated Program.

The film had a DVD release in 2017 with three specials: two episodes of Elena of Avalor ("Royal Retreat" and "Prince Too Charming") and the music video of the song "My Time." Prior to this, a hardcover picture book by Craig Gerber, was released in October 2016.

== Songs ==
- "The Great Unknown"
- "Our Mighty Jaquin Cry"
- "The Spirit of Avalor"
- "My Time"
- "Our Time (My Time Reprise)"
- "Sofia the First!" (instrumental, end credits)

== Reception ==
The film had a mixed reception. Rachel Wagner of Rotoscopers said that although the film helps expand the world of Elena of Avalor in a "satisfying if imperfect way", has nice moments and songs, and is "entertaining," stated that movie feels "like a Sofia movie" that is "much more skewed to a younger demographic" than the series itself. Wagner praised the "nice messages about family and teamwork" while expressing disappointment at the small amount of special features. Emily Ashby of Common Sense Media was more positive, noting that while some of the film's moments "might frighten kids" they are "short-lived and easily overshadowed by the two strong female roles" (Sofia and Elena), said that the film would appeal to fans of Sofia the First and Elena of Avalor, calling the movie a "heartwarming tale," full with talking animals, songs, magic, and "sweet themes about the enduring connections among families...and doing the right thing even when it's not...easy."
