= Craig Gerber (creator) =

American executive producer and creator of children's television programming

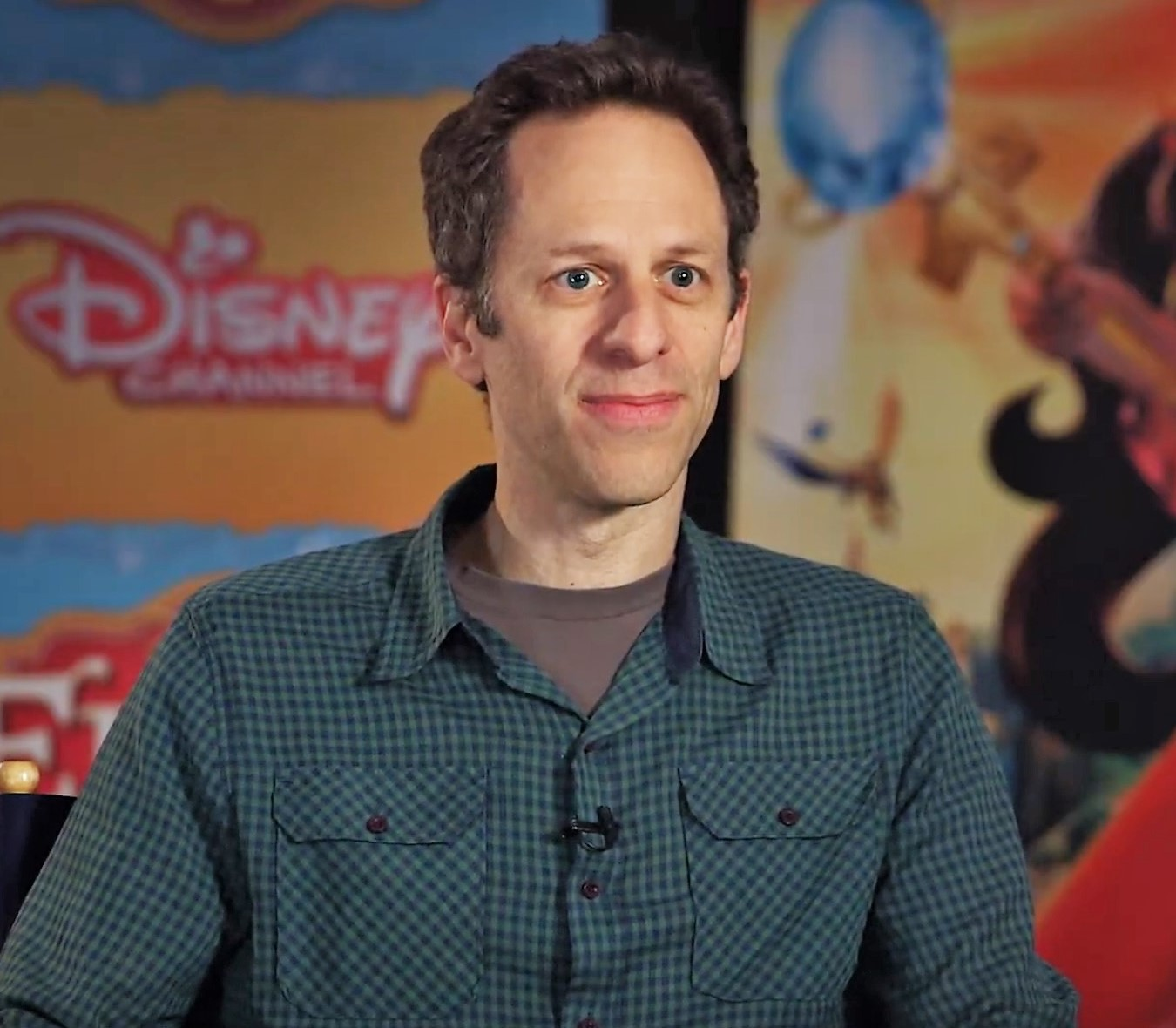
Gerber discusses his program Elena of Avalor in 2016

Craig Gerber is an American television writer and producer. He created the Disney Junior series Sofia the First (2012–2018), Elena of Avalor (2016–2020), Firebuds (2022–2025) and Sofia the First: Royal Magic (2026–present).

== Early life and education ==
Gerber was raised in outer suburban New York. His parents divorced when he was eight, and both formed new households; he has said that growing up in a stepfamily later shaped his work. Gerber is of Jewish background.

Gerber graduated from the University of Southern California School of Cinematic Arts. His short film "Hang Time" won Best Narrative Short at the Sonoma Valley Film Festival and Best Digital Short at the Sedona Film Festival in 2003. Before moving into children's television he worked on Pixie Hollow Games and wrote screenplays for Rogue Pictures, Radar Pictures and Intrepid Films.

== Career ==
Gerber was approached by Nancy Kanter of Disney Junior, who was looking for a series about a princess in childhood. The resulting show, Sofia the First, began in 2012 and ran until 2018. Gerber gave the central character a stepfather, stepbrother and stepsister, drawing on his own upbringing. He has described the character as intended to appeal to both girls and boys.

His next series, Elena of Avalor, began in 2016 and centred on Disney's first Latina princess. The fictional kingdom of Avalor was drawn from Latin American cultures generally rather than from a single country.

Disney Junior ordered Firebuds in October 2021 and the series premiered on 21 September 2022, running until 2025. It is set in a world where people live alongside talking vehicles, and follows a boy and a fire truck who want to become firefighters.

He is the owner of Electric Emu Productions, the production company that involved in many of his shows.

=== Filmmaking credits ===
- Sofia the First - 2012–2018 - creator, writer, lyricist, composer: main title theme, executive producer, and voice actor
- The Pirate Fairy - 2014 - story
- Elena of Avalor - 2016–2020 - creator, director, writer, lyricist, and executive producer
- Elena and the Secret of Avalor - 2016 - writer, story, lyricist, and executive producer
- Firebuds - 2022–2025 - creator, writer, lyricist, and executive producer
- Sofia the First: Royal Magic - 2026–present - creator, writer, lyricist, and executive producer
