= Darcy Rose Byrnes =

American and Irish actress (born 1998)

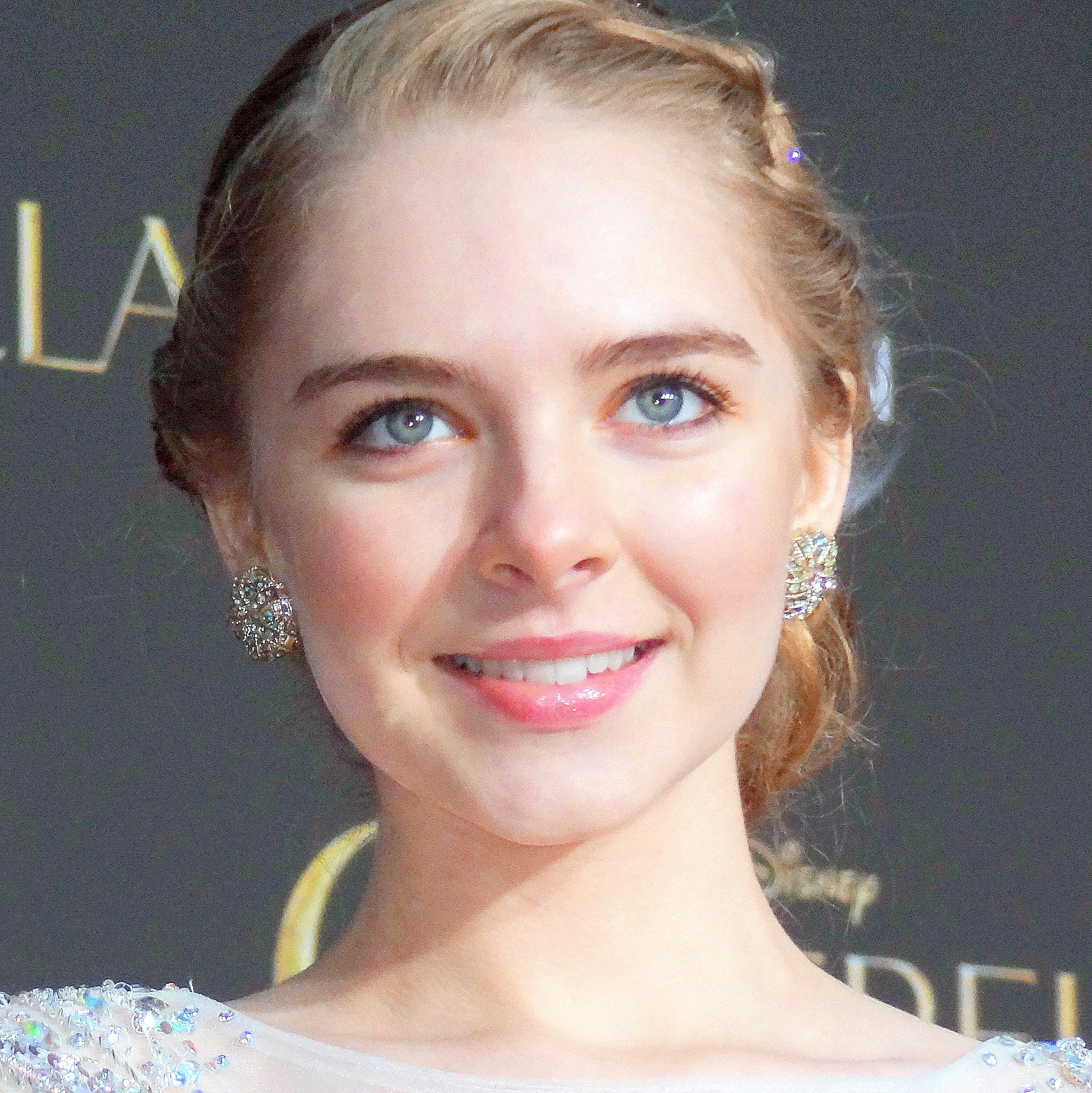
- Byrnes in 2015
- Born: November 4, 1998 (age 27); Burbank, California, U.S.
- Other name: D'Rose
- Citizenship: United States; Ireland
- Occupation: Actress
- Years active: 2000–present
- Website: www.darcyrosebyrnes.com

Darcy Rose Byrnes (born November 4, 1998) is an American and Irish actress. She is best known for her roles as Abby Newman on The Young and the Restless and The Bold and the Beautiful, Penny Scavo on Desperate Housewives, Princess Amber on Sofia the First and Elena and the Secret of Avalor, Ikki on The Legend of Korra, and Maricela in Spirit Riding Free. In addition to contributing original music to the show, Byrnes recurs in the role of Harper Schapira, in Season 1 and Season 2, on the Disney+ series Big Shot (2021/2022). In May 2024, Byrnes began her run as Mary Lane in the 25th Anniversary production of Reefer Madness: The Musical in Los Angeles. Chris Willman of Variety wrote "Byrnes is a real songbird, and literally wide-eyed in her innocence — part Mary Pickford, part Jeanette McDonald. (Eventually, she’s kind of a hopped-up Bettie Page, too.)"

== Early life ==
Byrnes was born in Burbank, California. She was homeschooled during her time on The Young and The Restless and then tested out of high school early. As she was too young to be a full-time undergraduate student, she enrolled in the eight-week Shakespeare program at the Royal Academy of Dramatic Art (RADA) in London.

== Career ==
Byrnes appeared in the direct-to-video film The Sparky Chronicles: The Map in 2003, the same year she obtained a role in the soap opera The Young and the Restless as Abby Newman from 2003 to 2008. During that time, she also had a guest starring role in The Bold and the Beautiful for 8 episodes. Byrnes also has appeared in television shows including How I Met Your Mother, Ghost Whisperer, Cold Case, Dirty Sexy Money, and House. She played Rebecca Knepp in the Hallmark television movie Amish Grace, alongside Kimberly Williams-Paisley. She played Penny Scavo in the ABC show Desperate Housewives. She also appeared in the movies Shark Swarm, Working Miracles, The Kidnapping, and A Thousand Words with Eddie Murphy.

== Filmography ==
Film and television roles
Year	Title	Role	Notes
2000	Singing Babies: Nursery Rhyme Time	Baby	Direct-to-video
2003	The Sparky Chronicles: The Map	Daughter	Direct-to-video film
2003–2008	The Young and the Restless	Abby Newman	Recurring role
2005	Without a Trace	Young Melissa	Episode: "The Innocents"
2005	1/4life	Little Sister	Unsold television pilot
2007	Cold Case	Abby Bradford (1999)	Episode: "A Dollar, a Dream"
2007	Brothers & Sisters	Gwyneth	Episode: "Game Night"
2007	The Bold and the Beautiful	Abby Newman	8 episodes
2007	1321 Clover	Tallulah	Television film
2007	The Kidnapping	Hannah McKenzie	Television film
2008	How I Met Your Mother	Lucy Zinman	5 episodes
2008	Shark Swarm	Heather	Television film
2008–2009	Dirty Sexy Money	Kiki George	3 episodes
2009	Private Practice	Gracie Rousakis	Episode: "Homeward Bound"
2009	Medium	Phoebe Burnes	Episode: "A Taste of Her Own Medicine"
2009	My Name Is Earl	Maddy	Episodes: "Witch Lady", "Pinky"
2009	House	Marika Greenwald	Episode: "The Social Contract"
2009	Ghost Whisperer	Drew Stanton	Episode: "Cursed"
2010	Healing Hands	Dawn	Television film
2010	Amish Grace	Rebecca Knepp	Television film
2010	The Land of the Astronauts	Jennifer	Television film
2010–2012	Desperate Housewives	Penny Scavo	Also starring role (seasons 6–8)
2011	A Thousand Words	10-Year-Old Girl	Film
2012	Winx Club	Elena	Voice role; Nickelodeon dub
2012–2014	The Legend of Korra	Ikki	Voice role
2012	Sofia the First: Once Upon a Princess	Princess Amber	Voice role; television film
2013–2018	Sofia the First	Princess Amber	Voice role
2016	Elena and the Secret of Avalor	Princess Amber	Voice role; television film
2017–2020	Spirit Riding Free	Maricela	Voice role
2018	Spider-Man: Into the Spider-Verse	Additional Voices	Voice role
2020	Elena of Avalor	Princess Amber	Voice role; episode: "Coronation Day"
2021	Big Shot	Harper	8 episodes
2026	Sofia the First: Royal Magic	Princess Amber	Voice role

Video games
Year	Title	Role	Notes
2014	Lightning Returns: Final Fantasy XIII	Additional Voices	
2023	Outerplane	Regina	English dub
2024	Suicide Squad: Kill the Justice League	Ivy	Replacing Tasia Valenza from previous games

== Awards and nominations ==
Year	Award	Category	Role	Result	ref
2005	Young Artist Award	Best Performance in a TV Series (Comedy or Drama) – Young Actress Age Ten or Younger	Abby Carlton in The Young and the Restless	Won	
2006	Young Artist Award	Best Performance in a Television Series (Comedy or Drama) – Guest Starring Young Actress	Abby Carlton in The Young and the Restless	Won	
2007	Young Artist Award	Best Performance in a TV Series (Comedy or Drama) – Recurring Young Actress	Abby Carlton in The Young and the Restless	Won	
2009	Young Artist Award	Best Performance in a TV Series – Recurring Young Actress	Abby Carlton in The Young and the Restless	Nominated	
2008	Young Artist Award	Best Performance in a TV Series – Guest Starring Young Actress	Abby Bradford – 1999 in Cold Case	Nominated	
