= Princess Elena =

Princess Elena can refer to:

- Elena Flores, character in the 2010s Disney Junior animated series, Elena of Avalor
- Infanta Elena, Duchess of Lugo (born 1963), person
- Princess Elena of Romania (born 1950), person
