= Tisha Custodio =

Filipino actress (born 2001)

- Born: 3 May 2001 (age 25); Bacolod, Philippines
- Occupation: Actress
- Years active: 2016–present

Tisha Custodio is a Filipino actress. She is best known for playing Carolyn "Mouse" Smith in the comedy drama series Big Shot.

== Early life ==
Custodio was born in the Philippines but moved to California at the age of 3. She fell in love with acting thanks to Lea Salongas performance in Aladdin singing A Whole New World and her audition for Miss Saigon. She attended the Orange County School of the Arts

== Career ==
Custodios biggest role so far was playing Carolyn "Mouse" Smith in Big Shot. Custodio played Andrea Miranda in the 2025 musical film And One.

== Personal life ==
Custodio is a big music fan and it helps her relax at the end of the day. She likes playing the guitar and writing songs in her freetime. Her musical influences are Sara Bareilles, Madison Cunningham and Big Thief. Custodio is vegan.

== Filmography ==
=== Film ===
Year	Title	Role	Notes
2017	Dope	Rachel	
2017	About Last Summer...	Eleanor Silva	Short
2025	And One	Andrea Miranda	

=== Television ===
Year	Title	Role	Notes
2021-2022	Big Shot	Carolyn Smith	20 episodes
