= Cricket Wampler =

American actress (born 2001)

Christina Wampler
- Born: 27 January 2001 (age 24); Tipp City, Ohio, United States
- Occupation: Actress
- Years active: 2013–present

Christina "Cricket" Wampler (born January 27, 2001) is an American actress best known for playing Samantha Finkman in the dramedy series Big Shot.

== Early life ==
She was born in Tipp City, Ohio. Wampler began acting after attending performances by her brother and sister. One evening, over dinner with their managers, Wampler was asked if she had any interest in acting. To her family’s surprise, she said yes.

== Career ==
Wampler made her screen debut in an episode of Crash & Bernstein. Early in her career, she trained as a dancer and choreographer and volunteered at Children's Hospital Los Angeles (CHLA).

Wampler's biggest role so far is as Samantha Finkman in Big Shot.

== Filmography ==
=== Film ===
Year	Title	Role	Notes
2017	The Sub	Student	Short

=== Television ===
Year	Title	Role	Notes
2013	Crash & Bernstein	Shelby	Episode: Crashy McSmartypants
2014	About a Boy	Hannah Bickleman	2 episodes
2015	Mr. Robinson	Choir student	Episode: Pilot
2021–2022	Big Shot	Samantha Finkman	20 episodes
