= The Kicks =

- Genre: Sitcom
- Created by: Alex Morgan; David Babcock
- Directed by: Elizabeth Allen Rosenbaum
- Starring: Sixx Orange; E'myri Crutchfield; Isabella Acres; Gabe Eggerling; Sophia Mitri Schloss; Monica Lacy; Tim Martin Gleason
- Opening theme: "Huddle Formation" performed by The Go! Team
- Country of origin: United States
- Original language: English
- No. of seasons: 1
- No. of episodes: 10

Production
- Executive producers: David Babcock; James Frey; Todd Cohen; Jeff Luini; Maria Melograne; Elizabeth Allen Rosenbaum
- Cinematography: Krishna Rao
- Editor: Anita Brandt-Burgoyne
- Camera setup: Single-camera
- Running time: 22 minutes
- Production companies: Amazon Studios; Basement Plays Entertainment; Full Fathom Five; Picrow

Original release
- Network: Amazon Prime Video
- Release: June 26, 2015 – September 1, 2016

The Kicks is an American sitcom created by Alex Morgan and David Babcock. Babcock also serves as executive producer alongside James Frey. The pilot premiered on Amazon Prime Video on June 26, 2015.

== Synopsis ==
Twelve-year-old soccer player Devin Burke is on the verge of being named seventh-grade captain of her Connecticut school soccer team when her family moves to California midway through the school year. Now, Devin has to rise to the challenge after discovering that her new school team has been on a losing streak over the last few months and is badly in need of a captain to rally the team together. However, disaster strikes when their coach quits, as her mother is critically ill. With no coach and two games fast approaching, the girls enlist the help of the janitor, Pablo Rivas. Pablo is hard on them but also kind, as he remembers what it was like when he was their age.

== Cast and characters ==
=== Main ===
- Sixx Orange as Devin Burke
- Isabella Acres as Mirabelle Harris
- E'myri Crutchfield as Zoe Knox
- Gabe Eggerling as Bailey Burke, Devin's younger brother
- Sophia Mitri Schloss as Emma Gelbaum
- Monica Lacy as Sharon Burke, Devin's mother
- Tim Martin Gleason as Tom Burke, Devin's father

=== Recurring ===
- Alejandro Furth as Coach Rivas
- Noah Urrea as Cody McBride
- Noemi Gonzalez as Coach Flores
- Ashley Liao as Parker
- Jane Widdop as Lily Padgett

== Production ==
The Kicks was ordered to pilot by Amazon on September 15, 2014. The show is based on the best selling book series of the same name, written by U.S. soccer star Alex Morgan, illustrated by Paula Franco. The pilot premiered on Amazon Instant Video on June 26, 2015 as a part of Amazon's fifth pilot season. Amazon ordered the pilot to series on November 6, 2015. Filming for the series began on February 22, 2016.

== Episodes ==
No.	Title	Directed by	Written by	Original release date	Prod. code
1	"Pilot"	Elizabeth Allen Rosenbaum	David Babcock	June 26, 2015	101
Devin Burke was the star player on her soccer team back home until her family moved to California. Devin rises to the challenge after discovering that her new school team has been on a losing streak and is badly in need of a leader to turn things around. A rivalry begins between Devin and her teammate, Mirabelle.
2	"There's No I In Team"	Sasie Sealy	Andrew Orenstein	August 25, 2016	TBA
Devin tries out for a high level Club Soccer team and is excited by the coach's positive feedback. Her parents won't let her play for both teams, so Devin quits The Kicks in favor of the more skilled Club team. When she doesn't make the Club roster due to being weak on her left footing, Devin has to get back in the good graces of The Kicks, whose feelings she initially hurt. Coach Flores quits, leaving The Kicks without a coach.
3	"You Win Some, You Lose Some"	Sasie Sealy	Nastaran Dibai	September 1, 2016	TBA
The Kicks find out that their coach can no longer coach them due to a family emergency, and they go on a search for a new coach. If they don't find one in time, they won't be allowed to practice and will be forced to forfeit their first game. Upon discovering a suitable candidate, Kentville's head custodian, The Kicks try to convince him to accept the position. He later accepts but states the team has weak links.
4	"Choosing Sides"	Joe Nussbaum	Marlana Hope	September 1, 2016	TBA
Coach Rivas has made it clear Zoe is the weak link on the team, so Devin takes it upon herself to improve Zoe's goalie skills. Mirabelle, in contrast, recruits a new goalie, Parker, that she's met in detention who is clearly a far better goalie than Zoe. Things come to a head when at a mandatory slumber party, Devin is forced to be a true leader and make the best choice for the team and Zoe. Ultimately, The Kicks decide that Parker will be the new goalie.
5	"Take The Field"	Joe Nussbaum	David H. Steinberg	September 1, 2016	TBA
With The Kicks' field in such poor condition, Coach Rivas is concerned for the safety of his players. After a failed fundraiser, Coach Rivas gets the idea to challenge the boys to a scrimmage, with the winner gaining full access to the nice turf field that the boys currently use. With the good field at stake, the girls train hard to prepare to play the boys. The girls, with the advantage of playing on their practice field, beat the boys and gain access to the field.
6	"Head Games"	Keith Samples	Andrew Orenstein	September 1, 2016	TBA
Devin is faced with a personal crisis when her soccer lucky headband goes missing and she starts playing terribly. She attributes all her bad luck to losing the headband, and her teammates must figure out a way to calm her nerves before The Kicks lose too many games. It is revealed that Steven stole Devin's headband in an attempt to get back at the girls' team for beating the boys. Bailey, Devin's brother, convinces Steven to give the headband back, but Devin decides the new headband the Kicks gave her means more because it came from them.
7	"Go Big or Go Home"	Keith Samples	Taylor Cox & Jacquie Walters	September 1, 2016	TBA
The Kicks' uniforms are beginning to fall apart, so Coach Rivas plans a trip to an out of town tournament for the chance to earn the team new jerseys. The Kicks are given a curfew, but Devin and Mirabelle sneak out to go inside a supposedly haunted hotel room. The two of them get stuck in the elevator and fail to make it back before the curfew.
8	"Breakaway"	Joe Nussbaum	Nastaran Dibai	September 1, 2016	TBA
Devin is getting punished at home and at school for breaking curfew. Mom and Dad take away her cell phone, computer, and TV, which leaves Bailey in charge of receiving and relaying all messages to Devin. Mirabelle is told she'll be transferring schools as her punishment. The Kicks have to scramble to make sure they don't lose their teammate for good, and her parents decide to let Mirabelle stay. The team then learns that Coach Rivas will be transferring to Pinewood.
9	"The Best Defense is a Good Offense"	Luke Matheny	Marlana Hope & David H. Steinberg	September 1, 2016	TBA
Reeling from the news of losing their coach to their rival school, Pinewood Academy, The Kicks engage in a prank war. The pranks escalate, forcing Coach Rivas to step in and deal with The Kicks' anger. At the end-of-year banquet, the girls have cooled down, and make peace with Coach Rivas. Coach Rivas in return gives a heartfelt speech and a surprise gift for the team. Devin then sneaks into the locker room and looks at her foot, which was injured while pranking Pinewood.
10	"No Pain, No Gain"	Luke Matheny	Taylor Cox & Jacquie Walters	September 1, 2016	TBA
Devin's ankle is badly hurt, but she believes that if she can keep it a secret from the team and Coach Rivas, they will allow her to play in the biggest game of the year against Pinewood Academy. In order to protect Devin, the team tells Coach Rivas about the injury, who in return decides to bench Devin for the game. Tied 2-2 with Pinewood, The Kicks are given a penalty kick in which Rivas agrees to let Devin kick after she pleads she has worked on her left footing. Devin makes the kick, winning the game, but while celebrating there is a snap from her ankle and she falls to the ground, writhing in pain, and it ends on a cliffhanger.

== Reception ==
On Amazon, 93% of all customer reviews of the pilot were five-stars, and 97% were either five-stars or four-stars. This was high enough to warrant a series order for the show.
