= Sofia the First =

American animated television series

- Genre: Fantasy; Comedy
- Created by: Craig Gerber
- Developed by: Craig Gerber
- Directed by: Jamie Mitchell
- Voices of: Ariel Winter; Darcy Rose Byrnes; Zach Callison (seasons 1–2); Tyler Merna (seasons 2–3); Nicolas Cantu (seasons 3–4); Sara Ramirez; Travis Willingham; Jess Harnell; Wayne Brady; Tim Gunn
- Theme music composer: John Kavanaugh; Craig Gerber
- Opening theme: "Sofia the First Theme Song" by: Ariel Winter; Laura Dickinson
- Ending theme: "Sofia the First Theme Song" (instrumental)
- Composer: Kevin Kliesch
- Country of origin: United States
- Original language: English
- No. of seasons: 4
- No. of episodes: 113 (list of episodes)

Production
- Executive producers: Craig Gerber; Jamie Mitchell
- Editor: Pieter Kaufman
- Running time: 22 minutes
- Production company: Disney Television Animation

Original release
- Network: Disney Junior; Disney Channel
- Release: January 11, 2013 – September 8, 2018

Related
- Sofia the First: Royal Magic; Elena of Avalor; Elena and the Secret of Avalor

Sofia the First is an American animated musical fantasy children's television series created and developed by Craig Gerber for Disney Television Animation and Disney Junior. The series follows a young peasant girl named Sofia, voiced by Ariel Winter, who becomes a princess after her mother marries the King of Enchancia. The episodes center on her adventures as she adjusts to royal life and forms friendships, including with animal companions with whom she communicates through a magical amulet that rewards or curses her depending on the goodness of her actions. In developing the series, Gerber sought to ground the fantasy setting in relatable, real-world situations; he noted that Sofia's background as the child of a single mother allowed the creative team to explore themes of adaptation and family dynamics relevant to contemporary audiences.

The pilot television movie, Sofia the First: Once Upon a Princess, premiered on November 18, 2012, on Disney Channel. The series subsequently aired from January 11, 2013, to September 8, 2018, on Disney Junior.

Sofia the First received praise for its music, animation, characters, and positive messages. It achieved some of the highest ratings for a preschool cable television series and, at its peak, became the most-watched program in its category. The series was nominated for 11 Daytime Emmy Awards, winning three, and received the 2014 Annie Award for Best General Audience Animated TV/Broadcast Production for Preschool Children. The franchise also generated a range of merchandise, including books and theme park attractions. A sequel series, titled Sofia the First: Royal Magic, premiered on May 25, 2026.

== Plot ==
Sofia and her widowed mother, Miranda, live a humble life in the kingdom of Enchancia until Miranda marries the widowed King Roland II. Suddenly becoming royalty, Sofia must adjust to life as a princess. As she adapts to her new role, she embarks on numerous adventures, bonds with her twin step-siblings Amber and James, and attends Royal Prep Academy, where Flora, Fauna and Merryweather from Sleeping Beauty serve as headmistresses.

Roland gifts Sofia the Amulet of Avalor, a powerful magical artifact that rewards her for good deeds and curses her for wrongdoing. The amulet grants her the ability to communicate with animals, leading her to befriend Clover the rabbit and the birds Mia and Robin. It also connects "all the princesses there ever were," summoning them to aid one another in times of need. Throughout the early seasons, the royal sorcerer Cedric repeatedly attempts to steal the amulet in order to overthrow the royal family and seize control of Enchancia. However, as he grows closer to Sofia, he begins to question his ambitions and ultimately confesses his plans, expressing remorse for his actions.

In the third season, Sofia's Aunt Tilly gives her a magical book that leads her to a secret library hidden within the castle. The library contains hundreds of unfinished stories, and Sofia is tasked with ensuring that each one receives a happy ending.

In the fourth season, another book transports her to the Mystic Isles, a realm above the clouds where all magic originates. After saving the Isles from the crystal master Prisma, Sofia begins training to become the Protector (Note: Beings that defend others from magical threats) of the Ever Realm. (Note: The world in which Sofia lives) Prisma later frees the imprisoned sorceress Vor using the "Wicked Nine", (Note: Nine magical items once belonging to Disney villains) despite the efforts of Sofia and the other Protectors to stop her. In the series finale, Sofia defeats Vor and formally assumes her role as the Protector of the Ever Realm.

== Cast and characters ==
- Ariel Winter as Sofia
- Darcy Rose Byrnes as Princess Amber
- Zach Callison (seasons 1–2), Tyler Merna (seasons 2–3) and Nicolas Cantu (seasons 3–4) as Prince James
- Sara Ramirez as Miranda
- Travis Willingham as King Roland II
- Jess Harnell as Cedric the Sorcerer
- Wayne Brady as Clover
- Tim Gunn as Baileywick

== Production ==
For five years, Disney writers, child-development and early-education experts and storytelling consultants worked to create a television show that would bypass stereotypes of evil stepmothers and girls requiring princes to save them. Disney also wanted it to spawn various merchandise. Craig Gerber, who was writing for the company's Tinker Bell film series, was approached by Disney Junior's Nancy Kanter to create a television series about princesses aimed at children aged two to seven. Though excited to conceive a fantasy world and Princess fairy tale, Gerber wanted the show to be both entertaining and educational, teaching children how to be better people and solutions to social problems. His son often emulated a variety of fantasy characters with whom he had little in common. In the hopes the show could be a "magic mirror" for his son, Gerber employed relatable situations into the fantasy world, which became the genesis for Princess Sofia.

As a child, Gerber lived with his single mother, her boyfriend, and his daughter, whom Gerber considered to be a de facto stepsister. As an adult, he learnt that when step-siblings and parents were involved, ordinary childhood concerns were typically amplified. Decades later, while attempting to lend a contemporary viewpoint to a fairy tale world, he had an epiphany: he considered the possibilities if Sofia was not born a princess and instead married into a royal family. Step-sisters are a common theme in fairy tales. However, having a mixed royal family that included both a father and a mother appeared to be a prime opportunity to convey stories to which modern children could connect. According to Gerber, Sofia being the child of a single mother provided to a simple method to explore themes of adaptation. He hoped for Sofia to serve as a good role model in a society where many young girls desire to be princesses, demonstrating attributes and learning skills that young girls (and boys) could remember long after. Gerber planned to reference multicultural family dynamics as well.

Tim Mertens, the editor of Tangled (2010), recommended Kevin Kliesch, who helped with the film, to Disney Channel as a composer for Sofia the First. The network was positive towards his background, and he booked the job. Kliesch was usually given one to two weeks to write the music, meaning he had to compose for at least three minutes a day to meet this deadline. The score draws upon the rich orchestral sound of prior Disney films, since the producers hoped to avoid "typical cartoon music". Similarly, in the original songs, Gerber and the composer included aspects of Motown, jazz, hip-hop and Broadway, rather than "cloying kiddie sounds".

== Episodes ==
Season	Episodes	Originally released	
Season	Episodes	First released	Last released
Pilot		November 18, 2012	
1	25	January 11, 2013	February 14, 2014
2	30	March 7, 2014	August 12, 2015
3	28	August 5, 2015	March 31, 2017
4	30	April 28, 2017	September 8, 2018

== Release ==
=== Broadcast ===
The series pilot—the television film Once Upon a Princess—premiered on Disney Channel on November 18, 2012. The series itself premiered on January 11, 2013; the show aired on Disney Channel during its Disney Jr. block, in addition to the 24-hour channel Disney Junior. Sofia the First was renewed for a second season two months later. In November, the series aired the special "The Floating Palace". Its first season concluded on February 14, 2014. On January 8, 2014, the series was renewed for its third season. The second season premiered on March 7, 2014, and concluded on August 12, 2015, with a primetime special, titled "The Curse of Princess Ivy", airing on November 23, 2014. On April 14, 2015, the series was renewed for its fourth and final season by Disney Junior, which began its broadcast on April 28, 2017. The extended series finale special, "Forever Royal", aired on September 8, 2018.

=== Home media and streaming ===
The series premiere episode, titled "Just One of the Princes", was made available on several platforms, including Disney Channel SVOD and iTunes, on January 4, 2013, a week before its airdate. Sofia the First was streamable on Netflix; its second and fourth seasons were made available in January 2016 and October 2018, respectively. The show was moved to Disney+ after its Netflix contract expired. In October 2022, the series was released on Disney+ in the United States. Disney has also released several episodes on DVD, including "The Floating Palace", "The Curse of Princess Ivy", and the television film Once Upon a Princess.

== Reception ==
=== Critical reception ===
Sofia the First has received generally positive reviews. In May 2020, Time Out named it one of the 30 best children's cartoons. The show's animation and music received praise. IndieWire's Greg Ehrbar commended the fluidity in the cinematography and computer animation; Emily Ashby of Common Sense Media said the "crisp animation ... brings ... Sofia and a well-rounded supporting cast [to life]". The two praised the music as "lively" and "tuneful", respectively, with Ehrbar comparing the "lavishly orchestrated" score to that of a Disney animated feature.

Critics lauded the characters. Ashby referred to Sofia as a "[s]punky, well-rounded princess", praising her influence on other characters and requests for advice when needed. She also thought the supporting cast displayed positive traits, such as loyalty, honesty, and friendship. Matt Villano, who writes for Today, enjoyed the titular character's villager friends, whom he believe emulate real-life modern teenagers. Ashby and Villano were positive towards Sofia the First's themes.

=== U.S. television ratings ===
According to Dade Hayes, the executive editor of trade publication Broadcasting & Cable, the show was deemed "risky", as it mostly aims to entertain rather than educate. Sofia the First: Once Upon a Princess premiered on Disney Channel on November 18, 2012, garnering 8.17 million viewers (when the Live+7 ratings were tabulated), which made it the number one cable TV telecast of all time for kids 2–5 and girls 2–5. It also set a record for the number one preschool cable TV telecast ever in total viewers and for adults 18–49. The January 2013 series premiere was watched by 2.7 million people, making it the second highest-rated weekday preschool cable debut since August 2000. (Note: It was behind Mickey Mouse Clubhouse's premiere, which received 2.8 million viewers.) It also became the highest-rated preschool show premiere categories of kids aged 2–5, (Note: Tied with Doc McStuffins's premiere) girls aged 2–5, adults aged 18–49, and women aged 18–49. By March 2013, Sofia the First was cable television's most-viewed preschool program; The New York Times described the show as "a monster-size new hit". In 2014, "The Curse of Princess Ivy" became the series second highest-rated telecast, garnering an average of approximately 4.7 million viewers. Across all television, it was the number one telecast for children and girls aged 2–5 at the time of broadcast.

=== Awards and nominations ===
Awards and nominations received by Sofia the First
Organization	Year	Category	Recipient(s)/Nominee(s)	Result	Ref.
Annie Awards	2014	Best General Audience Animated TV/Broadcast Production For Preschool Children	Sofia the First	Won	
Annie Awards	2014	Outstanding Achievement, Music in an Animated TV/Broadcast Production	Kevin Kliesch, Craig Gerber, and John Kavanaugh	Nominated	
Daytime Emmy Awards	2014	Outstanding Pre-School Children's Animated Program	Sofia the First	Nominated	
Daytime Emmy Awards	2014	Outstanding Writing in a Pre-School Animated Program	Doug Cooney, Laurie Israel, Erica Rothschild, Rachel Ruderman, and Craig Gerber	Nominated	
Daytime Emmy Awards	2014	Outstanding Casting for an Animated Series or Special	Brian Mathias	Nominated	
Daytime Emmy Awards	2014	Outstanding Music Direction and Composition	Kevin Kliesch	Nominated	
Daytime Emmy Awards	2014	Outstanding Original Song	Craig Gerber (lyrics) and John Kavanaugh (lyrics and composition) (for "I Belong")	Nominated	
Daytime Emmy Awards	2014	Outstanding Original Song – Main Title and Promo	Craig Gerber (lyrics) and John Kavanaugh (lyrics and composition)	Won	
Daytime Emmy Awards	2015	Outstanding Performer in an Animated Program	Megan Mullally (for "The Enchanted Feast")	Nominated	
Daytime Emmy Awards	2015	Outstanding Music Direction and Composition	Kevin Kliesch	Won	
Daytime Emmy Awards	2016	Outstanding Casting for an Animated Series or Special	Brian Mathias	Nominated	
Daytime Emmy Awards	2017	Outstanding Sound Mixing in a Preschool Animated Program	Timothy J. Borquez and Nicholas Gotten III	Won	
Daytime Emmy Awards	2017	Outstanding Music Direction and Composition	Kevin Kliesch	Nominated	
Daytime Emmy Awards	2018	Outstanding Music Direction and Composition	Kevin Kliesch	Nominated	
Daytime Emmy Awards	2019	Outstanding Original Song in a Children's or Animated Program	Craig Gerber (lyrics) and John Kavanaugh (composition) (for "For One and All")	Nominated	
Primetime Emmy Awards	2014	Outstanding Music and Lyrics	Craig Gerber (lyrics) and John Kavanaugh (Composition) (for "Merroway Cove")	Nominated	
Primetime Emmy Awards	2015	Outstanding Music Composition for a Limited Series, Movie, or Special (Original Dramatic Score)	Kevin Kliesch (for "The Curse of Princess Ivy")	Nominated	
Humanitas Prize	2017	Children's Animation	Laurie Israel and Rachel Ruderman (for "Dads and Daughters Day")	Won	
Humanitas Prize	2018	Children's Animation	Craig Carlisle (for "The Crown of Blossoms")	Nominated	
TCA Awards	2016	Outstanding Achievement in Youth Programming	Sofia the First	Nominated	
TCA Awards	2018	Outstanding Achievement in Youth Programming	Sofia the First	Nominated	
Young Artist Awards	2015	Best Performance in a Voice-over Role – Young Actor	Joshua Carlon	Nominated	
Young Artist Awards	2019	Best Performance in a Voice-over Role – Teen Artist	Nicolas Cantu	Nominated	

=== Controversy ===
During a press tour in October 2012, a producer identified Sofia as a Latina. The announcement drew both praise and criticism from media outlets. Latinos and fans saw it as a new milestone for Disney and lauded the choice of a light skin tone for a Latina character. Others were critical that she did not have any cultural signifiers or ethnic identity and believed a darker skin tone would better represent the Latina community. A Disney Junior general manager later clarified: "Sofia is a fairytale girl who lives in a fairytale world. All our characters come from fantasy lands that may reflect elements of various cultures and ethnicities but none are meant to specifically represent those real world cultures". According to a Disney spokeswoman, Sofia has a mixed fairy-tale heritage; her mother and father are from Galdiz (which is based on Spain) and Freezenburg (which is based on Scandinavia), respectively.

== Other media ==
=== Spin-offs and sequels ===
==== Elena of Avalor ====
Following the controversy regarding Sofia's ethnicity, Gerber noticed the demand for a Latina princess; the idea "bubbled in [his] mind" and partially inspired the creation of the spin-off series Elena of Avalor, which stars a Latina princess as its titular character. She is introduced in Sofia the First special episode Elena and the Secret of Avalor, in which Sofia discovers that Elena has been trapped inside her amulet for decades because of an invasion of Avalor by the evil sorceress Shuriki. Sofia and her family travel to Avalor to free Elena and restore the kingdom.

==== Royal Magic ====
In November 2022, it was reported that Gerber had expanded his overall development deal with Disney Branded Television, under which he began developing a sequel series to Sofia the First.

In August 2024, Disney Jr. announced that the sequel series, titled Sofia the First: Royal Magic, had been greenlit for a 2026 premiere.

In February 2026, the series was given a premiere window of May 2026, with an official premiere date of May 25 announced in April 2026. The first eight episodes were released on Disney+ the following day, May 26, 2026.

The series will feature Auliʻi Cravalho reprising her role as Moana and Aimee Carrero as Princess Elena Castillo Flores. Recurring appearances by Rapunzel, Cinderella, Aurora, and Jasmine were also announced.

=== Merchandising ===
In January 2013, Disney Press published a hardcover picture book based on the series, which entered The New York Times Best Seller list, with approximately 450,000 copies sold. Most mainstream merchandise was first released from March to June of that year; the products immediately became best-sellers. At Toys "R" Us, the show's merchandise proved to be some of the most popular toys from June to September. In 2013, merchandise related to Sofia the First and two other Disney Junior shows—Jake and the Neverland Pirates and Doc McStuffins—generated retails sales of $1.8 billion globally. The series was part of the Disney Junior – Live on Stage! at Disney's Hollywood Studios as well as Disney California Adventure. Disney Junior Dance Party on Tour, a tour featuring a 90-minute concert, also includes Sofia the First.

== See also ==
- Disney Princess
