= Sadie (film) =

- Film poster
- Directed by: Megan Griffiths
- Screenplay by: Megan Griffiths
- Produced by: Lacey Leavitt; Jennessa West
- Starring: Sophia Mitri Schloss; Melanie Lynskey; Danielle Brooks; Tony Hale; John Gallagher Jr.
- Cinematography: T.J. Williams Jr.
- Edited by: Celia Beasley
- Music by: Mike McCready
- Release date: March 10, 2018 (SXSW)
- Running time: 96 minutes
- Country: United States
- Language: English

Sadie is a 2018 American independent drama film. Written and directed by Megan Griffiths, it stars Melanie Lynskey, Danielle Brooks, Tony Hale, John Gallagher Jr., and Sophia Mitri Schloss. It began a limited theatrical run on October 12, 2018, receiving positive reviews from critics, particularity for the performances of Lynskey and Schloss.

== Plot ==
Adolescent Sadie lives with her mother Rae in a trailer park. Sadie's soldier father has already been away for four years, and has just reenlisted. He and Sadie exchange handwritten letters every couple of weeks. Sadie is upset, and wants her parents to be together again when her father returns from the war; Rae seems disappointed only for Sadie's sake.

Rae's best friend of twenty years is Carla. Francis and self-described "old coot" Deak are Carla's son and father, and also Sadie's two best friends. Sadie feels protective of Francis, who is struggling with a bully problem at school. Deak is an ever-present sympathetic ear for the trailer park, and particularly Sadie.

Although Rae has largely given up on her soldier husband, she has remained loyal to him. Her friend Bradley, who is also Sadie's school counselor, is hoping for Rae to change her mind, but she is only interested in him as a friend. However, Rae finds her new neighbor Cyrus more tempting.

== Cast ==
- Sophia Mitri Schloss as Sadie
- Melanie Lynskey as Rae
- John Gallagher Jr. as Cyrus
- Danielle Brooks as Carla
- Tony Hale as Bradley
- Keith L. Williams as Francis
- Tee Dennard as Deak
- Justin Thomas Howell as Jesse Durantz
- Tony Doupe as Dr. Ross
- David Leo Schultz as Randall
- Joseph Steven Yang as Mr. Lee
- Claudine Mboligikpelani Nako as Miss Kendell
- Wally Dalton as Jimmy
- Benjamin Camp as Ticket Taker
- John Paulsen as Rick
- Jason Adkins as Driver
- Cortney Anderson-Sanford as Grocery Clerk
- Hersh Powers as Student

== Release ==
Sadie premiered at the 2018 South by Southwest Film Festival. It also showed at the Seattle International Film Festival on May 27, 2018.

== Reception ==
On review aggregator website Rotten Tomatoes, the film holds an approval rating of 79%, based on 38 reviews, with an average rating of 6.9/10. The site's critical consensus reads, "Led by a potentially starmaking turn from Sophia Mitri Schloss, Sadie's family ties bind viewers into a uniquely disquieting drama."
