= Sophia Mitri Schloss =

American actress

- Born: December 15, 2002 (age 22); Seattle, Washington, United States
- Occupation: Actress
- Years active: 2010–present

Sophia Mitri Schloss is an American actress. She is best known for playing the lead in the drama film Sadie, as well as Emma Korn in the comedy drama series Big Shot.

== Early life ==
Schloss was born in Seattle, Washington. She did not watch any television growing up but said that her parents were great storytellers. She was part of a few local productions and studio films. When she was seven she met Trice Koopman who is still her manager. She was in a jazz choir at her high school.

== Career ==
Schloss' first appearance on television came in the pilot episode of the drama series Grimm. Schlosss first recurring role came when she played Emma Gelbaum in The Kicks.

Schloss played the lead role in a film for the first when she played the titular character Sadie in Sadie. Her most well known role so far in her career so far is as Emma Korn in Big Shot.

== Personal life ==
As well as being an actress Schloss is also a musician. She plays guitar as well as singing and songwriting. She also considers herself a nature enthusiast.

== Filmography ==
=== Film ===
Year	Title	Role	Notes
2010	The Match Girl	Young Emily	Short
2012	I Am Zozo	Young Tess	
2012	Switchmas	Karate Don Fan	
2012	Isabel	Isabel Lorenz	
2014	Desert Cathedral	Samantha Collins	
2017	Lane 1974	Lane	
2018	Sadie	Sadie	
2021	Potato Dreams of America	Mandy	

=== Television ===
Year	Title	Role	Notes
2011	Grimm	Robin Howell	Episode: "Pilot"
2015	The Librarians	Jamie	Episode: "And the Fables of Doom"
2015-2016	The Kicks	Emma Gelbaum	10 episodes
2017	Portlandia	Stella	Episode: "Amore"
2021–2022	Big Shot	Emma Korn	20 episodes
