= Big Shot (TV series) =

American sports comedy drama television series

- Genre: Comedy drama; Sports
- Created by: David E. Kelley; Dean Lorey; Brad Garrett
- Starring: John Stamos; Jessalyn Gilsig; Richard Robichaux; Sophia Mitri Schloss; Nell Verlaque; Tiana Le; Monique Green; Tisha Custodio; Cricket Wampler; Yvette Nicole Brown; Sara Echeagaray
- Music by: Fil Eisler and Alexis Grapsas
- Country of origin: United States
- Original language: English
- No. of seasons: 2
- No. of episodes: 20

Production
- Executive producers: Brad Garrett; Bill D'Elia; Dean Lorey; David E. Kelley
- Producers: Tommy Burns; Jacquie Walters; P. Todd Coe; Chris Marrs; Michael Petok
- Cinematography: Alison Kelly; Michael A. Price; James R. Bagdonas
- Editors: John David Buxton; Katheryn Rupert; Annie De Brock; Kristen Young
- Running time: 29–53 minutes
- Production companies: David E. Kelley Productions; Lorey Stories; ABC Signature

Original release
- Network: Disney+
- Release: April 16, 2021 – October 12, 2022

Big Shot is an American sports comedy-drama television series created by David E. Kelley, Dean Lorey and Brad Garrett for Disney+ starring John Stamos, Jessalyn Gilsig, and Yvette Nicole Brown.

The series premiered on April 16, 2021. In September 2021, the series was renewed for a second season, which premiered on October 12, 2022. In February 2023, the series was cancelled after two seasons.

The series was removed from Disney+ on May 26, 2023, amidst a Disney+ and Hulu content removal purge as part of a broader cost cutting initiative under Disney CEO Bob Iger.

== Premise ==
The series follows Marvyn Korn, a temperamental basketball coach who is fired from his job at the University at Wisconsin and relocates to California to coach a girls' basketball team at Westbrook School, an elite girls' high school.

== Cast and characters ==
=== Main ===
- John Stamos as Marvyn Korn, a temperamental basketball coach who coaches at Westbrook School for Girls in San Diego, California
- Jessalyn Gilsig as Holly Barrett, the Westbrook Sirens' good natured down-to-earth assistant coach and a biology teacher at the school
- Richard Robichaux as George Pappas (season 1), the school counselor at Westbrook School for Girls
- Sophia Mitri Schloss as Emma Korn, Marvyn's teenage daughter
- Nell Verlaque as Louise Gruzinsky, the Westbrook Sirens' star player and point guard. The school's gym was named after her family.
- Tiana Le as Destiny Winters, the Westbrook Sirens' power forward. Because she lost her father several years ago, she forms a bond with Coach Korn.
- Monique Green as Olive Cooper (season 1), a Westbrook Sirens player who is obsessed with using social media. She doesn't come from a wealthy family.
- Tisha Custodio as Carolyn "Mouse" Smith, a Westbrook Sirens' player who comes from a military background
- Cricket Wampler as Samantha Finkman, the Westbrook Sirens' shooting guard
- Yvette Nicole Brown as Sherilyn Thomas, the no-nonsense dean of Westbrook School for Girls
- Sara Echeagaray as Ava (season 2), a former star volleyball player who comes to Westbrook after washing out of her sport in a manner similar to Coach Korn

=== Recurring ===
- Toks Olagundoye as Terri Grint (season 1), a political science teacher at Westbrook School for Girls who values academics over sports
- Emery Kelly as Dylan (season 1), Louise's best friend
- Darcy Rose Byrnes as Harper Schapira, an intense journalist at the school, Miss Goodwyn's daughter, and Mouse's love interest
- Dale Whibley as Lucas Gruzinsky, Louise's older brother and Emma's initial love interest
- Kathleen Rose Perkins as Miss Goodwyn (season 1), the drama teacher and drama club advisor at Westbrook School for Girls and Harper's mother
- Daisha Graf as Angel (season 1), Destiny's aunt who is secretly her biological mother
- Damian Alonso as Jake Matthews (season 1), a Carlsbad Cobras player and Olive's love interest
- Camryn Manheim as Coach McCarthy, the head coach of Westbrook Sirens' rival team Carlsbad Cobras
- Keala Settle as Christina Winters (season 1), Destiny's mother who is actually her aunt
- Charlie Hall as Nick Russo (season 2) Louise and Ava's love interest. His family went bankrupt due to the embezzling of Louise's father, Larry Gruzinski.
- Samuel-Taylor as Trevor Thomas (season 2), Sherilyn's son and Destiny's love interest
- Stony Blyden as Jackson Hoover (season 2), Emma's love interest, who turns out to be a bad influence as he constantly gets her into trouble for his actions

=== Special guest stars ===
- Tony Kornheiser as himself (season 1)
- Michael Wilbon as himself (season 1)
- Stan Verrett as himself (season 2)

== Episodes ==
=== Series overview ===
Season	Episodes	Originally released	
Season	Episodes	First released	Last released
1	10	April 16, 2021	June 18, 2021
2	10	October 12, 2022	

=== Season 1 (2021) ===
No. overall	No. in season	Title	Directed by	Written by	Original release date
1	1	"Pilot"	Bill D'Elia	Teleplay by : David E. Kelley & Dean Lorey; Story by : David E. Kelley & Dean Lorey & Brad Garrett	April 16, 2021
Marvyn Korn is a former NCAA Division 1 basketball coach who has been fired for throwing a chair at a referee. After this he is forced to accept a job coaching high school basketball at the all girls private Westbrook School in southern California. Korn meets the straightlaced headmistress Sherilyn Thomas and the good-natured assistant coach Holly Barrett. He also meets the players, including the talented and cocky Louise Gruzinsky whom Korn suspends for back talk, running afoul of her wealthy father who has arranged for Korn to get the job so he could train Louise. Korn later has an emotional talk with Louise, who reveals that her father is putting immense pressure on her to get a basketball scholarship. Because there will be scouts at the upcoming game, Korn allows Louise to dress for it but not to play. In the closing minute with the Sirens trailing, Korn puts Louise in at Barrett's urging. Louise's efforts fall short, but Korn is pleased with the team. Thomas gives Korn some words of encouragement. That evening, we learn that Korn has a teen-aged daughter who lives in another city.
2	2	"The Marvyn Korn Effect"	Bill D'Elia	Alyson Fouse	April 23, 2021
Marvyn increases practice to two-a-days. Westbrook's intimidating English teacher, Terri Grint, who doesn't like Marvyn's presence at the school, schedules a mandatory class at the same time as Marvyn's pre-game practice. The issue is brought to Dean Thomas, who sides with Marvyn. Looking for a way to push back, Terri informs Sherilyn that Marvyn is holding two-a-day practices. School rules force Marvyn to go back to one-a-day practices. Marvyn complies with the rules, but when he tells the team they'll be returning to one-a-day practices, he doesn't explain why. Confused, the team, led by Louise, press Holly for a reason, and learn that it wasn't Marvyn's decision. The following morning, during Marvyn's daily jog, he sees the entire team, at the public basketball court, practicing with Holly. Knowing they did this to continue the two-a-day practice regime, he coaches the team unofficially, off campus. Later on, Marvyn tells his daughter that she can move to California with him.
3	3	"TCKS"	Ron Underwood	Cary Bickley	April 30, 2021
Marvyn tells the team that they will be aiming for Division 2 by the end of the year. After dropping his daughter, Emma, at his hotel, Marvyn hurries to the practice where Harper interviews the teams and coach for the school website. Meanwhile Emma goes out on a house hunt where she meets a boy who later turns out to be Louise's elder brother Lucas. She enters into an argument with Miss Grint on her first day at school which impresses the girls and she starts bonding with them. Marvyn and Emma attend his father's funeral and receives a hug from the girls on returning to practice. They finally move out of the hotel to a beach house.
4	4	"Great in the Living Room"	Bola Ogun	Chris Marrs	May 7, 2021
Harper releases an expose on Coach Marvyn portraying him as a sensitive man; the video goes viral on the campus. Sherilyn forces Emma to join Miss Goodwins play. Olive signs an influencer deal with a swimsuit brand but later slanders it on a video. The company threatens to sue Olive for defamation and her parents, who are not from a wealthy background, decide to pull her out of Westbrook because they think the Westbrook culture is ruining their daughter. Marvyn tries to recruit star player Savannah with a full scholarship but later pulls his offer and instead gives the scholarship to Olive, convincing her parents to let her stay.
5	5	"This Is Our House"	Viet Nguyen	Leslie Schapira	May 14, 2021
6	6	"Carlsbad Crazies"	Ron Underwood	Jacquie Walters	May 21, 2021
7	7	"Kalm Korn"	Barbara Brown	Kim Newton	May 28, 2021
8	8	"Everything to Me"	Ron Underwood	Erin Weller & Kate Heckman	June 4, 2021
9	9	"Beth MacBeth"	Barbara Brown	Arielle Díaz	June 11, 2021
10	10	"Marvyn's Playbook"	Bill D'Elia	Wendy Mericle & John R. Montgomery	June 18, 2021

=== Season 2 (2022) ===
No. overall	No. in season	Title	Directed by	Written by	Original release date
11	1	"Ava Fever"	Bill D'Elia	Melanie Kirschbaum & Alexandra Decas	October 12, 2022
12	2	"BOYS!"	Ron Underwood	Jenniffer Gómez	October 12, 2022
13	3	"Tipoff"	Viet Nguyen	Chris Marrs	October 12, 2022
14	4	"17 Candles"	Ruba Nadda	Leslie Schapira	October 12, 2022
15	5	"Field Day"	Ken Whittingham	Brittney Jeng & Dom Woolridge	October 12, 2022
16	6	"It's Going to Be Okay"	Nimisha Mukerji	Dean Lorey & Leslie Schapira	October 12, 2022
17	7	"Playing House"	Barbara Brown	Philip Hoover & Kate Zasowski	October 12, 2022
18	8	"Prom!"	Daniel Willis	Melanie Kirschbaum & Alexandra Decas	October 12, 2022
19	9	"Parent Trap"	Barbara Brown	Jenniffer Gómez & Abigail Jensen	October 12, 2022
20	10	"Moving On"	Bill D'Elia	Dean Lorey & Vanessa McCarthy	October 12, 2022

== Production ==
=== Development ===
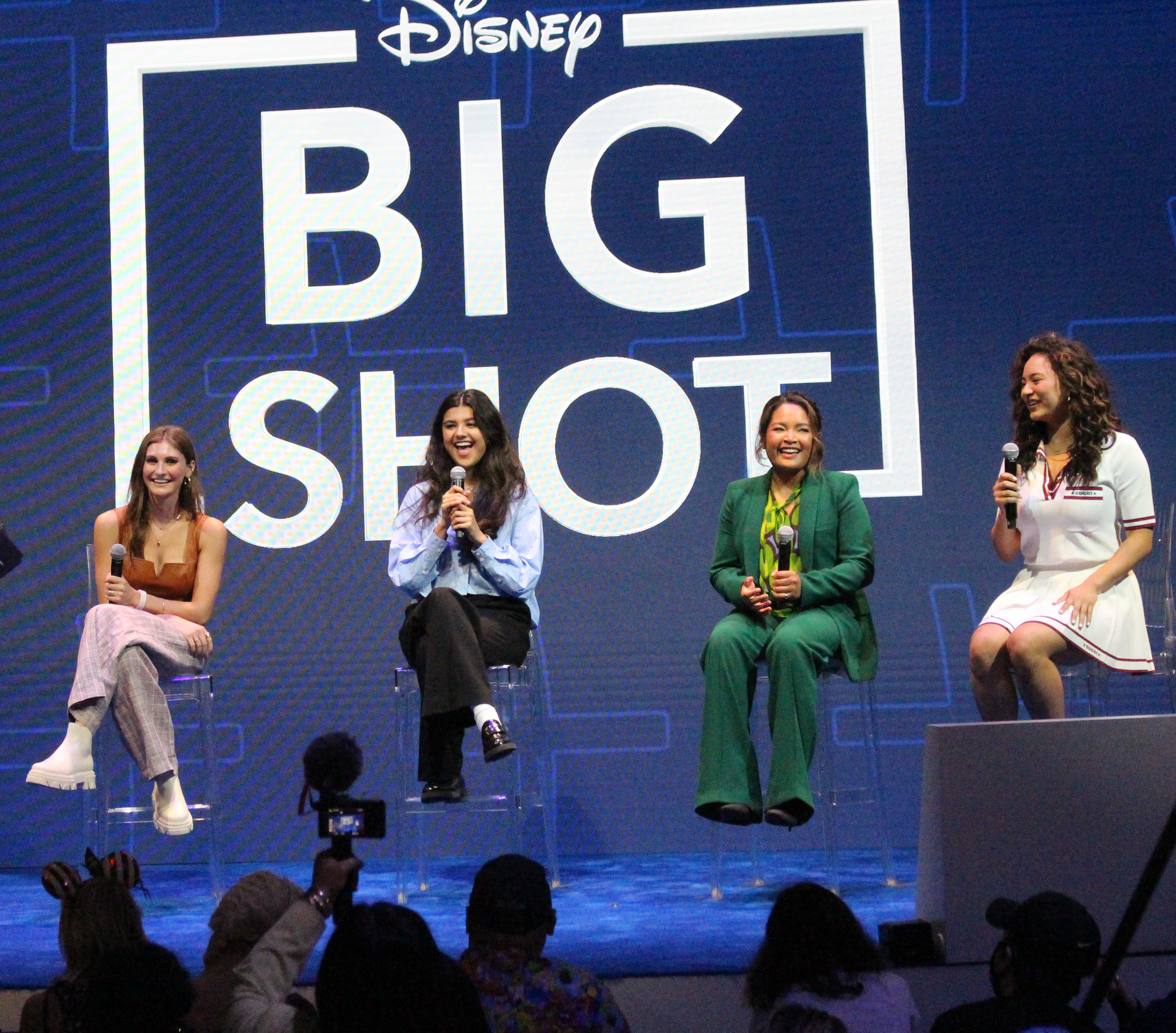
Cast members appearing at D23 Expo 2022

In October 2019, Disney+ ordered a ten-episode hour-long comedy-drama based on an original idea by Brad Garrett, who pitched the idea to David E. Kelley and developed it along with Dean Lorey. The trio along with Bill D'Elia were to executive produce with ABC Signature acting as the Production house. Lorey was to write the script and D'Elia to direct the first episode. On September 2, 2021, Disney+ renewed the series for a second season. On February 17, 2023, Disney+ cancelled the series after two seasons.

=== Casting ===
With the announcement of the series in October 2019 it was revealed that John Stamos had been cast in the lead role. In late October, the casting of the series regulars were released, attaching Shiri Appleby as assistant coach and Yvette Nicole Brown as dean of the school, along with Richard Robichaux as George, Sophia Mitri Schloss as Emma, Nell Verlaque as Louise, Tiana Le as Destiny, Monique Green as Olive Cooper, Tisha Custodio as Carolyn "Mouse" Smith, and Cricket Wampler as Samantha Finkman. In late January 2020, it was revealed that Jessalyn Gilsig had replaced Shiri Appleby as Holly to make the character a contemporary to Stamos' role. On November 19, 2020, Keala Settle and Emery Kelly were cast in recurring roles. On April 30, 2021, Camryn Manheim, Daisha Graf, and Dale Whibley were cast in recurring roles. On May 13, 2021, it was reported that Darcy Rose Byrnes was set to recur while Marla Gibbs was cast to guest star. On August 15, 2022, Charlie Hall joined the cast in a recurring capacity for the second season.

=== Filming ===
Principal photography for Big Shot began in November 2019 in Los Angeles. In March 2020, production was suspended due to the COVID-19 pandemic. Production for the series also shut down for a day in November after a COVID-19 test that resulted in being a negative, and for the rest of 2020 in December after a COVID-19 test that resulted in being a positive. Filming resumed in early January 2021, but was paused again at the end of the month after a second positive COVID-19 test. Filming then resumed two weeks later. Production for the second season began in early 2022.

== Release ==
The series premiered on April 16, 2021, released weekly on Fridays. The second season was released on October 12, 2022.

== Reception ==
=== Critical response ===
Review aggregator Rotten Tomatoes reported an approval rating of 78% based on 23 critic reviews, with an average rating of 6.6/10. The website's critics consensus reads, "Big Shot struggles to find much new to say, but it boasts strong performances, a sweet disposition, and, with a little perseverance, could become a show worth rooting for." Metacritic gave the series a weighted average score of 65 out of 100 based on 11 critic reviews, indicating "generally favorable reviews".

Jen Chaney of Vulture appreciated the series for its depiction of a basketball team composed of female players instead of male players, stating it portrays some of the obstacles women can face in sport, and complimented the performances of the cast, especially John Stamos and Tiana Le's, while giving a positive take on the development of Stamos' character through his relationships. Daniel Fienberg of The Hollywood Reporter appreciated the show for its avoidance of easy punchlines by not providing clichés compared to some other sitcoms, praised the characterization and development of Stamos' character, while complimenting performances of the cast and the chemistry between the characters, but stated that the series does not develop some characters enough. Joel Keller of Decider praised the performances of the cast, especially Stamos, stating the actor manages to provide the mannerisms of an intense coach, while saying that the series stays well written despite being predictable at times. Joyce Slaton of Common Sense Media rated the series 4 out of 5 stars, praised the depiction of positive messages, such as perseverance and teamwork, and complimented the presence of positive role models, citing with John Stamos and Jessalyn Gilsi's characters for the advice and lessons they provide to other characters. Pradeep Menon of Firstpost rated the series 3 out of 5 stars, found the show refreshing for its quick resolution of dramatic moments, complimented the performances of the cast members, and appreciated the depiction of same-sex romance as regular relationships. Kristen Lopez of IndieWire gave the show a C+ rating, praised the performances of the cast members, especially Stamos, and complimented Big Shot for avoiding clichés, but found that the series does not develop some characters enough, while stating that the script sometimes feels old-fashioned.

=== Accolades ===
Year	Award	Category	Nominee(s)	Result	Ref.
2021	Hollywood Critics Association Television Awards	Best Supporting Actress in a Streaming Series	Yvette Nicole Brown	Nominated	
