= Sara Echeagaray =

American actress (born 2001)

- Born: 4 October 2001 (age 24); Edinburg, Texas, United States
- Occupation: Actress
- Years active: 2021–present

Sara Echeagaray is an American actress. She is best known for playing Ava Navarro in the dramedy series Big Shot.

== Early life ==
Echeagaray was born in Edinburg, Texas. She grew up in McAllen, Texas, and dreamed of becoming an actress. She moved to Las Vegas as a teen. Her passion for acting began in middle school when she was the lead in the school musical Royal T. High, a show created by her choir teacher.

== Career ==
Echeagaray achieved notoriety online before she became an actress. She started doing videos on social media due to not being able to go to high school due to the COVID-19 pandemic.

Echeagarays biggest role so far was in Big Shot.

Echeagaray has over 8 million followers on TikTok. She has her own YouTube channel which has amassed over 1.2 million subscribers.

== Filmography ==
=== Film ===
Year	Title	Role	Notes
2021	Treat	Shannon	

=== Television ===
Year	Title	Role	Notes
2022	Big Shot	Ava Navarro	10 episodes
2023-2024	Epic Career Quest	Mila	5 episodes
2025	(Un)Likeminded: A Sci-Fi Audio Anthology	Choir student	Episode: "The Power Within"
