= List of Sofia the First episodes =

Sofia the First is an American animated television series that incorporates characters from the Disney Princess franchise. The series stars Ariel Winter as Sofia, a young girl who becomes a princess when her mother, Miranda, marries King Roland II of the kingdom of Enchancia.

On April 14, 2015, the series was renewed for a fourth season by Disney Junior, which released on April 28, 2017.

The series finale aired on Disney Junior on September 8, 2018.

== Episodes ==
Season	Episodes	Originally released	
Season	Episodes	First released	Last released
Pilot		November 18, 2012	
1	25	January 11, 2013	February 14, 2014
2	30	March 7, 2014	August 12, 2015
3	28	August 5, 2015	March 31, 2017
4	30	April 28, 2017	September 8, 2018

=== Pilot (2012) ===
Title	Directed by	Written by	Original release date	U.S. viewers (millions)
"Sofia the First: Once Upon a Princess"	Jamie Mitchell	Craig Gerber	November 18, 2012	5.15
The pilot movie introduces Sofia, the daughter of a shoe shop owner named Miranda. Both of them have been living merrily together in the kingdom of Enchancia for as long as Sofia can remember. On a fateful day, she and her mother are called to the castle to assist King Roland II for a shoe-fitting, who soon marries her mother, crowning her Enchancia's new Queen and Sofia as its new princess. With the help of Flora, Fauna, and Merryweather from Walt Disney's Sleeping Beauty, now headmistresses at a school for royalty known as Royal Preparatory Academy, Sofia tries to adjust to royal life. She is also given a beautiful purple amulet as a welcoming gift, while making a solemn oath to never take it off, soon realizing that it is in fact the power of the Amulet of Avalor that grants her magical powers, such as the ability to talk to and understand animals. However, this amulet is craved by the kingdom's royal sorcerer Cedric, who wants to use its power to take over Enchancia. Combined with the pressures of royal life and fitting into a new school, Sofia has to deal with her jealous stepsister Amber, who feels that her father loves Sofia over her. King Roland soon announces a welcoming ball for Sofia, where she has to dance in front of everyone. Sofia has no clue about Cedric's evil schemes and deems him a good friend, borrowing a spell from him to make her an adequate dancer after messing up in dance class, thanks to Amber's naughty prank. The truth is that the "dancing spell" is actually one enforced to make everyone in the ballroom fall asleep, and that is when Cedric will trade the remedy for the amulet with Sofia. Before the ball, Amber accidentally rips her dress and stays in her room due to her humiliation and her brother James reprimanding her for the tricks she did to Sofia. During the ball, all the guests at the ball and the royal family current (excluding Sofia and Amber) fall asleep, including Cedric. The Amulet of Avalor summons Cinderella to give Sofia the courage to step forward and resolve matters with Amber. The two girls infiltrate Cedric's tower and find the counter-spell. After that, Sofia sews up Amber's dress for her and Amber repays the favor by teaching her how to dance. Waking up everyone, Sofia dances proudly at her ball, as her new father anoints her the title of Princess Sofia the First. Songs: "I'm Not Ready to be a Princess", "Royal Prep", "A Little Bit of Food", "True Sisters", and "Rise and Shine (end titles)" Disney Princess guest: Cinderella from Walt Disney's animated film Cinderella (1950) Guest star: Jennifer Hale as Cinderella

=== Season 1 (2013–14) ===
No. overall	No. in season	Title	Written by	Original release date	U.S. viewers (millions)
1	1	"Just One of the Princes"	Craig Gerber	January 11, 2013	2.73
Sofia's introduction to royal life involves flying horses with wings. After watching a flying derby race, she joins the Royal Prep flying derby team, determined to be the first princess on it. With the support of her friends and a small horse named Minimus, she trains hard and eventually wins, proving that anything can be a 'princess thing'. Songs: "Princess Things" and "Anything" Guest star: Eric Stonestreet as Minimus Absent: Jess Harnell as Cedric
2	2	"The Big Sleepover"	Erica Rothschild	January 18, 2013	2.14
Sofia is excited to host her first royal slumber party at the castle. She invites her best friends, Ruby and Jade, from the village, while her stepsister Amber invites Princess Hildegard and Princess Cleo from Royal Prep. However, Amber and her friends are unimpressed by Ruby and Jade’s energetic and carefree behavior, so Sofia tries to help her friends fit in by encouraging them to act more like princesses. Unfortunately, this only makes Ruby and Jade feel hurt and believe that Sofia doesn’t accept them for who they are. Upset, they leave the party. Although Amber and her friends are pleased, Sofia feels terrible and chases after Ruby and Jade. With encouragement from Miranda, Sofia learns the importance of appreciating people for who they are. She apologizes to her friends, and they reconcile at the castle gates. The three girls return to the castle and decide to have their own sleepover in Sofia’s room. Meanwhile, Amber and the other princesses realize their party isn’t any fun without Sofia and her friends. They apologize as well, and all the girls become friends and enjoy a wonderful sleepover together. Song: "Perfect Slumber Party" Absent: Wayne Brady as Clover
3	3	"Let the Good Times Troll"	Doug Cooney	January 25, 2013	2.17
While playing with James and Amber, Sofia accidentally drops her kite near an ominous cave that is rumored to be home to green trolls. James tells the story of King Gideon, who believed the trolls were attacking the kingdom after seeing them banging their clubs outside the castle. He ordered his guards to drive them back into their cave and made a rule that they were never allowed to leave again. Sofia befriends a troll named Gnarly and a toddler troll named Teeny. She soon discovers that the trolls only want to come to the surface to look at the stars and that the banging of their clubs is actually their way of making music when they’re happy, not to attack. Hoping to prove the trolls are friendly, Sofia secretly brings them into the castle to perform for her family. However, she gets into trouble for breaking the king’s rule, and the trolls are chased back to their cave. Sofia apologizes to them, and after learning the truth, King Roland realizes the trolls were misunderstood. He lifts the old rule and allows the trolls to come to the surface whenever they wish to admire the stars. Song: "Make Some Noise!" Absent: Jess Harnell as Cedric
4	4	"Cedric's Apprentice"	Craig Gerber	February 1, 2013	2.20
Sofia wants to practice sorcery for her test, so she volunteers to be Cedric's trainee. Cedic schemes to steal her amulet but faces conflicting guidance from his parents. When his invisibility potion fails, he teaches Sofia instead. Cedric admits his fear of King Roland, and Sofia helps him impress King Magnus with a magic show. She passes her test and gives Cedric the gold star certificate she received, leading him to change his schemes and use his invisibility potion on her rabbit friend Clover instead of himself. Song: "Cedric the Great"
5	5	"A Royal Mess"	Laurie Israel & Rachel Ruderman	February 8, 2013	2.49
James breaks a stained glass window characterizing their family while practicing juggling inside the castle which was against the rules. Sofia lies and takes the responsibility to make the commitment to let her siblings attend the Golden Wing Circus. James yet confesses that he broke the window, and the family learns the significance of telling the truth. The circus comes to the castle to make amends, delighting the children. Song: "At the Golden Wing Circus" Absent: Wayne Brady as Clover
6	6	"The Shy Princess"	Erica Rothschild	February 22, 2013	2.62
Sofia partners with shy Princess Vivian for a class art project. They visit Vivian's castle where Sofia's bunny friend Clover, befriends Vivian's dragon, Crackle. Sofia notices Vivian's shyness disappears when she plays the mandolin and sings. To help Vivian overcome her shyness, they decide to present together through music at show-and-tell. Vivian's newfound cheerfulness and lovely voice attract others, leading to new friendships. Grateful for her first friend, Vivian joins the school band. Absent: Travis Willingham as King Roland II, Jess Harnell as Cedric, Tim Gunn as Baileywick Song: "All You Need" Guest stars: Ellie Kemper as Crackle; Karan Brar as Zandar; Eric Stonestreet as Minimus
7	7	"Blue Ribbon Bunny"	Craig Gerber	March 15, 2013	2.01
Sofia, Amber, and James enter their pets in the Dunwiddie Village Pet Fair's pet contest for a chance to win a blue ribbon. Amber convinces Sofia to swap Clover for a talented rabbit named Ginger, hurting Clover's feelings. However, Sofia realizes the importance of friendship and brings Clover back to the contest. Clover impresses with his dancing and they win the contest, riding together in the village parade. Absent: Sara Ramirez as Queen Miranda, Travis Willingham as King Roland II, Jess Harnell as Cedric, Tim Gunn as Baileywick Song: "(I'm a) Blue Ribbon Bunny" Guest star: Ellie Kemper as Crackle
8	8	"The Princess Test"	Laurie Israel & Rachel Ruderman	April 12, 2013	2.83
Flora, Fauna, and Merryweather announce a princess test for Sofia. She studies with her friends in the library, where they emphasize the importance of a princess's attire and etiquette. On the way to the test, Sofia helps a librarian, Mrs. Higgins, with her book when her wheelbarrow breaks. They encounter obstacles, and Sofia's dress gets dirty, and her fan is lost. Sofia eventually reaches Mrs. Higgins' cottage, but it's revealed that "Mrs. Higgins" was Fauna in disguise. Sofia earns full marks for her test because she helped others, a vital aspect of being a princess. Song: "I Belong"
9	9	"Baileywick's Day Off"	Doug Cooney	April 26, 2013	1.55
King Roland grants Baileywick a day off for his birthday to spend time with his brother, Nigel. Sofia, Amber, and James plan a playdate for their friends, each enjoying activities tailored to their interests. While playing, their games cause minor issues, prompting Baileywick to assist. He spends his day off working, missing the planned activities with Nigel. After their friends leave, the children, including Nigel, recreate the day's activities for Baileywick. Song: "Count on Baileywick" Guest star: Jeffrey Tambor as Nigel
10	10	"Tri-Kingdom Picnic"	Laurie Israel & Rachel Ruderman	May 17, 2013	1.69
At the annual Tri-Kingdom picnic, the children and their parents compete for the Golden Chalice Trophy. James partners with Sofia while Amber drops out to paint parasols with Princess Lina of Khaldon. James's bad sportsmanship leads to everyone quitting the games. Amber suggests showing him how to play by watching the parents, which helps. James apologises, and they resume the games. Khaldon wins the Golden Chalice, and James vows to win next year. Song: "The Picnic of the Year"
11	11	"The Little Witch"	Erica Rothschild	May 31, 2013	1.73
Sofia returns to the Dunwiddie Village for Jade's birthday party and meets a young witch named Lucinda, who has been hexing children out of loneliness. Sofia teaches Lucinda how to make friends. Lucinda undoes her spells on the village kids, including Jade's garden. Jade builds a trap that backfires, ruining the party and blaming Lucinda. After reflecting, Jade realises her mistake and invites Lucinda to the party again. Lucinda uses magic to fix everything, and they celebrate Jade's birthday together. Song: "Good Little Witch"
12	12	"Two to Tangu"	Erica Rothschild	June 14, 2013	2.62
Sofia, Amber, James, Hildegard, Vivian, Clio, Jun, and two of James' prince friends visit the kingdom of Tangu for a surprise party. They ride flying carpets, but Sofia and Amber crash into a marketplace. A fortune teller guides them to Tangu Park, but their carpet traps them in the Hanging Gardens. They seek help from Jasmine to help, who encourages Amber to try new things, and helps them deal with the crazy carpet. Meanwhile Zandar impresses Hildegard with elephant shows and Tangu's culture. Sofia and Amber finally reach Tangu Peak. They all return to their kingdom with lasting memories. Song: "The Ride of Your Lives" Disney Princess guest: Jasmine from Disney's animated film Aladdin (1992) Guest stars: Linda Larkin and Lea Salonga (singing) as Jasmine, Karan Brar as Zandar
13	13	"Finding Clover"	Craig Gerber & Doug Cooney	June 28, 2013	2.66
Clover feels neglected and joins a travelling magic act to be in the spotlight. Sofia misses him, learns about it from her bird friends, and decides to bring him back. She seeks help from a fortune teller, Madam Ubetcha, and locates the circus in Somerset Village. They reunite, but the magician captures Clover. Sofia and Clover hatch a plan to rescue him using a vanishing box trick. They escape with the help of their animal friends, and back at the castle, they promise to spend more time together. Song: "Bring My Best Friend Back" Guest stars: Ellie Kemper as Crackle; Eric Stonestreet as Minimus
14	14	"The Amulet of Avalor"	Laurie Israel & Rachel Ruderman	July 12, 2013	2.68
King Roland surprises Amber and Sofia with new jewels from the Royal treasury, which has now enhanced security with griffins as guards. Sofia briefly removes her amulet to try on a necklace, but it is stolen. Cedric, seeking Sofia's amulet, causes more thefts. Clover, Mia, and Robin attempt to catch the thief but fail to do so. Sofia's amulet was a gift from King Roland and he shares its significance. Cedric's flying machine crashes during a chase. The thief is revealed to be a baby griffin, and Sofia is reunited with her amulet and regains her ability to communicate with animals. Song: "I'll Get My/That Amulet"
15	15	"The Buttercups"	Doug Cooney	August 2, 2013	2.95
Sofia goes on an outing with her Buttercup Scout friends, including Baileywick. He brings unnecessary princess supplies which hinder her activities. When Baileywick tries to help, he touches a poisonous plant and gets rashes. The troop builds a makeshift sled to get everyone down a steep trail, earning Sofia her last badge. Baileywick returns to the castle, informing Roland that Sofia is independent. The Buttercup Scouts make him an honorary troop leader with his own vest and a 'Being Prepared' badge. Song: "We're Buttercups!" Guest star: Viola Davis as Helen Hanshaw
16	16	"Make Way for Miss Nettle"	Erica Rothschild	August 23, 2013	2.10
Sofia, James, and Prince Desmond attend an enchanted horticulture curse taught by Miss Nettle, a former apprentice of Flora, Fauna, and Merryweather. They discover her evil plan to steal the headmistress's spell book. They seek help from their dance teacher, Mr. Pop-off, but Miss Nettle traps him. The kids decide to find the spell book by themselves, discovering it's in the clocktower. They outsmart Miss Nettle, make her laugh with enchanted Laughing Lillies, and retrieve the spell book. With Desmond's courage, they disarm Miss Nettle, freeing the fairies and banishing Miss Nettle for good. Song: "Make Way for Miss Nettle!" Guest star: Megan Mullally as Miss Nettle
17	17	"The Amulet and the Anthem"	Matt Boren	September 13, 2013	2.16
Sofia brags about singing the Enchancian Anthem at the Harvest Festival, upsetting Ruby and Jade. Her amulet curses her to croak like a frog when she sings or speaks. She seeks help from Cedric, but to no avail. Belle arrives to help and encourages Sofia to make amends. Cedric tries to take Sofia's amulet, but Sofia fixes it by apologising to her friends. The curse lifts, and she joins her friends on stage to sing. Songs: "Enchancia Anthem" and "Make it Right" Disney Princess guest: Belle from Disney's animated film Beauty and the Beast (1991) Guest star: Julie Nathanson as Belle
18	18	"Tea for Too Many"	Doug Cooney	September 27, 2013	1.51
Sofia is chosen to host the next Royal Prep tea party. Amber tries to make it extravagant, but everything goes wrong. Sofia decides to keep it simple in a secret garden, where everyone decorates their own teacups. While not as big as Amber had hoped, it's charming and reflects Sofia's style. Everyone agrees that its the most charming party they have ever been to. Song: "Bigger is Better"
19	19	"Princess Butterfly"	Erica Rothschild	October 11, 2013	1.78
At Royal Prep's All Hallows Eve costume Ball, Amber usually wins the costume contest. But this year, everyone has to create their own costumes, and Amber is concerned. She borrows a spell from Cedric to develop a butterfly costume. It becomes real, and she is unable to remove it. Cedric wants Sofia's amulet in trade for the remedy. Amber tries to take the amulet but confides in Sofia instead. She denies the amulet and wants to confess, but Wormwood, Cedric's raven, steals it. A chase ensues, and Amber gets back the amulet, confesses to the fairies that she cheated, and they lift the spell. She vows to return the trophy to the school. Song: "Who's That?"
20	20	"Great Aunt-Venture"	Carter Crocker	October 25, 2013	1.73
Sofia, Amber, and James plan to go to the carnival, but their aunt, Tilly, visits. The twins go to the carnival, leaving Sofia with Tilly. They venture out into the mysterious Arabella orchard to gather special apples for Tilly's pie. They get lost but eventually find their way back with some help. In the orchard, a wombeast named Wilbur takes their apples. Sofia learns he's hungry and lonely. She invites him to dinner and they promise to serve him the apples. When the twins return from the carnival, they share their adventures, including Sofia's memorable orchard journey with Tilly. Song: "A Recipe for Adventure" Guest star: Bonnie Hunt as Aunt Tilly
21	21	"The Baker King"	Laurie Israel & Rachel Ruderman	November 8, 2013	1.81
King Roland finds an enchanted mirror in the attic, wishes for a simple life as a village baker and his wish comes true. He and the royal family become bakers but quickly realize it's not that easy. Sofia teaches him that being a villager has its own challenges. They have to attend a grand ball in order to return to their royal duties, so Roland bakes a cake as an excuse. They eat the cake at the ball, only for it to be extremely unsatisfying. Song: "The Simple Life"
22	22	"The Floating Palace"	Craig Gerber	November 24, 2013	4.72
23	23	"The Floating Palace"	Craig Gerber	November 24, 2013	4.72
Sofia's family vacations at Merroway Cove, which is rumored to house mermaids. Cedric plots to steal the powerful mermaid comb. Sofia transforms into a mermaid, be with a mermaid named Oona and learns of the mermaid Queen Emmaline's plan to sink the royal ship. She promises to move the ship but faces disbelief from her parents. Oona gets captured by Cedric. Sofia with the help of her new friend Ariel, Cora and animal friends, saves Oona, mends the relationship between mermaids and humans, and foils Cedric's plan. Songs: "Merroway Cove" and "The Love We Share" Disney Princess guest: Ariel from Disney's animated film The Little Mermaid (1989) Guest star: Jodi Benson as Ariel and Queen Emmaline
24	24	"Holiday in Enchancia"	Craig Gerber	December 1, 2013	1.19
A blizzard traps King Roland in a forest cabin while he shops for last-minute presents. Worried, Sofia, Amber, James and Queen Miranda set out to find him but get stuck in the blizzard. Aurora advises Sofia to rely on her animal friends. Mia and Robin locate King Roland and bring everyone together. They share Wassalia with a village family and give them their presents. They light the Wassalia candle and feast together. Songs: "Wassalia" and "Peace and Joy" Disney Princess guest: Aurora from Walt Disney's animated film Sleeping Beauty (1959) Guest stars: Kate Higgins as Aurora, Eric Stonestreet as Minimus
25	25	"Four's a Crowd"	Elizabeth Keyishian	February 14, 2014	2.43
Sofia invites Ruby and Jade to the Flylight Pageant. Amber becomes close to them, leaving Sofia feeling left out. She tries to have breakfast with Ruby and Jade without Amber, but to no avail. Sofia spills gooseberry pie on the coach, upsetting Amber. Sofia admits her feelings, and they reconcile, redecorating the coach together. Ruby, Jade, and Amber give Sofia a tiara, and they all ride together in the Flylight Pageant. Song: "Royal Fun"

=== Season 2 (2014–15) ===
All episodes in this season are directed by Jamie Mitchell.

No. overall	No. in season	Title	Written by	Original release date	Prod. code	US viewers (millions)
26	1	"Two Princesses and a Baby"	Laurie Israel & Rachel Ruderman	March 7, 2014	202	1.91
Amber dislikes sharing her birthday with James and wants separate celebrations. She asks Cedric for a spell, but it turns James into a baby. Amber changes the celebration to suit herself while Sofia looks after baby James. Amber finds a touching gift from James and sings their twin song to bring him back. Cedric fixes the spell, and their parents return without knowing what happened. Amber mends James's kazoo, and they celebrate their birthday together, learning the significance of their bond. Songs: "Sisters and Brothers" and "Two by Two"
27	2	"The Enchanted Feast"	Craig Gerber & Michael G. Stern	April 4, 2014	201	1.49
Cedric is preparing to show off his exceptionally strong magical abilities at the Enchanted Feast, which is a grand dinner for all of the kings and queens in the Tri-Kingdom area. But the evil fairy, Miss Nettle, disguises herself as a sorceress and takes over the feast to steal Sofia's amulet. At the feast, Sofia realizes there is something familiar about "Sasha" and has a bad feeling. Snow White appears and tells Sofia that people aren't always as they seem and she needs to trust her feelings. Sofia and Clover form an unlikely alliance with Cedric and Wormwood to protect her mystical amulet and save her family. Song: "All You Desire" Disney Princess guest: Snow White from Walt Disney's animated film Snow White and the Seven Dwarfs (1937) Guest stars: Katie Von Till as Snow White, Megan Mullally as Miss Nettle and Pamela Adlon as Rosey
28	3	"The Flying Crown"	Erica Rothschild	April 11, 2014	203	1.55
Sofia and James prepare for the Flying Derby Championship, but James injures his wrist. Their old rival, Prince Hugo, is reluctant to join. Sofia learns that Hugo's attitude is due to pressure from his family. She talks to him, and he agrees to team up. However, during practice, Hugo still wants to win alone. Sofia, with the help from James and the crowd, shows Hugo the importance of teamwork. They race together and win the Flying Crown. Hugo realizes the value of teamwork and changes for the better, becoming friends with Sofia. Song: "Huzzah! Huzzah!" Guest star: Eric Stonestreet as Minimus
29	4	"Mom's the Word"	Michael G. Stern	April 25, 2014	204	1.92
It's Mother's Day, and Sofia is excited to spend the day with her mother until she learns that Amber and James are joining the fun. Sofia asks Lucinda, whether she can cast a spell so that she and her mother can be alone, but it ends in disaster when Lucinda's mother starts hexing them. Song: "Me and My Mom"
30	5	"The Silent Knight"	Laurie Israel & Rachel Ruderman	May 9, 2014	205	1.62
It is time to present the shield of valor to someone for a brave act, so all the knights in the kingdom come together. Sofia meets her favorite knight, Sir Bartleby, otherwise known as the silent knight as no one has heard him speak. The recipient of the shield is revealed to be Aunt Tilly, and Bartleby starts to fancy her. Song: "Tilly, Oh Tilly!" Guest star: Bonnie Hunt as Aunt Tilly
31	6	"Enchanted Science Fair"	Carter Crocker & Erica Rothschild	May 30, 2014	206	2.28
It's almost time for the Enchanted Science Fair, and Sofia and her classmates must pair up to work on their projects. When they discover that they need to find a magical ingredient at the top of a mountain, they compete to see who can reach the summit first- at the risk of their science projects and their friendships. Song: "Friendship is the Formula"
32	7	"King for a Day"	Dani Michaeli	June 27, 2014	208	2.32
King Roland leaves Prince James in charge of the kingdom for one day while he and Queen Miranda are out. James, with the help of Sofia, learns what a fair and good leader should be. Song: "Be Your Own King"
33	8	"When You Wish Upon a Well"	Michael G. Stern	July 11, 2014	207	2.62
Amber becomes jealous of Sofia when she gets all of Roland's attention. When Amber finds an old wishing well, she wishes for Roland to be allergic to Sofia, only for Sofia to turn into a cat. Song: "Make Your Wishes Well"
34	9	"Gizmo Gwen"	Michael G. Stern	July 25, 2014	209	N/A
Amber is holding a banquet, but it all goes horribly wrong when her massive strawberry decoration crashes down and ruins her entire party. Sofia meets a kitchen maid called Gwen, who makes gizmos in her spare time. With the help of some of Gwen's inventions, Amber's banquet is fixed. Song: "Believe in Your Dream" Guest star: Ginnifer Goodwin as Gwen
35	10	"Sofia the Second"	Erica Rothschild	August 1, 2014	210	2.49
The Highland Hootenanny is in town, but Sofia's plans change when Roland tells her that Lord Gilbert is coming and bringing his daughter Lady Joy a day early. After seeing Cedric use a copying spell, Sofia clones herself with it so she can go to the hootenanny and the clone can play with Joy. But Sofia messes up the spell and the clone turns out to be a rotten troublemaker. Song: "Keeping Promises No Matter What" Guest star: G Hannelius as Lady Joy
36	11	"Mystic Meadows"	Michael G. Stern	August 8, 2014	213	2.08
Out on a field trip with the Buttercup Scouts, Sofia and her friends visit a retirement village for elder sorcerers and wizards. Coincidentally, Cedric's parents reside there. Cedric accompanies the Buttercups on their field trip, and Sofia offers to help him earn his father's respect and the family wand. Song: "Mystic Meadows"
37	12	"Princesses to the Rescue!"	Laurie Israel & Rachel Ruderman	August 15, 2014	212	2.48
While visiting the Kingdom of Wei-Ling, James and Prince Jin set off to search for the legendary treasure of the Jade Jaguar but soon find themselves and their fathers trapped in the jaguar's den. It's up to Sofia, Amber, Jun, and Mulan to rescue their loving families. Song: "Stronger Than You Know" Disney Princess guest: Mulan from Disney's animated film Mulan (1998) Guest stars: Ming-Na Wen and Lea Salonga (singing) as Mulan
38	13	"Ghostly Gala"	Laurie Israel & Rachel Ruderman	October 3, 2014	211	1.49
While Sofia and James help decorate the castle for a Halloween party, a ghost by the name of Sir Dax wants to throw a party in the castle himself for his ghostly friends and family. This proves conflicting for Sofia as Sir Dax wants to scare all the people out and keep all the ghosts in. Song: "The Ghostly Gala"
39	14	"The Emerald Key"	Laurie Israel & Rachel Ruderman	October 11, 2014	215	2.38
Princess Lani of Hakalo is washed ashore onto Enchancia during a violent storm separating her from her parents. In her possession is her family's Emerald Key, which allows them to return home to Hakalo. Sofia and her family offer to take her in until her parents return safely, but an evil witch plots to use this to her advantage by magically posing as Lani to steal the Emerald Key for herself. Unable to tell both apart, King Roland holds a competition to prove which one is the real Lani. Song: "A Princess True"
40	15	"Scrambled Pets"	Erica Rothschild	October 17, 2014	214	1.44
Sofia reluctantly accepts Amber's suggestion to secretly bring their pets to school without permission, but a magical mishap causes their respective pets to be scrambled. It's up to Sofia, Amber, James, and Vivian to fix the problem before more problems ensue. Song: "In Your Paws" Guest star: Fiona Bishop as Princess Zooey
41	16	"The Princess Stays in the Picture"	Krista Tucker	October 24, 2014	216	1.44
Sofia is paired with Princess Hildegard to work on an enchanted painting for art class. Thanks to Hildegard's lack of listening skills, the princesses end up in the paintings in the school hallway. As they try to escape, Hildegard keeps insisting she knows everything much to Sofia's annoyance. Song: "Know It All"
42	17	"Baileywhoops"	Michael G. Stern	November 7, 2014	219	1.72
When the Kingdom of Enchancia is having a Jubilee, a new steward who wanted Baileywick's job gives him a cursed pin that causes him to be very clumsy, leading Sofia to help Baileywick by becoming his junior steward assistant. Meanwhile, Cedric competes with King Magnus's Sorcerer to entertain the other children. He turns the merry-go-round James and Amber are on into winged unicorns. Song: "Helping Hand"
43	18	"The Curse of Princess Ivy"	Craig Gerber & Erica Rothschild	November 23, 2014	217	3.56
44	19	"The Curse of Princess Ivy"	Craig Gerber & Erica Rothschild	November 23, 2014	218	3.56
Sofia makes the mistake of revealing the secret of her magical amulet to her stepsister, Amber. Jealous of the amulet’s powers, Amber steals it and tries to use it to summon a princess. However, these acts of selfishness causes the amulet to place a curse on Amber. It summons the wicked Princess Ivy, a banished princess who plans to seize the throne and transform the colorful kingdom into a black and white monochrome. To save everyone, Sofia and Amber set aside their differences, work together, defeat Ivy, and break the curse by learning the importance of trust, honesty, and forgiveness. Songs: "A Kingdom of My Own", "Smoke, Wings, and Fire", and "Dare to Risk it All" Disney Princess guest: Rapunzel from Disney's animated film Tangled (2010) Guest stars: Mandy Moore as Rapunzel, Anna Camp as Princess Ivy, John Michael Higgins as Flambeau, Oliver Platt as Everburn
45	20	"Winter's Gift"	Michael G. Stern	December 12, 2014	222	1.66
Sofia meets Winter, a girl faun who freezes everything she touches, and helps her to find the perfect gift for the mountain ice witch who can undo the snowy spell done upon her. She was influenced by a princess who can freeze anything to the touch in another kingdom and decided she could do the same with this gift. Song: "From the Heart" Disney Princess guest: Tiana from Disney's animated film The Princess and the Frog (2009) Guest stars: Anika Noni Rose as Tiana, Alyson Hannigan as Winter, Phylicia Rashad as Glacia the Ice Witch, Nick Offerman as Whiskers
46	21	"The Leafsong Festival"	Laurie Israel & Rachel Ruderman	January 16, 2015	220	1.41
Crackle wants to sing in the Leafsong Festival, but she can only get in by giving up her ability to breathe fire. When Cedric tries to take advantage, Sofia helps Crackle to reclaim her ability and save the kingdom. Song: "I Feel So Free"
47	22	"Substitute Cedric"	Krista Tucker	February 20, 2015	221	1.94
The Fairies are going away to a meeting, but Fauna has forgotten to get a substitute for sorcery class. Sofia volunteers Cedric to substitute the class. A group of pranksters from Hexly Hall play a prank as part of a tradition. Sofia, Cedric, and the gang need to stop them before they destroy the school. Song: "Never Forget the Sorcerer's Secret"
48	23	"Clover Time"	Laurie Israel & Rachel Ruderman	March 27, 2015	224	1.60
Clover's rabbit hole is flooded with rain, so Clover moves in with Sofia. However, Clover proves to be a sloppy roommate, and with a famous artist coming to the castle to paint the children's bedrooms, Sofia must keep Clover from messing things up. Meanwhile, Amber is excited when she finds a star in the sky that no one else has discovered and she might get to name the star. Song: "Hoppin' Out With You" sung by Clover and Sofia
49	24	"In a Tizzy"	Erica Rothschild	March 27, 2015	227	1.67
Sofia's village friend Ruby enlists the help of a fairy godmother named Tizzy to help her win a Dunwiddie Go-Carriage race. Song: "Making Dreams Come True" Guest star: Melissa Rauch as Tizzy
50	25	"A Tale of Two Teams"	Michael G. Stern	March 27, 2015	225	1.48
Ruby and Jade are taking part in an annual sporting event and they insist Sofia join their team. However, when her older brother and sister reveal they themselves are competing against them and invite her to be part of their team, Sofia must choose which side to be with. Song: "Play With Us!"
51	26	"The Littlest Princess"	Laurie Israel & Rachel Ruderman	July 1, 2015	226	2.00
Sofia's amulet gives her a new power that allows her to shrink in size, which she uses to befriend a group of mischievous sprites who want to do nothing but have fun. But when she disobeys her mother, her amulet curses her, preventing her from growing big again. Song: "Small New World"
52	27	"Buttercup Amber"	Michael G. Stern	July 8, 2015	228	1.92
Amber is appointed a Buttercup Scout. However, she learns that all the rigorous work the scouts do proves difficult for her to keep up. Song: "Improvise"
53	28	"Carol of the Arrow"	Krista Tucker	July 15, 2015	229	1.77
Sofia overhears her idol, Carol of the Arrow, saying that the Royal Family doesn't do anything to help the villagers who are in need. So, she joins her merry band of do-gooders while pretending to be a normal village girl to prove Carol wrong. But the second-in-command, Jane, becomes jealous of Sofia when she steals a lot of Carol's attention. She fears Sofia could replace her in the band, so she sabotages Sofia's good deeds. Song: "Any Deed for Those in Need" Guest star: Vivica A. Fox as Carol
54	29	"Sidekick Clio"	Erica Rothschild	July 22, 2015	230	1.73
While Hildegard has gone away for a vacation, Clio helps Sofia practice for the upcoming school musical auditions. During practice, Sofia learns Clio is a natural at singing that she suggests Clio try out for auditions herself. But when Hildegard comes back early, Clio tries to keep the play a secret from her. Songs: "My First Flight" and "Wings of a Dream"
55	30	"Minimus is Missing" (Note: There is a discrepancy across various unofficial online episode guides about whether "Minimus is Missing" is a second season episode or a third season episode. It is being classified as a season two episode here based on its placement in Disney's online episode listing under Season 2. See talk page for more information.)	Erica Rothschild	August 12, 2015	223	1.64
Minimus and other flying horses in the entire kingdom are swept away by a mischievous young wizard named Wendell, who plays hypnotic music with his magical lute. Sofia and her siblings band together to rescue them. Song: "Wendell's Way"

=== DJ Melodies (2015) ===
1. "Brave Adventure" – April 4, 2015
2. "The More the Merrier" – April 9, 2015

=== Season 3 (2015–17) ===
No. overall	No. in season	Title	Directed by	Written by	Original release date	Prod. code	US viewers (millions)
56	1	"Cool Hand Fluke"	Jamie Mitchell	Michael G. Stern	August 5, 2015	302	1.55
The Royal Family is having a picnic in Merroway Cove, and Sofia gets the idea to throw a party for the merpeople. A merboy named Fluke becomes jealous of Sofia for receiving so much attention because of her heroics during her last visit. Song: "Moment to Shine"
57	2	"Cedric Be Good"	Jamie Mitchell & Mircea Kyle Mantta	Laurie Israel & Rachel Ruderman	September 18, 2015	307	1.10
Cedric succeeds at last in stealing Sofia's amulet, by switching it with a fake. But whenever Cedric tries to use its power to take over the kingdom, it curses him in a variety of ways. He seeks Sofia's help in becoming a good person when he learns the curses can only be broken by doing good deeds. Song: "A Better Me"
58	3	"Princess Adventure Club"	Jamie Mitchell	Erica Rothschild	September 25, 2015	308	1.33
Princess Zooey is having a hard time making friends when she comes to Royal Prep. She decides to start a Princess Adventure Club and invites all the princesses to join except Amber, who was rude to her on her first day. Song: "When it Comes To Making Friends"
59	4	"Minding the Manor"	Jamie Mitchell	Krista Tucker	October 2, 2015	305	1.49
Sofia visits her Aunt Tilly's manor house to help her set up for her garden party. While Aunt Tilly is out getting food for the party, Sofia is left to watch over the house and prepare it for the garden party. However, it proves tricky to maintain when three troublesome gargoyles run amok. Song: "It's Up to You" Guest star: Bonnie Hunt as Aunt Tilly
60	5	"The Secret Library"	Jamie Mitchell	Craig Gerber	October 12, 2015	310	2.03
When Sofia's Aunt Tilly visits Enchancia, she gives Sofia a special book that guides her to a secret library hidden in the castle. The library is filled with hundreds of unfinished books, and Sofia is the only one who can give each story a happy ending. Sofia selects the story of Minimus's brother, Mazzimo, who has been captured by the arrogant and greedy Prince Roderick of Borrea. It's up to Sofia and Minimus to rescue Mazzimo and grant him his one wish: to be free. Song: "Save the Day" Disney Princess guest: Merida from Disney/Pixar's film Brave (2012) Guest stars: Ruth Connell as Merida, Bonnie Hunt as Aunt Tilly
61	6	"New Genie on the Block"	Jamie Mitchell	Krista Tucker	October 16, 2015	301	1.52
On her way to Tangu to meet Prince Zandar, Sofia accidentally summons a kid genie named Kazeem, who runs loose by granting wishes for many people he runs into in the kingdom. With the help of Genie Patrol Fizz, Zandar and Sofia are hot on Kazeem's trail. Song: "Genie Rules"
62	7	"The Fliegel Has Landed"	Jamie Mitchell	Michael G. Stern	October 23, 2015	306	1.26
When a fliegel named Grotta starts picking on Sofia's troll friend Gnarly, she tries to teach him to stand up for himself. Guest Star: Jessica DiCicco as Grotta the Fliegel Song: "This Fliegel Has Landed"
63	8	"The Princess Ballet"	Jamie Mitchell & Mircea Kyle Mantta	Laurie Israel & Rachel Ruderman	November 1, 2015	311	2.40
Princess Kari is revealed to be the most accomplished Princess at Royal Prep. She, Amber, and Sofia volunteer for the ballet part of the school's Arts Night. Determined to be perfect like her mother, who was a prima ballerina when she was a student at Royal Prep, Kari strives for perfection in dancing. Song: "Gotta Reach a Higher Height" Guest star: Kiara Muhammad as Princess Kari
64	9	"All the Sprite Moves"	Jamie Mitchell & Larry Leichliter	Erica Rothschild	November 6, 2015	303	1.45
Not wanting to move from her old castle, Vivian tricks her parents into thinking their new castle is haunted with a little help from Sofia's wee sprite friends. Meanwhile, Clover eats an enchanted Liking Berry in the new castle's enchanted garden and falls head over heels for Crackle, which starts to creep her out. Song: "I Like You So Much"
65	10	"Sofia in Elvenmoor"	Jamie Mitchell & Larry Leichliter	Krista Tucker	November 13, 2015	309	1.06
While her father is busy with the royal road crew in the Whispering Woods, Sofia and Clover discover a Silver Tree that leads them to a secret land inhabited by elves. But the royal road crew wants to clear the path by cutting down the Silver Tree. If this happens, the door to Elvenmoor will be closed forever. Song: "Elvenmoor"
66	11	"Stormy Lani"	Jamie Mitchell & Larry Leichliter	Allen J. Zipper	November 20, 2015	313	1.07
Princess Lani controls her kingdom's weather with her moods, but when she loses her temper during a quest, she loses control of her powers. Sofia must teach her to control her temper in order to fulfill her family's legacy. Song: "Sunny Thoughts"
67	12	"Lord of the Rink"	Jamie Mitchell	Laurie Israel & Rachel Ruderman	December 4, 2015	231	1.23
Sofia, Amber, Maya, Cleo, and Lakshmi are learning ice dancing. Prince Hugo shows talent, but hides it because he thinks it's for girls. Sofia encourages him to do what he enjoys. Hugo pretends to be sick to attend ice dancing instead of hockey. Sofia and Hugo practice together, which draws the attention of King Garrick. He becomes the assistant hockey coach to spend more time with Hugo. Hugo tries to switch between classes, but the hockey team catches him. Garrick takes Hugo to hockey practice on the day of the ice dancing recital. Sofia convinces Hugo to tell his father the truth, and they perform it together. Garrick embraces his son's love for ice dancing and Hugo's friends want to learn it too. Song: "Take a Leap"
68	13	"The Secret Library: Olaf and the Tale of Miss Nettle"	Jamie Mitchell & Larry Leichliter	Rachel Ruderman & Craig Gerber	February 15, 2016	318	2.92
Sofia is summoned by the secret library and The Tale of Miss Nettle is selected, revealing that Sofia's old enemy is taking the prized snowdrops from Hildegard's kingdom of Freezenburg, which will ruin the Winter Flower Festival. While trying to stop Miss Nettle, Sofia is sprayed with the fairy's Crazy Crystals, which causes her amulet to malfunction: she can no longer understand animals by translation, and instead of a princess, Olaf the snowman is summoned to help her resolve things. Note: After the amulet goes awry, Anna and Elsa are mentioned. Song: "My Finest Flower" Guest star: Josh Gad as Olaf from Disney's Frozen
69	14	"Gone With the Wand"	Jamie Mitchell & Larry Leichliter	Michael G. Stern	March 4, 2016	314	1.30
After winning a contest, Sofia invites Cedric and his niece Calista to go visit his hero, Merlin the wizard. During the visit, Calista takes Merlin's dragon claw wand out of his tower, allowing Merlin's enemy Morgana the enchantress to take it. Merlin, Sofia, Calista, and Cedric must get the wand back before Morgana finds a way to unlock its power. Song: "Magic Like Merlin" Guest star: Jeff Bennett as Merlin from Disney's The Sword in the Stone
70	15	"Bad Little Dragon"	Jamie Mitchell & Mircea Kyle Mantta	Vivien Mejia	March 11, 2016	319	1.21
While visiting Zumaria, Sofia and Princess Vivian discover what appears to be a lost baby dragon and name him Crispy. As Vivian showers the dragon with attention, her dragon Crackle feels left out. However, Crackle soon uncovers the truth that Crispy is a small adult dragon pretending to be a baby so he can steal the jewels from Zumaria Castle. After no one believes her, Crackle teams up with Sofia to expose Crispy’s scheme, protect the treasure, and prove that her instincts were right all along. Song: "You're the Cutest Thing"
71	16	"Bunny Swap"	Jamie Mitchell	Erica Rothschild	March 25, 2016	312	1.91
Clover has a bad day and meets a wild rabbit named Barley, who looks just like him. Sofia accidentally brings Barley to the castle, leaving Clover in the village. Barley enjoys the castle life, while Clover struggles in the wild. Clover befriends Sassafras, who helps him find his way back home to the castle. Sofia suspects Barley isn't Clover due to voice difference and behavior. Barley confesses, and they journey back to the village in the midst of a storm. Clover and Sofia reconcile, and they return to the castle together. Song: "Living It Up"
72	17	"Her Royal Spyness"	Jamie Mitchell	Laurie Israel	April 8, 2016	321	1.27
When Amber spies on people with her telescope, she and Sofia believe that their mother has been kidnapped by a mystical creature. Song: "Be an Expert Expert"
73	18	"Best in Air Show"	Jamie Mitchell	Erica Rothschild	May 6, 2016	320	1.24
Grand Mum comes to visit Enchancia, and Sofia helps Minimus muster the confidence to perform a bold stunt routine in his parents' flying horse show. Song: "I'm a New Horse Now"
74	19	"Dads and Daughters Day"	Jamie Mitchell	Laurie Israel & Rachel Ruderman	June 17, 2016	304	N/A
The princesses at Royal Prep are looking forward to their upcoming Dads and Daughters field trip to the Enchanted Animal Park. But Princess Hildegard tells Sofia that she'll have a wonderful time even though King Roland isn't her real father, which hurts her feelings. During the trip, Sofia is still hurt by what Hildegard has said, and she doesn't feel any better as Amber and Roland have fun together and recall their past field trips. She thinks she doesn't belong since Roland is her stepfather, and she feels like she'll never be his real daughter. Song: "Dad's and Daughter's Song"
75	20	"The Secret Library: The Tale of the Noble Knight"	Jamie Mitchell	Laurie Israel & Rachel Ruderman	July 1, 2016	323	N/A
When Sofia visits the Secret Library, she learns The Tale of a Noble Knight seeking the Ice Fire Shield. But there are two knights looking for the shield, and Sofia doesn't know who the true Noble Knight is. Song: "A Knight Such as I (aka Greatness of Me)"
76	21	"The Bamboo Kite"	Jamie Mitchell	Craig Carlisle	July 8, 2016	325	0.72
Sofia visits the kingdom of Wei Ling to attend the Festival of Kites, where Jun has the honor of launching the first kite this year. Song: "This Panda Just Wants to Dance"
77	22	"Beauty is the Beast"	Jamie Mitchell	Erica Rothschild	August 12, 2016	322	0.76
Sofia's amulet summons her to help another princess, Princess Charlotte of Isleworth who has been cursed by an enchantress and turned into a beast. Song: "More to Adore" Guest star: Andrew Rannells as Morris
78	23	"Cauldronation Day"	Jamie Mitchell	Laurie Israel	October 7, 2016	324	1.26
Lucinda’s witch friends, Lily the Good Witch and Indigo the Bad Witch, are eager to become her Witch of Honor for her Cauldronation Day, so it's up to Sofia to keep them in line. Song: "The Broomstick Dance"
79	24	"Camp Wilderwood"	Jamie Mitchell & Larry Leichliter	Dana Starfield	October 28, 2016	327	0.99
King Roland and Queen Miranda send Sofia, James, and Amber to Camp Wilderwood, an enchanted campground with magical activities. They encounter the mischievous wizard Wendell Fidget, who's been sent there as a punishment. While Sofia enjoys her time, Amber struggles to make friends and James is unpopular due to an itching ivy incident. James and Wendell team up for an inter-camp competition, plotting to build a raft to escape. Sofia suggests pairing Amber with a new friend, Mandy, and joins them to build a boat when she can't find a partner for herself. Song: "Summer Camp Blues" sung by James
80	25	"Royal Vacation"	Jamie Mitchell	Laurie Israel	November 11, 2016	328	1.44
Roland, Amber, and James are so busy (Roland designing castles, Amber sorting clothes, James playing with soldier toys) that they don't make time for Miranda and Sofia. Miranda plans a family vacation that turns out to be a disaster. Their luggage falls out along the way to see flying elephants, and their guide Fabulous Freddy sends a note saying he's sick. Song: "What a Vacation"
81	26	"Hexley Hall"	Jamie Mitchell	Rachel Ruderman	January 6, 2017 (Note: This episode first aired on October 28, 2016 in Canada, but officially premiered on January 14, 2017.)	326	0.81
Sofia's amulet changes after releasing Elena. It now obeys her directly and turns from purple to pink. She becomes a rabbit like Clover and learns she must see an animal to transform into one. Cedric takes her to Hexley Hall to research. They meet Cedric's old teacher, Grimtrix the Good. They discover the amulets origins in Maru and learn about various magical objects. Cedric spills a potion on Wormwood, allowing him to understand him. Wormwood reunites with his old classmates. Song: "Our Wizards Are the Best!"
82	27	"The Princess Prodigy"	Jamie Mitchell	Rachel Ruderman	February 10, 2017	330	1.27
After a school music competition, prodigious music instructor Baron Von Rocha sees potential in Princess Vivian's skill in music. When she is offered apprenticeship to perfect her skills and lets Sofia and her friends join in, Vivian begins to show neglectfulness of her responsibilities, and her friends leave out of protest. More troubles occur when it's found out that Von Rocha seeks Vivian's talent by stealing it for himself with magic. Song: "The Magic in the Music"
83	28	"One for the Books"	Jamie Mitchell & Mircea Kyle Mantta	Erica Rothschild	March 31, 2017	329	1.13
A new school year begins for Sofia and her classmates, and when she realizes that her classmate Desmond has difficulties, she helps him to get along. Song: "Live it To Learn It"

=== Season 4 (2017–18) ===
All episodes in this season are directed by Jamie Mitchell and Mircea Kyle Mantta.

No. overall	No. in season	Title	Written by	Storyboard by	Original release date	Prod. code	US viewers (millions)
84	1	"Day of the Sorcerers"	Laurie Israel	Eugene Salandra, John Poremoy, Aldina Dias and Kurt Anderson	April 28, 2017	401	0.76
A secret meeting with his fellow sorcerers forces Cedric to choose between his long-held desire to seize the Enchancian throne and his friendship with Sofia. Song: "My Evil Dreams"
85	2	"The Secret Library: Tale of the Eternal Torch"	Don Gillies	Holly Forsyth, Lonnie Lloyd, and Viki Anderson	May 5, 2017	402	0.77
Sofia receives a summons from the Secret Library telling her about the tale of the Eternal Torch, an enchanted flame that is the center of a faraway land for dragons. However, sea creatures want the flame for themselves by turning it into that for water. James stows away in Sofia's coach, so he can join her on the mission and practice for his Junior Knight retest. But James keeps acting before he thinks and ends up making the mission tougher than it already is. Song: "This Island Belongs to Us"
86	3	"The Crown of Blossoms"	Craig Carlisle	Eugene Salandra, Aldina Dias, John Pomeroy, and Kurt Anderson	May 12, 2017	403	0.76
The Festival of Plenty is coming up, and Sofia not only plants a new garden for Clover but gets the honor of being this year's Princess of Plenty. Therefore, she gets to wear the Crown of Blossoms. However, when three magic seeds fall from the crown, Clover uses them to make his garden grow vegetables faster, and he refuses to share his veggies with his friends. To top it off, two gnomes come to retrieve the Crown of Blossoms. Song: "The Right Wrong Thing to Do"
87	4	"Pin the Blame on the Genie"	Matt Hoverman	Chris Otsuki, John Pomeroy, Francis Glebas, and Holly Forsyth	May 19, 2017	404	0.86
After Kazeem is accused of causing trouble in Tangu, Sofia goes to great lengths to clear his name. Song: "Give the Kid One More Chance"
88	5	"The Mystic Isles"	Laurie Israel & Rachel Ruderman	Aldina Dias, Hank Tucker, Chris Otsuki, John Pomeroy, Viki Anderson, Lonnie Lloyd, and Eugene Salandra	June 24, 2017	405	1.34
89	6	"The Mystic Isles"	Laurie Israel & Rachel Ruderman	Aldina Dias, Hank Tucker, Chris Otsuki, John Pomeroy, Viki Anderson, Lonnie Lloyd, and Eugene Salandra	June 24, 2017	406	1.34
90	7	"The Mystic Isles"	Laurie Israel & Rachel Ruderman	Aldina Dias, Hank Tucker, Chris Otsuki, John Pomeroy, Viki Anderson, Lonnie Lloyd, and Eugene Salandra	June 24, 2017	407	1.34
Amber finds another secret passageway to the Secret Library and finds out about Sofia's role as story keeper. Then Amber demands to go with Sofia to the Mystic Isles, where she has to stop an Evil Crystalmaster from covering the Isles in magic crystals. Sofia agrees to take Amber with her, and they meet an enthusiastic flying unicorn named Skye and Windwalkers who are Protectors of the Mystic Isles. But Amber's desire for a magic amulet of her own makes the mission no easier than it already is. Songs: "The Magic of the Mystic Isles", "Our Royal Plan", "My Power Will Be Crystal Clear", and "That's Not Who I Am"
91	8	"The Mystic Isles: The Princess and the Protector"	Craig Carlisle & Laurie Israel	Aldina Dias, Jill Colbert, Catherine Jones, and Holly Forsyth	June 30, 2017	409	1.16
Sofia meets her protector trainer, a feisty crystal fairy named Chrysta, and travels to the Isle of Forever Frost to begin her first assignment. Song: "Tough Enough"
92	9	"The Royal Dragon"	Rachel Ruderman	Kurt Anderson, Holly Forsyth, Francis Glebas, and Cathy Jones	July 21, 2017	410	1.13
The annual Roast-N-Toast has arrived, in which dragons from all the kingdoms gather in Brazendell. Crackle has no friend to go with, so Sofia uses her Amulet to transform into a dragon herself. They meet Crackle's boastful childhood rival Sizzle, and Crackle tries to outdo her to make friends. Meanwhile, Sir Oliver tries to ruin the event in revenge for his banishment. Song: "All Fired Up"
93	10	"The Mystic Isles: The Mare of the Mist"	Craig Carlisle	Aldina Dias, Holly Forsyth, Cathy Jones, and Eugene Salandra	August 4, 2017	412	0.98
Skye and Chrysta arrive to Enchancia to bring Sofia to the Mystic Isles to start the next step in being a protector: finding the Mare of the Mist, an enchanted horse whose mane can be used to create a bow for those deemed worthy. Minimus, however feels left out when Sofia decides to pick Skye over him, so he tags along and begins a rivalry with Skye. Song: "Pick Me"
94	11	"Through the Looking Back Glass"	Rachel Ruderman	Chris Otsuki and Hank Tucker	August 18, 2017	413	0.77
Cedric's sister, Cordelia, moves to the Enchancia Castle, which causes a rift between them. Sofia and Calista decide to use the Looking Back Glass to find out what really happened in the first place. Song: "Magic Touch" sung by Cedric and Cordelia
95	12	"Princess Jade"	Matt Hoverman	Jill Colbert, Lonnie Lloyd, and Eugene Salandra	September 1, 2017	414	0.63
It's School Swap Day for Royal Prep and Sofia's old school in Dunwiddie. Jade is visiting Royal Prep, and Amber is at the Dunwiddie School. While Sofia and Jade enjoy themselves, they find a picture of Frederika Assemblia, who looks exactly like Jade. They assume that Jade is a princess, which means she can go to Royal Prep full time. Jade is excited about this until she learns that it means leaving behind her other Dunwiddie friends, and she doesn't know how to tell Sofia that she no longer wants to go to Royal Prep. Meanwhile, when Amber realizes that the classes in Dunwiddie are different from the ones at Royal Prep, she tries to avoid trying them in order to avoid making a fool of herself. Songs: "Dunwiddie Ditty / Huzzah! Huzzah!" ("Huzzah! Huzzah" from "The Flying Crown")
96	13	"Ivy's True Colors"	Craig Carlisle	Holly Forsyth, Lonnie Lloyd, and Eugene Salandra	September 29, 2017	417	0.61
Sofia's amulet once again summons her to help a princess in need, but that princess turns out to be one of Sofia's old enemies: Princess Ivy. Princess Ivy's butterflies are missing and Sofia was sent to help her to find her butterflies. At last Princess Ivy had made friends with Ms. Nettle, and the animals had made a present for Princess Ivy. Song: "This Feeling I'm Feeling In Me" sung by Ivy and Sofia
97	14	"Too Cute to Spook"	Laurie Israel	Jill Colbert, Lonnie Lloyd, and Holly Forsyth	October 13, 2017	411	0.74
Sofia and Calista are going to spend some time with Sofia's witch friends on Holloween, but the witches think Calista will be a drag on them as she is too young. During trick or treat, Calista tries to not mess up the events and prove she can make sure everyone gets a treat in Lucinda's mom's maze. Song: "Super Spooky Night"
98	15	"Pirated Away"	Tom Rogers	Kurt Anderson, Eugene Salandra, Francis Glebas, and Hank Tucker	October 20, 2017	418	0.64
A band of bumbling pirates capture Miranda, Amber, and Sofia. Song: "Never Lost Again"
99	16	"The Mystic Isles: The Falcon's Eye"	Rachel Ruderman	Doug McCarthy, Francis Glebas, and Chris Otsuki	October 27, 2017	416	0.60
Sofia and Chrysta go on a stakeout in Wei-Ling to protect the Falcon's Eye, one of the items known as the Wicked Nine, from Prisma. Song: "Listen Up"
100	17	"The Mystic Isles: The Great Pretender"	Laurie Israel	Viki Anderson, Jill Colbert, and Eugene Salandra	November 3, 2017	419	0.59
For Sofia's last semester, she needs to find an animal helper to finish her project: making dragon fire. She invites Clover to be her helper, but other animals also wanted to be, so Sofia held a trail. Clover had been chosen as the helper with the help from a trove. Prisma also came to Sofia's school to find one of the Wicked Nine, the spinning wheel. Song: "Learn This Rhyme"
101	18	"The Mystic Isles: A Very Mystic Wassalia"	Matt Hoverman	Viki Anderson, John Pomeroy, and Aldina Dias	December 1, 2017	415	0.75
Chrysta voulenteers with Sofia during Wassalia to help those in need. Sofia later finds out that Chrysta was celebrating on her own, as she didn't have a family. Sofia finds all the people that Chrysta helped to come celebrate with her. Song: "That's What Wassalia's For"
102	19	"The Birthday Wish"	Matt Hoverman	Holly Forsyth, Kurt Anderson, and Eugene Salandra	January 5, 2018	408	0.86
Clover wakes Sofia early in the morning to celebrate her birthday. Sofia holds a birthday party but it becomes a disaster. Sofia make a wish to have another birthday party, and to make it great. Tizzy the Fairy grants her wish to live it over and over until she is happy. However, Tizzy makes a mistake with the spell, causing Sofia to keep repeating her birthday. The only way to break the spell is for Sofia to solve every problem at her birthday party. Song: "Going to be Great"
103	20	"In Cedric We Trust"	Laurie Israel	David Stephan, Lenord Robinson, Hank Tucker, and Viki Anderson	January 26, 2018	421	0.60
Cerdic had lost King Roland's trust since Cedric revealed his ambition of taking over the kingdom. He tries to gain it back. Prisma came to the kingdom to steal one of the Wicked Nine, a powerful crown called Grimhilde's Crown. When the crown is stolen by Wormwood, Sofia must find a way to retrieve it to save Cedric's reputation when suspicions fall on him. Song: "I Am on Your Side"
104	21	"The Mystic Isles: A Hero for the Hoodwinks"	Craig Carlisle	Chris Otsuki, Hank Tucker, and Doug McCarthy	February 16, 2018	424	0.64
After seeing Sofia being rewarded as a Protector, Clover takes her place on a mission in the Mystic Isles. Song: "The Bravest, Boldest, Bunny of All Time"
105	22	"The Mystic Isles: Undercover Fairies"	Matt Hoverman	Viki Anderson, Lonnie Lloyd, Eugene Salandra, Holly Forsyth, and Hank Tucker	March 2, 2018	425	0.51
To help protect a special, flower Sofia and Chrysta go undercover to take the "Fairy Test". When Sofia finds out that Chrysta failed the test, Sofia helps Chrysta prepare to pass the test. Song: "The Fairy Way"
106	23	"A Royal Wedding"	Rachel Ruderman	Eugene Salandra, Jill Colbert, Holly Forsyth, and Lonnie Lloyd	May 14, 2018	420	0.70
Aunt Tilly and Sir Bartleby are getting married. As heir to the throne, James has to greet the guests coming to the wedding, which he finds totally boring. However, Grand Mum points out that Amber is the real heir to the throne because she's seven minutes older. James becomes jealous and disappointed, so he does whatever it takes to make sure he becomes heir to the throne. Song: "Meant to Be"
107	24	"The Royal School Fair"	Eva Konstantopoulos	Holly Forsyth, Francis Glebas, and David Stephan	May 15, 2018	423	0.67
Royal Prep holds a fair for the students to choose what schools to go to next. Sofia has so much fun that she cannot decide what school to attend, which leads Amber and the others to put pressure on her. Song: "What You're Going to Do"
108	25	"The Lost Pyramid"	Matt Hoverman	Viki Anderson, Francis Glebas, Chris Otsuki, and David Stephan	May 16, 2018	426	0.51
When Princess Zooey announces that the Princess Adventure Club will have a "Scroll of Discoveries" posted up in the school, Hildegard realizes that she hasn't discovered anything memorable. When the Princess Adventure Club ventures off to the desert of Khaldoune, Hildegard tries to take all the credit of finding the lost pyramind for herself. Song: "Come to Your Senses With Me"
109	26	"Return to Merroway Cove"	Craig Carlisle	Eugene Salandra, Jill Colbert, Holly Forsyth, and Lonnie Lloyd	May 17, 2018	422	0.64
When the Royal family is invited to Merroway Cove for a celebration, Oona (the princess of Merroway Cove) is tired of being treated like a little kid, and she wants to prove that she's ready to make waves. But she accidentally uses her special comb to make a big undersea twister. Song: "When I Start to Make Some Waves"
110	27	"The Elf Situation"	Craig Carlisle	Kurt Anderson, Jill Colbert, Holly Forsyth, and Lenord Robinson	May 18, 2018	427	0.60
When the King takes the Royal staff on an appreciation picnic, Sofia, Amber, and James are left in charge. When the King is late, the trio must help with "The Elf Situation". Song: "You've Gotta Have Fun"
111	28	"Sofia the First: Forever Royal"	Craig Gerber & Michael G. Stern	Aldina Dias, Cathy Jones, David Stephan, Douglas McCarthy, Eugene Salandra, Hank Tucker, Holly Forsyth, Jill Colbert, John Poremoy, Kurt Anderson, Larry Leker, Lenord Robinson and Lonnie Lloyd	September 8, 2018	428	0.83
112	29	"Sofia the First: Forever Royal"	Craig Gerber & Michael G. Stern	Aldina Dias, Cathy Jones, David Stephan, Douglas McCarthy, Eugene Salandra, Hank Tucker, Holly Forsyth, Jill Colbert, John Poremoy, Kurt Anderson, Larry Leker, Lenord Robinson and Lonnie Lloyd	September 8, 2018	429	0.83
113	30	"Sofia the First: Forever Royal"	Craig Gerber & Michael G. Stern	Aldina Dias, Cathy Jones, David Stephan, Douglas McCarthy, Eugene Salandra, Hank Tucker, Holly Forsyth, Jill Colbert, John Poremoy, Kurt Anderson, Larry Leker, Lenord Robinson and Lonnie Lloyd	September 8, 2018	430	0.83
As Sofia, Amber and James prepare for their graduation from Royal Prep Academy, Sofia is called back to the Mystic Isles to face an evil witch named Vor who is trying to take over the kingdom of Enchancia. Songs: "A Big Day", "Royal Prep (reprise)", "Get Wicked!", "For One and All" and "On Your/My Own"
