= List of Elena of Avalor characters =

This is a list of the characters featured in the Disney Junior animated series, Elena of Avalor.

== Main ==
The main characters that are recurring across all Elena of Avalor franchise media.

=== Princess/Queen Elena ===
Princess Elena Castillo Flores (voiced by Aimee Carrero) is the Crown Princess of Avalor and the daughter of King Raul and Queen Lucia. At the beginning of the series, she is freed from a magical amulet in which she had been trapped by Shuriki following her parents' premature death. Her age ranges from 16 to 20 during the series (although her chronological age ranges from 57 to 61 due to her having been trapped in the amulet for 41 years). She has difficulty taking advice and often does things she wants to do without listening to others. On account of having been trapped in the amulet, she has magical abilities, such as making her royal scepter glow, seeing spirit animals, and talking to ghosts every November on Day of the Dead. In the season 3 episode “The Magic Within", she gains new magical powers that are controlled by her emotions after falling into a crystal well in Takaina. Elena is one of the princesses in the Disney World who can do combat, acrobatics, and a very hard technique-kip up. Some of her abilities include:

- Channeling magic through her scepter
- Fencing
- Flexibility, advanced acrobatics (a kip up during "Princess Knight" training, a leg split, and some rolls in several episodes)
- Basic combat skills

=== Princess Isabel ===
Princess Isabel Castillo Flores (voiced by Jenna Ortega) is the sister of Princess Elena who is also an inventor. Both are the daughters of the late King Raul and Queen Lucia. Isabel is very smart and brave, and assists her sister when she needs it. Her age ranges from 10 to 14.

=== Naomi Turner ===
Naomi Turner (voiced by Jillian Rose Reed) is a girl who is Elena's best friend, the daughter of Captain Turner, and a member of Elena's Grand Council. In "The Last Laugh", Naomi leaves Avalor to become a sailor, but returns in "Giant Steps". In the finale, Naomi becomes Elena's new chancellor.

=== Jaquins ===
Jaquins are a race of creatures that resemble jaguars with the wings and feathers of macaws. They come from the realm of Vallestrella where they train to help guard Avalor from various threats.

- Skylar (voiced by Carlos Alazraqui) is a fun-loving male Jaquin and the son of King Verago. He loves to play and seems to not take anything seriously. Whenever Elena needs help he will always be near.
- Migs (voiced by Chris Parnell) is a practical male Jaquin, who succeeds Zephyr as Chief of the Jaquins of Avalor. He is easily annoyed by his friends' antics.
- Luna (voiced by Yvette Nicole Brown) is a loud and brash female Jaquin who joined the guard. She is also a rebel which often gets her into trouble.

=== Gabe Núñez ===
Gabriel "Gabe" Núñez (voiced by Jorge Diaz) is Elena's close friend and captain of the Royal Guard, which he joined on the day that Elena became crown princess. His parents are bakers. In the book Elena of Avalor: The Essential Guide, it was revealed that Gabe has a secret crush on Elena.

=== Mateo ===
Mateo de Alva (voiced by Joseph Haro) is the royal wizard and Alacazar's grandson who is another one of Elena's closest friends. He can be shy at times, but is always there to help. In the last episode, Mateo playfully vies for Elena's attention, hinting that Mateo has a crush on Elena.

=== Chancellor Esteban ===
Chancellor Esteban (voiced by Christian Lanz) is Elena and Isabel's boastful maternal cousin and Chancellor of Avalor who is formerly part of Elena's Grand Council. His mother was the sister of Queen Lucia and they were the daughters of Luisa and Francisco. Unaware to anyone, he and his old friend Victor Delgado secretly helped Shuriki invade Avalor and he desperately desires to keep this secret out of fear of being rejected by his family. His secret is eventually exposed in "The Magic Within", leading Elena to imprison him for his betrayal, but he manages to escape along with the Delgado family and is now currently working with Ash. In "Captain Mateo", he gains magical powers after falling into the well of Takaina. In "Dreamcatcher", he finally lets go of his past (due to Elena no longer accepting him as a family member) and becomes a sworn ally to Ash and Zopilote. In "Coronation Day", it is revealed that the reason why he helped Shuriki in the first place is because he tried to warn his uncle King Raul of Shuriki's plot in the first place, but was ignored. He eventually reforms and helps Elena defeat the Four Shades of Awesome. Afterwards, Elena finally forgives him for his past crimes.

=== Francisco ===
Francisco Flores (voiced by Emiliano Díez) is Elena, Isabel, and Esteban's maternal grandfather. He is part of Elena's Grand Council.

=== Luisa ===
Luisa Flores (voiced by Julia Vera) is Elena, Isabel, and Esteban's maternal grandmother. She is part of Elena's Grand Council.

=== Armando ===
Armando Gutierrez (voiced by Joe Nunez)ref name="awn2016" /> is a frazzled castle servant who helps Elena on her journey to the throne.

== Recurring ==
=== Captain Daniel Turner ===
Captain Daniel Turner (voiced by Rich Sommer) is the harbormaster and Naomi's father.

=== Captain Scarlett Turner ===
Captain Scarlett Turner (voiced by Julie Nathanson) is a sea captain and Naomi's mother.

=== Rafa ===
Rafa de Alva (voiced by Ana Ortiz) is Mateo's mother and Alacazar's daughter.

=== Higgins ===
Higgins (voiced by Mikey Kelley) is a member of Avalor's Royal Guard. He regularly serves as Chancellor Esteban's personal assistant and confidante.

=== Doña Paloma ===
Doña Paloma (voiced by Constance Marie) is the magister of the trading guild, she is described by Esteban as the most important leader in Avalor. In "Navidad", it is revealed that Doña Paloma owns an emporium. In "Captain Mateo", she becomes Esteban's replacement on the Grand Council.

=== Carmen ===
Carmen Guzman (voiced by Justina Machado) is the co-owner of Cafe Angelica and the sister of Julio who works as a chef.

=== Julio ===
Julio Guzman (voiced by Jaime Camil) is the co-owner of Cafe Angelica, Magister of Trade and the brother of Carmen.

=== Jiku ===
Jiku (voiced by Lucas Grabeel) is the leader of the small magical creatures called the Noblins, who are known to transform into dogs and turn anything into gold.

=== Marlena ===
Marlena (voiced by Gaby Moreno) is a singer and Mateo's family friend.

=== Prince Alonso ===
Prince Alonso (voiced by Tyler Posey) is a charming, handsome prince of the kingdom of Córdoba. He is also selfish.

=== Charoca ===
Charoca (voiced by Tituss Burgess) is a Rocador, a creature made of rock, who can spew or cool down volcanic flames. He lives on a monfuego in the kingdom of Avalor.

=== Mingo, Zoom, and Estrella ===
Mingo (voiced by Desmond Gerber), Zoom (voiced by Maximus Riegel), and Estrella (voiced by Gia Lopez) are three baby Jaquins and Migs's children.

=== King Joaquín ===
King Joaquín (voiced by Echo Kellum) is the Ruler of the Kingdom of Cariza.

=== Nico ===
Nico (voiced by Wilber Zaldivar) is Skylar's younger brother.

=== Ciela and Avion ===
Ciela (voiced by Jenna Lea Rosen) and Avion (voiced by Lincoln Melcher) are young Jaquins and Nico's friends.

=== Chief Zephyr ===
Chief Zephyr (voiced by Jess Harnell) is the previous leader of Avalor's Jaquin Clan.

=== King Verago ===
King Verago (voiced by André Sogliuzzo) is the King of all the Jaquins and the father of Skylar and Nico.

=== Dulce ===
Dulce (voiced by Rosie Perez) is Migs' mate and the very calm mother of Mingo, Zoom, and Estrella.

=== Quita Moz ===
Quita Moz (voiced by Cheech Marin) is a sun bird and oracle that lives in Vallestrella.

=== Lama, Hool, and Qapa ===
Lama (voiced by Whoopi Goldberg), Hool (voiced by Cloris Leachman, and Qapa (voiced by Tony Plana) are three sun birds and friends of Quita Moz.

=== Cacahuate ===
Cacahuate (voiced by Richard Kind) is a spirit sloth and Mateo's chanul.

=== Bubo ===
Bubo (voiced by Max Mittelman) is a non-spirit monkey chanul who hopes to become a spirit guide but tends to give terrible advice to humans.

=== Flo ===
Flo (voiced by Kether Donohue) is an alpacamundi model brought to life by Elena's new magic.

=== Ixlan ===
Ixlan (voiced by Stephanie Beatriz) is the only living Maruvian and is also known as the Lightning Warrior.

== Villains ==
=== Shuriki ===
Shuriki (voiced by Jane Fonda) was the evil sorceress who had been the cause of Elena's 41-year imprisonment in the Amulet of Avalor and the killer of Elena and Isabel's parents, King Raul and Queen Lucia. She took over Avalor with the secret help of Esteban and Victor Delgado. She was defeated in Elena and the Secret of Avalor, and Elena took her rightful place as Avalor's Crowned Princess. Unfortunately, Shuriki went into hiding in a cottage in distant Avaloran lands and has been secretly working with Victor and his daughter Carla, whom she has been teaching powerful magic to in exchange for their help in taking back the kingdom. However, in the Season 2 special, "Song of the Sirenas", Shuriki is finally killed off for good by Elena, who used the Scepter of Light to finish her off. She is briefly seen in "Coronation Day" as a spirit watching Elena and Ash compete in an Olaball tournament.

=== Fiero ===
Fiero (voiced by Héctor Elizondo) is a Malvago. Long ago, Fiero was supposed to be the next Royal Wizard. However, King Raul appointed Alacazar instead, making Fiero angry. Fiero became an evil wizard looking for revenge. In "Spellbound" he goes to Mateo's Royal Wizard coronation to steal a magic book called the Codex Maru. But he was turned into a statue by Mateo. However, he was revived in "Rise of the Sorceress" by Shuriki and the Delgados and joined forces with them to take back the kingdom. In the "Song of the Sirenas" special, however, in a clash between Fiero and Mateo, the Malvago is turned into a statue once again by Mateo, freeing Avalor from the Malvago once more.

=== Orizaba ===
Orizaba (voiced by Eden Espinosa) is a moth fairy that appeared in "The Scepter of Light" where she tried to plunge the kingdom into darkness with the Eye of Midnight, but Elena managed to defeat her and destroy the Eye forever. She returns in "Finding Zuzo" where she captures Zuzo and attempts to steal his magic stripes in order to return to the mortal world and get revenge on Elena but is once again defeated after stumbling over the skin of a banana, causing her to fall into a pit of lava where she is forever gone into oblivion. She makes one final appearance in "Coronation Day" as a spirit where she competes in an Olaball tournament against Elena alongside Ash.

=== Troyo ===
Troyo (voiced by Grant George) is an evil magical coyote who appears in the episode, "Flight of the Jaquins". Long ago, he used to go around tricking people into doing bad stuff for him so he could be King of the Jungle. For this, the Jaquins kicked him out of the jungle. He captures two young Jaquins to force Chief Zephyr to make him King of the Jungle. But was defeated by Skylar and his brother Nico by trapping him with his own trap. He is then tied up in gold vines by the Noblins and taken away. He returns in "The Race for the Realm" where he joins forces with Shuriki after freeing Cruz from imprisonment and leaves the group in "A Tale of Two Scepters". He reappears in "Father-in-Chief" where he captures Chief Zephyr and Mingo and attempts to turn them into butterfrogs, but is foiled by Elena and friends and he himself is turned into a butterfrog instead, and later into a snurtle in "King Skylar" when he tries to turn back. In "Coronation Day", it is revealed that he recently died and is now working for the Grand Macaw as his right hand man. He later competes in an Olaball tournament against Elena alongside Ash.

=== Victor Delgado ===
Victor Delgado (voiced by Lou Diamond Phillips) who was the son of the royal treasurer until the day he and Esteban conspired together to help Shuriki take over Avalor. However, Victor and his family were banished from Avalor by Shuriki for years until Elena took the kingdom back. In "King of the Carnaval", Victor and his daughter Carla returned and tried to steal the jewels from the royal treasury until they were stopped and banished by Elena. Victor and Carla returned in "Elena of Avalor: Realm of the Jaquins" where they steal a powerful jewel from the Jaquin realm and free Marimonda, in the end Victor and Carla are revealed to be working for Shuriki to help her take over Avalor again in exchange for making them Malvagos. In "Song of the Sirenas", after Shuriki has been finally killed off by Princess Elena and Fiero is turned back into a statue by Mateo, Victor and Carla escape with Cruz, Vestia, and the jewel of the Scepter of Night and are currently still on the loose. After he and Carla are abandoned by Cruz and Vestia (due to Victor constantly insulting Cruz), they are later reunited with Ash, Victor's long lost wife. In "Not Without My Magic", after reconciling with Ash, he shows her the Scepter of Night's Jewel, who then plans to use it to take over Avalor alongside her husband and daughter. In "Naomi Knows Best", he is captured after a failed attempt to steal Elena's magic while Ash and Carla escape, vowing to come back for him later. In "The Magic Within", he and his family escape with Esteban's help, but he and Carla are abandoned by Ash due to her refusing to let go of her obsession of power (with the latter being turned into a statue in the process), leaving them to be recaptured. He later reforms in "The Lighting Warrior" (having been returned to normal by Mateo) alongside Carla and become allies to Elena. In "Coronation Day", he takes part in the battle against Ash and the Four Shades of Awesome.

=== Carla Delgado ===
Carla Delgado (voiced by Myrna Velasco) is the daughter of Victor Delgado. She has spent time undercover in the Avalor palace as Rita, and is reunited with her long-lost mother in "Snow Place Like Home". In "To Save a Sunbird", she is captured by Elena when attempting to rescue Victor. In "The Magic Within", she and her parents escape with Esteban's help, but she and Victor are abandoned by Ash due to her refusing to let go of her obsession of power, leaving them to be recaptured. She and Victor later reform in "The Lighting Warrior" and become allies to Elena. In "Coronation Day", she takes part in the battle against Ash and the Four Shades of Awesome.

=== Marimonda ===
Marimonda (voiced by Noël Wells) is an evil mythical forest sprite who appeared in the special, "Elena of Avalor: Realm of the Jaquins". She is released by Victor and Carla Delgado and sent to Avalor to destroy it with her vines. Elena manages to catch her by trapping her in a magic jar and sent back to the Jaquin realm.

=== Cruz ===
Cruz (voiced by Mario Lopez) is a Jaquin who was next in line to be the new chief of Avalor's Jaquin clan. He first appeared in "A Spy in the Palace", while his major role was in "Shapeshifters" where Chief Zephyr takes away his position due to him not listening and refusing to learn. Angered, he locks Chief Zephyr in a cave and frames Elena and her friends for his disappearance. Elena managed to free Zephyr and clear her name, then she helped catch Cruz and lock him up for treason. Cruz swore he would return with the help of his sister. He returns in "The Race for the Realm" (having been freed by Troyo), where he and Vestia join forces with Shuriki. As of "Song of the Sirenas", after Elena killed off Shuriki and Mateo turned Fiero back into a statue, Cruz and his sister escape with Victor and Carla Delgado with the Scepter of Night's Jewel in their possession. He and Vestia abandon Victor and Carla in "Snow Place Like Home" due to Victor constantly insulting him and later redeem themselves in "Not Without My Magic". In "Coronation Day", he takes part in the battle against Ash and the Four Shades of Awesome.

=== Vestia ===
Vestia (voiced by Diane Guerrero) is a Jaquin and the twin sister of Cruz. She and her brother join forces with Shuriki in "The Race for the Realm" after Troyo breaks Cruz out of prison. As of "Song of the Sirenas", after Elena killed off Shuriki and Mateo turned Fiero back into a statue, Vestia and her brother escape with Victor and Carla Delgado with the Scepter of Night's Jewel in their possession. She and her brother abandon Victor and Carla in "Snow Place Like Home" due to Victor constantly insulting Cruz and later redeem themselves in "Not Without My Magic". In "Coronation Day", she takes part in the battle against Ash and the Four Shades of Awesome.

=== Duke Cristóbal ===
Duke Cristóbal (voiced by Javier Muñoz) is Elena's cousin and the ruler of Nueva Vesta who appears in the Season 2 special, "Song of the Sirenas". He is later revealed to be in allegiance with Shuriki, having agreed to help her take over Avalor in exchange for gold. After Shuriki's defeat, he is captured and arrested for betraying his own family.

=== Malandros ===
Malandros are evil shapeshifting dolphin-like creatures who are known enemies to the sirenas. They first appear in "The Tides of Change". When Daria is reluctant to make peace with the humans, she makes a deal with the Malandros to prevent the signing of the peace treaty between humans and sirenas, only for the Malandros to double cross her and take over the sirenas' kingdom after destroying all the coral alarms used to keep the Malandros away. Elena and her friends manage to help the sirenas defeat the Malandros by repairing one of the coral alarms, which drives them away.

=== Ash Delgado ===
Ash Delgado (voiced by Grey Griffin) is Victor's wife and Carla's mother who is a Malvago, and the main antagonist of Season 3. She reunites with her family in "Snow Place Like Home" and it's revealed in "Not Without My Magic" that she was training to be a Malvago for ten years. She and Victor keep arguing over her not returning to the family for years (Victor's side) and him not waiting for her with Carla (Ash's side), but they reconcile when Victor shows Ash the Scepter of Night's Jewel. Ash then decides to use it to become the most powerful Malvago in the world and overthrow Princess Elena alongside Victor and Carla. In "Naomi Knows Best", she works with her family to steal Elena's magic but are foiled, resulting in the Scepter of Night's Jewel being destroyed and Victor being captured. She is eventually captured in "The Magic Within", but she and her family manage to escape with Esteban's help. When Victor and Carla finally decide not to help her anymore, she abandons her family and leaves with Esteban. In "Captain Mateo", she works with her mentor Zopilote to help teach Esteban (who eventually becomes an ally to them in "Dreamcatcher") how to use his new magical powers. Following Zopilote's defeat in "Spirit of the Wizard", she and Esteban attempt to assemble an army of magical people to take over Avalor. In "Coronation Day", after falling into the dark side of the spirit world with Elena following the release of the Four Shades of Awesome, she competes against Elena in a game of Olaball in an attempt to return to the mortal world. After Elena learns that whoever wins the game must stay in the spirit world, she intentionally loses, allowing her to return to the mortal/the ever realm world while Ash remains trapped in the spirit world.

=== Sanza ===
Sanza (voiced by Taye Diggs) is a rogue green jaguar spirit guide who first appears in "Flower of Light" where he attempts to destroy the portal that connects the mortal and spirit world and bribes Felicia and Guillermo into helping him. Although he succeeds, Elena and friends manage to restore the portal with Felicia's help. He is then captured and arrested by Zuzo. He is briefly seen in "Coronation Day" watching Elena and Ash compete in an Olaball tournament.

=== Zopilote ===
Zopilote (voiced by Tony Shalhoub) is Ash's mentor who trained her how to be a Malvago and first appears in "Sister of Invention". He can transform into a vulture. In "Captain Mateo", he and Ash help train Esteban (who soon becomes an ally in "Dreamcatcher") with his newly acquired magical powers. In "Spirit of a Wizard", he is transformed into an ordinary bird after a failed attempt to steal Elena's scepter with Ash and Esteban. In "Coronation Day", it is revealed that he recently died prior to the episode. He later competes in an Olaball tournament against Elena alongside Ash.

=== Tito ===
Tito (voiced by Anthony Ramos) is a bandit who first appears in "Team Isa". He can mind-control people by playing his magic guitar. After taking control of Elena and her friends, Isabel works with her friends to help foil his scheme and break his guitar, freeing Elena and friends from his control. He is then captured and arrested for his crimes.

=== Chatana ===
Chatana (voiced by Gina Torres) is an evil sorceress with wings who first appears in "The Last Laugh" where she is unwillingly freed from her prison by Elena and Mateo. After meeting Ash and Esteban, she joins forces with them in their quest to take over Avalor in exchange for the return of her magical diadem. She meets her defeat in "Coronation Day".

- Pili (voiced by Tom Kenny) is Chatana's talking pet Weasel.

=== The Four Shades of Awesome ===
The Four Shades of Awesome (originally named The Shadows of the Night), Vuli (voiced by Mark Hamill), Hetz (voiced by Andy García), Yolo (voiced by Fred Armisen), and Cahu (voiced by Jenny Slate) are a group of four evil deities who were imprisoned in the dark side of the spirit world. They only appear in "Coronation Day". After being freed by Ash, they proceeded to wreak havoc in Avalor until they were stopped by Elena and Esteban and are returned to the spirit world.
