= List of Young & Hungry episodes =

Young & Hungry is an American television sitcom created by David Holden, and executively produced by Ashley Tisdale. The multi-camera series stars Emily Osment, Jonathan Sadowski, Aimee Carrero, Kym Whitley and Rex Lee, with the series premiering on Freeform (then known as ABC Family) on June 25, 2014.

On October 24, 2016, Osment announced via Twitter that Young & Hungry had been renewed for a fifth season. It was confirmed by Emily Osment on February 6, 2018, that the show is ending after the final 10 episodes of season 5, sometime in 2018. It was confirmed by TVLine on March 15, 2018, that there is a TV movie planned that will premiere sometime after the series ends to officially conclude the show and "will further the adventures of Gabi, Josh and their circle of friends". Part 2 of season 5 premiered on June 20, 2018.

During the course of the series, 71 episodes of Young & Hungry aired over five seasons.

== Series overview ==
Season	Episodes		Originally released	
Season	Episodes		First released	Last released
1	10		June 25, 2014	August 27, 2014
2	20		March 25, 2015	October 14, 2015
Special			November 24, 2015	
3	10		February 3, 2016	April 6, 2016
4	10		June 1, 2016	August 3, 2016
5	20	10	March 13, 2017	May 22, 2017
5	20	10	June 20, 2018	July 25, 2018

== Episodes ==
=== Season 1 (2014) ===
No. overall	No. in season	Title	Directed by	Written by	Original release date	Prod. code	U.S. viewers (millions)
1	1	"Pilot"	Andy Cadiff	David Holden	June 25, 2014	1001	1.09
Gabi Diamond, a food blogger in her early 20s, applies for a job as a personal chef for Josh Kaminski, a successful 29-year-old tech entrepreneur. Josh plans on proposing to his girlfriend, Caroline (Mallory Jansen), until she breaks things off before his proposal is due. Gabi comforts her boss only to end up in bed with him. Yolanda and Elliot confront her the next morning, and she is hired for the position, which Elliot resents.
2	2	"Young & Ringless"	Phill Lewis	David Holden	July 2, 2014	1002	0.77
It is Gabi' first official day as Josh's chef, and Elliot tells her to prepare a Chinese meal for Chinese investors flying in from Shanghai. Caroline's engagement ring goes missing, and she accuses Gabi. When Josh and Caroline go to check the footage, Elliot reveals he tried on the ring and it became stuck, fortunately Yolanda gets it off before Josh and Caroline come back. However Caroline becomes more suspicious and decides to check the footage from the minute Gabi walked into the house for the first time, almost giving away that Gabi and Josh had sex together. Josh convinces Caroline not to watch the tape, and also forces her to come to dinner. Gabi makes spaghetti and meatballs, figuring the investors are sick of Chinese food. The investors applaud at the spaghetti, and the dinner is a success. In the end, Josh finds out Elliot tried on the ring, but instead of firing him, he just laughs.
3	3	"Young & Lesbian"	Arlene Sanford	Jenny Lee	July 9, 2014	1004	0.91
Elliot is desperate to help Josh make the top list of Logan Rawlings' (Ashley Tisdale) list in her magazine. When they invite her for dinner, Logan is more interested in Gabi, forcing Elliot to set up a date for the two in hopes of securing Josh at the top spot on the magazine's "30 Under 30" list.
4	4	"Young & Pregnant"	Robbie Countryman	Andrea Abbate	July 16, 2014	1003	0.90
Gabi discovers she might be pregnant with Josh's baby after their one-night stand. Yolanda discovers the pregnancy test and instantly assumes Caroline is pregnant. She tells Elliot and they both race to tell Josh the news first. Josh and Gabi end up talking about their situation.
5	5	"Young & Younger"	Andy Cadiff	Caryn Lucas	July 23, 2014	1005	0.76
Hoping Gabi will forget about Josh, Sofia encourages her to date again. She meets Cam (Nick Roux), and they soon begin dating. Jealous, Josh immediately takes a disliking to the guy. Josh discovers astonishing news about him and tells Gabi. She initially does not believe but decides to confront Cam anyway, only to discover even more worrisome news.
6	6	"Young & Punchy"	Andy Cadiff	Michael Dow & Devon Kelly	July 30, 2014	1006	0.33
Josh hires Cooper (Jesse McCartney), a computer hacker to work for him. But when Cooper puts his romantic moves on Gabi, Josh's jealous feelings start to show and he tells Gabi that she can't date Cooper. However, they decide to date in secret anyway. Josh has a new bathtub put in for Caroline, with her to be the first one to use it. However, Elliot and Yolanda schemes to use it for themselves.
7	7	"Young & Secret"	Andy Cadiff	Ali Schouten & Ryan Shankel	August 6, 2014	1007	0.85
Gabi convinces Cooper to pretend date Sofia, in hopes of keeping their relationship a secret. Things take a weird turn when Sofia actually befriends Caroline and they attempt to attend a Lorde concert together. Gabi is left jealous. Meanwhile, Elliot and Yolanda try out a diet together.
8	8	"Young & Car-less"	Phill Lewis	Lucas Brown Eyes	August 13, 2014	1008	0.89
Gabi's car breaks down, and Josh replaces it with a new one. Gabi is angered by this, revealing that it was the last memory she had of her mother. Josh is determined to make things right and take back the car. Meanwhile, Yolanda and Elliot are upset that their boss treats them differently compared to Gabi.
9	9	"Young & Getting Played"	Anthony Rich	Ali Schouten & Ryan Shankel	August 20, 2014	1009	0.85
Yolanda's son Derek (Maestro Harrell) returns to see his mother, Yolanda, after breaking up with his girlfriend, Cheryl (Sasha Compère). Gabi discovers they broke up because of his mother's disapproval. Gabi comes up with a plan, after Yolanda declares her too much of a mess for her son, and wants to set him up with Sofia. Meanwhile, Caroline temporarily moves in with Josh, but it leads to Josh visioning what their lives will be after they marry.
10	10	"Young & Thirty (...and getting married!)"	Phill Lewis	David Holden	August 27, 2014	1010	1.02
Josh and Caroline's wedding is pushed further ahead than planned. Despite this, Gabi is excited to present him with his birthday gift. Caroline clearly forgets about her fiancé's birthday, and Gabi sacrifices her gift for Caroline. When Josh reacts to the gift, Gabi contemplates whether she should tell Josh the truth or not.

=== Season 2 (2015) ===
No. overall	No. in season	Title	Directed by	Written by	Original release date	Prod. code	U.S. viewers (millions)
11	1	"Young & Too Late"	Anthony Rich	Caryn Lucas	March 25, 2015	2001	0.77
After canceling his wedding with Caroline and failing to profess his love to Gabi, Josh has a one-night stand with a blonde. Gabi agrees to go on a three-week trip to China with Cooper, despite still having conflicting feelings for Josh.
12	2	"Young & Cookin'"	Andy Cadiff	Jenny Lee	April 1, 2015	2002	0.73
Gabi returns from her three-week trip to China, with Josh now having a new girlfriend named Jilly who is also a great cook and is a threat to Gabi's job. Yolanda goes on a date with the building window washer, who she later finds out that is deaf.
13	3	"Young & Munchies"	Katy Garretson	David Holden	April 8, 2015	2003	0.76
Gabi and Sofia are rather disappointed that their current careers haven't gotten as far as they hoped. Consequently, Gabi attempts to contact Logan Rawlings to write a food article in her magazine. After getting refused for her food choices, Logan agrees to let her cook with a certain ingredient. Sofia decides to get a higher job and manages to a plan an interview with her boss. Meanwhile, Elliot learns that Yolanda makes more money than him, but he struggles to ask Josh for a raise.
14	4	"Young & Old"	Michael J. Shea	Andrea Abbate	April 15, 2015	2004	0.68
As Elliot's 40th birthday approaches, his boyfriend breaks up with him upon finding out Elliot's real age from Gabi. To make things right, Gabi sets Elliot up with old college classmate. Meanwhile, Yolanda makes a plan to teach her ex-husband Coleman (Cedric Yarbrough), a lesson after he cheated on her with a younger woman. She eventually begins to fall for her ex-husband again.
15	5	"Young & First Time"	Linda Mendoza	Michael Dow & Devon Kelly	April 22, 2015	2005	0.77
Gabi and Cooper finally decide to consummate their relationship, until Cooper finds out that Gabi and Josh slept together. Josh is worried about Yolanda's rekindled relationship with her ex-husband Coleman.
16	6	"Young & Moving"	Joe Nussbaum	Jonathan Schmock	April 29, 2015	2006	0.60
Josh's new and much older girlfriend Shauna (Kylie Minogue), is hiding a secret from him. Gabi and Sofia have planned a way to get the new larger apartment recently put to rent when the Dmitri (Jim Pirri), their landlord shows feelings for Yolanda.
17	7	"Young & Ferris Wheel"	Katy Garretson	Jenny Lee	May 6, 2015	2007	0.57
Gabi's late mother's birthday approaches and after finding out that Shauna hasn't spoken to her adult daughter Danielle (Abbie Cobb) in years, Gabi goes out of her way to reunite the mother and daughter. However, a secret involving Josh may ruin the reunion. Meanwhile, Elliot asks Yolanda to watch him sleep to see how he behaves in bed.
18	8	"Young & Sandwich"	Jean Sagal	Cindy Appel	May 13, 2015	2008	0.59
Gabi sets Sofia up with Ruben, a "man in a suit". Once Sofia leaves with joy, Gabi finds out that Ruben works as a sandwich. Yolanda announces that she is dating a guy named Marco, who used to date Elliot. Meanwhile, Josh admits he still has feelings for Gabi, after being conflicted about Caroline's engagement announcement.
19	9	"Young & Pretty Woman"	Andy Cadiff	Caryn Lucas	May 20, 2015	2009	0.97
Gabi contemplates between Josh and Cooper when Josh finally admits to having feelings for Gabi. Cooper, feeling rejected, reveals the truth to Gabi about Josh. Meanwhile, Allan opens a karaoke bar, which Elliot disagrees with, and proposes to his boyfriend, having regret not doing this twenty years ago.
20	10	"Young & Part Two"	Alfonso Ribeiro	David Holden	May 27, 2015	2010	0.93
Gabi plans to quit her job with Josh, to audition for an elite 6-month internship in Switzerland.
21	11	"Young & How Gabi Got Her Job Back"	Katy Garretson	Devon Kelly & Mike Dow	August 19, 2015	2011	0.85
Gabi returns from Switzerland and still has unresolved feelings concerning Josh. While Gabi was gone, Josh hired a new chef named Adriana (B.K. Cannon). Gabi is hired as the new chef for Kal (Satya Bhabha), a tech entrepreneur about to make a huge business deal with Josh.
22	12	"Young & Back to Normal"	Katy Garretson	Ali Schouten & Ryan Shankel	August 26, 2015	2012	0.60
With pressure from Sofia, Gabi decides to date Tyler (Keegan Allen), a rock drummer, to get over her the awkwardness of working for Josh again. In turn, Gabi sets up Josh with Sarah (Alexis Carra), a woman living in Gabi and Sofia's building. After agreeing to go on a double date with their new matches, Josh learns that Tyler is actually homeless, and Gabi discovers that Sarah collects human teeth. Elliot has Yolanda be the caller at a bingo game, not telling her that the caller has to be a drag queen.
23	13	"Young & Unemployed"	Andy Cadiff	Andrea Abbate	September 2, 2015	2013	0.71
After being passed over for a promotion at the law firm where she works, Sofia quits her job. Gabi then tries to convince Josh to hire Sofia for a paid internship. But when Josh decides to go with a different applicant, Gabi lies to Sofia saying she got the job, seeing how devastated she is after Ruben breaks up with her. Gabi tries to keep up the facade so Josh and Sofia will not find out. Elliot's mother (Jodi Long) visits thinking that Elliot and Josh are a couple.
24	14	"Young & Oh Brother"	Andy Cadiff	Lucas Brown Eyes	September 9, 2015	2020	0.76
Sofia's younger brother Benji stays over at the Gabi and Sofia's apartment, looking a lot more handsome from the last time Gabi saw him, with Gabi immediately having a crush on him. However, Sofia is completely against the idea of Benji and Gabi dating. Benji is also harboring a big secret, that will affect Gabi's crush on him. Meanwhile, Josh and Yolanda throw a last minute bachelor party for Elliot.
25	15	"Young & Earthquake"	Andy Cadiff	David Holden	September 16, 2015	2015	0.60
Seeking advice from a psychic named Madame Paulette (Cleo King), Gabi and Sofia get caught up in the crazy premonitions. After an earthquake hits San Francisco, Josh becomes terribly afraid of stepping into an elevator. Alan and Elliot want to have a child.
26	16	"Young & How Sofia Got Her Groove Back"	Andy Cadiff	Ryan Shankel & Ali Schouten and Lucas Brown Eyes	September 23, 2015	2018	0.81
Still discouraged about being unemployed, Gabi brings Sofia along for a night of hotel and spa enjoyment. Sofia then has a one-night stand with a stranger, with the guy leaving Sofia an envelope of money thinking that she is a prostitute. Elliot and Yolanda take a spin class to get a picture with Jake Gyllenhaal. Josh dates the instructor of Elliot and Yolanda's spin class, who he later thinks is only into men with large male endowment, making Josh insecure.
27	17	"Young & Trashy"	Phill Lewis	Diana Snyder	September 23, 2015	2014	0.68
Gabi gets a last-minute gift for Josh to celebrate his new app launching. At a thrift shop, Gabi and Sofia buy him a black turtleneck, à la Steve Jobs, to give Josh confidence. Only to find out that the turtleneck actually did belong to Steve Jobs and is worth a lot, with Gabi and Sofia doing all they can to get it back. Josh is creeped out by a look-a-like bobblehead that Yolanda gave him.
28	18	"Young & Doppelgänger"	Andy Cadiff	Peter Marc Jacobson	September 30, 2015	2017	0.78
In order to pay for a very expensive blender, Gabi temporarily rents out her and Sofia's apartment without Sofia's consent to Gracie (Kimberley Crossman) and Sam (Josie Loren), best friends who are vacationing for the San Francisco Gay Pride Parade. This disagreement between Gabi and Sofia causes a rift in their friendship. Meanwhile, Josh is out of town to give an ED Talk (a parody of TED Talk). Everything goes well for Josh until a fellow speaker steals his corny joke, leading to embarrassing results. Elliot and Yolanda get worn out from celebrating Gay Pride.
29	19	"Young & Younger Brother, Part 1"	Andy Cadiff	Caryn Lucas	October 14, 2015	2019	0.63
Josh's younger brother Jake (Jayson Blair), who has had trouble keeping a career goal in the past, decides he wants be a chef. Josh asks that Gabi let Jake learn from her, despite the fact that Gabi is tasked with the responsibility of making the appetizers for Alan and Elliot's wedding. Gabi and Jake soon fall for each other, with Josh once again questioning his romantic feelings for Gabi. Elliot becomes annoyed at Alan deciding every aspect of the wedding. Yolanda loses Elliot's wedding ring. Jake forgoes Josh's insistence on going to a prestigious culinary arts school and spends the money instead on a food truck for himself and Gabi, much to Josh's chagrin.
30	20	"Young & Younger Brother, Part 2"	Andy Cadiff	David Holden	October 14, 2015	2021	0.55
Alan and Elliot must prove to Rabbi Shapiro (Joel Brooks) that they are fit to be married.

=== Special (2015) ===
No. overall	Title	Directed by	Written by	Original release date	Prod. code	U.S. viewers (millions)
31	"Young & Christmas"	Katy Garretson	Cindy Appel	November 24, 2015	2016	0.55
Gabi wants Yolanda to make up with her sister, Jolanda (Jackée Harry), this Christmas, but later is tricked by her sister into believing she is homeless and causing Yolanda to be conned by her sister and her boyfriend Gary (Phil LaMarr). Sofia feels guilty about not speaking up about getting an undeserved discount on expensive bag from Matilda (Mindy Sterling), an incompetent cashier. Elliot feels lonely on Christmas, with Alan out spending time with his family on a Jewish cruise.

=== Season 3 (2016) ===
No. overall	No. in season	Title	Directed by	Written by	Original release date	Prod. code	U.S. viewers (millions)
32	1	"Young & The Next Day"	Andy Cadiff	Caryn Lucas	February 3, 2016	301	0.65
While traveling to Coachella, both Josh and Gabi fantasize about each other. When the truck breaks down, Gabi calls Sofia and confesses her feelings for Josh. Josh, overhearing the conversation, follows Gabi to Yermo with Sofia. Just missing her, they finally find her at Coachella and Josh admits his feelings for her. Gabi responds by kissing him, reuniting the couple. Meanwhile, Yolanda deals with Elliot and Alan when they return from their honeymoon.
33	2	"Young & Coachella"	Andy Cadiff	David Holden	February 10, 2016	302	0.53
While still at Coachella, Gabi and Josh plan on consummating their relationship as a couple. Despite having just been dumped by Gabi, Jake says that he is perfectly fine with Gabi and Josh being together now. He gives both Gabi and Josh terrible sex advice, subconsciously trying to sabotage their relationship. Yolanda injures her back; Alan wants to tend to her every need, while Elliot is not as sympathetic.
34	3	"Young & First Date"	Andy Cadiff	Jenny Lee	February 17, 2016	303	0.60
Having driven all night to get back to Josh's home, he and Gabi wake up the next morning to find that they never did consummate their relationship. Instead of getting intimate right then and there, they decide to "create the perfect night," starting with a first official date. Meanwhile, Yolanda, fearing that she is pregnant, accidentally takes a menopause test – which turns out positive, to her dismay. She lies to Elliot, saying that she is indeed pregnant, when she sees how well he treats her. Sofia tries to figure out how to tell Gabi that she hooked up with Jake at Coachella.
35	4	"Young & Parents"	Andy Cadiff	Mike Dow & Devon Kelly	February 24, 2016	304	0.62
Gabi prepares to have the perfect dinner with Josh, until his booze-hound mother Kathy (Cheryl Hines) shows up unexpectedly. She brings with her accusations of Gabi being a gold digger. Gabi's dad Nick (Jerry O'Connell) then shows up to defend his daughter against Kathy's rude comments. A romance unexpectedly blossoms between Kathy and Nick, much to the shock of both Gabi and Josh. Meanwhile, Sofia feels that Elliot, Yolanda, and herself were discriminated against after they are thrown out of a movie theater.
36	5	"Young & Therapy"	Andy Cadiff	Andrea Abbate	March 2, 2016	305	0.44
Gabi comes up with a plot to get Josh to see Dr. Jessica Rounds (Briana Lane), a therapist, so she can overhear the session from the nail salon she frequents, located right underneath the therapist's office. Elliot gets hit on by a handsome masseur, and almost gives in to his advances – until Yolanda guilts him about his actions.
37	6	"Young & Rachael Ray"	Andy Cadiff	Ali Schouten & Ryan Shankel	March 9, 2016	306	0.53
Gabi takes a two-week leave from working for Josh to start a food truck business with Sofia. With both Gabi and Sofia having recently been dumped, they create a food truck business that caters to other dumped girls. Elliot manages to get Gabi and Sofia on to Rachael Ray's talk show. As a part of his continued therapy, Josh agrees to make amends with Ella (Brittany Ishibashi), his original high school prom date, whom he ditched for someone else at the last minute.
38	7	"Young & Rob'd"	Andy Cadiff	Lucas Brown Eyes	March 16, 2016	307	0.52
Gabi falls for Rob (Andy Favreau), a guy she first meets as he's removing money from a fundraising jar at her nail salon. Sophia then suspects that he is bad news, and does not agree with Gabi dating him. Gabi dismisses her concerns. Josh starts journaling to express his thoughts as part of his continued therapy homework. Elliot becomes desperate to know what Josh has written about him.
39	8	"Young & Clippy" "Young & Getting Real"	Andy Cadiff	Lucas Brown Eyes	March 23, 2016	310	0.45
The Young & Hungry cast looks back at notable moments from past episodes, and answer questions from the studio audience.
40	9	"Young & Lottery"	Andy Cadiff	Diana Snyder	March 30, 2016	308	0.49
Gabi continues to date other guys, and her latest date turns out to be a perverted sleaze. Sofia, Elliot and Yolanda put their money together to buy a Pottery lottery ticket. Josh has a sexual dream about his therapist, Dr. Rounds. After losing the karaoke bar to high rent costs, Alan designs Josh's office, despite having no prior designing experience.
41	10	"Young & No More Therapy"	Andy Cadiff	Diana Snyder	April 6, 2016	309	0.54
Josh is overwhelmed after Dr. Rounds kissed and admits her feelings for him even though he still likes Gabi. After learning he won the Australian award for "Digital Innovation in Next Gen Optimization" he decides to take advantage of the opportunity to clear his mind and go to the award ceremony in Sydney. Elliot and Alan plan to recreate their honeymoon by going to Maui, Hawaii and ask Yolanda to join them in order to split the costs.

=== Season 4 (2016) ===
No. overall	No. in season	Title	Directed by	Written by	Original release date	Prod. code	U.S. viewers (millions)
42	1	"Young & Hawaii"	Andy Cadiff	Caryn Lucas	June 1, 2016	4001	0.53
After discovering that Josh's therapist Jessica had joined him on his trip to Australia, Gabi meets Adam (Tyler Ritter), who was dumped at the altar, and they agree to make their significant others jealous by going on Adam's honeymoon in Hawaii. Meanwhile, Elliot, Alan and Yolanda go on their "throuple" honeymoon in order to take advantage of a free three-day hotel stay.
43	2	"Young & Hurricane"	Andy Cadiff	Mike Dow & Devon Kelly	June 8, 2016	4002	0.56
Continuing from the previous episode, Gabi is thrilled when Josh decides that he is ready for a relationship with her, until she and Adam – whose ex-fiancee Amanda (Kelen Coleman) has returned to get him back – have developed feelings for each other and Josh unknowingly books a hotel room next to Adam's. Meanwhile, Elliot is upset that Yolanda saved him from drowning while Alan didn't.
44	3	"Young & Fried"	Phill Lewis	Jenny Lee	June 15, 2016	4005	0.65
A month has past since the events in Hawaii. Gabi has found work at a local diner as a fry cook while Josh has gained weight from eating a lot. Neither one of them has spoken to each other since. Meanwhile, Yolanda wants to invite Gabi and Sophia to her 50th birthday party of which Josh is hosting. To prevent each other from discovering their personal downfalls, Gabi claims to be working for famous chef Giada De Laurentiis, and Josh wears a girdle to hide his weight gain.
45	4	"Young & Piggy"	Phill Lewis	Ryan Shankel	June 22, 2016	4006	0.63
Sophia begins working at the diner where Gabi works. Gabi is then promoted to manager by the diner owner Mr. Fancy (Paul Dooley), despite the fact that Sophia is more qualified, causing animosity between the two women. Yolanda helps Elliot prepare for camping trip with Alan, by camping out on Josh's terrace.
46	5	"Young & Fostered"	Andy Cadiff	Andrea Abbate	June 29, 2016	4007	0.52
Alan and Elliot adopt a child, expecting it to be a baby, but turns out to be a wisecracking thirteen-year old girl named Keisha (Demi Mills). From dialing her deceased mother's cell phone number, Gabi finds her new "soulmate", a freelance music journalist.
47	6	"Young & Assistant"	Andy Cadiff	Ryan Shankel	July 6, 2016	4004	0.56
Josh hires Randall (Charlie Saxton), a very attentive assistant who is an annoyance to Gabi, Elliot and Yolanda. Sofia dates Rick (Gregg Sulkin), an aspiring British rock star.
48	7	"Young & Bowling"	Andy Cadiff	David Holden	July 13, 2016	4003	0.57
Gabi wins a cooking contest with a recipe from her estranged Aunt Chris. In order to get the prize money, Gabi has to make an amends with her aunt, later discovering that her Aunt Chris is now living as a man (Ian Harvie). Josh is forced to revisit his childhood trauma of bowling and Elliot includes himself in a poker game with Yolanda's friends who are all recovering gamblers.
49	8	"Young & Sofia"	Andy Cadiff	David Holden	July 20, 2016	4010	0.44
Sofia applies for the assistant position for Logan Rawlings, who is now the head of a media news company. To secure her position with the company, Sofia promises to get Logan the exclusive story on Rooster, an elusive graffiti artist. Sofia's new co-workers Leo (Ryan Pinkston), who quickly develops a crush on her, and Kendrick (Steve Talley), who Sofia quickly develops a crush on, help her with her quandary.
50	9	"Young & Matched"	Andy Cadiff	Emily Ann Brandstetter	July 27, 2016	4008	0.51
Gabi signs up for speed dating at the local diner and argues with Josh about the fact that he only gets dates because he is rich. Josh then makes a claim that Gabi only gets dates because she is attractive. Josh then signs up to speed date as well, with him making a bet with Gabi about who can get an actual date faster, while also not being honest about their true selves with their dates. Meanwhile, Elliot is finding it difficult to bond with Keisha, so he asks Yolanda and Sofia for help.
51	10	"Young & Screwed"	Andy Cadiff	Gina Gold & Aurorae Khoo	August 3, 2016	4009	0.53
Gabi and Josh sleep together. They then swear off sleeping with each other ever again, until the building where Gabi, Sofia and Yolanda live, is being fumigated for termites, and they all agree stay in Josh's penthouse for the weekend, causing increased sexual tension between Gabi and Josh. Keisha is taken by long lost relatives, leaving Elliot heartbroken, and with Alan left to comfort him.

=== Season 5 (2017–18) ===
No. overall	No. in season	Title	Directed by	Written by	Original release date	Prod. code	U.S. viewers (millions)
52	1	"Young & Punch Card"	Andy Cadiff	David Holden	March 13, 2017	5001	0.49
Gabi and Josh agree to a casual sex relationship using punching cards, with ten punchable holes for each of their cards. Sofia then warns Gabi that she will be unable to have a sexual relationship without feelings involved, with Sofia being proven right when both Gabi and Josh think that they are seeing other people. Yolanda uses cheap detergent to wash Josh's clothes further causing confusion for Gabi and Josh's relationship. Sofia is desperate to date Kendrick, so she pretends that Gabi's cooking is her own.
53	2	"Young & Valentine's Day"	Andy Cadiff	Rachel Sweet	March 20, 2017	5004	0.36
After agreeing not to get each other anything for Valentine's Day, Josh steals a dinner reservation at a fancy restaurant for Gabi. The reservation, however, was set for a doctor proposing to his girlfriend, Gabi then sees the engagement ring and thinks that Josh is proposing to her. This leads to Gabi getting advice from Ms. Wilson (Betty White), her downstairs neighbor who wears her wedding dress every Valentine's Day to remember her dead husband(s). Meanwhile, Alan gets Elliot a Gabi prepared-Valentine's Day gift, however, Elliot did not get Alan a gift. Sofia and Yolanda await a stripper for a fun night at Gabi's place.
54	3	"Young & Kiki"	Andy Cadiff	Lucas Brown Eyes	March 27, 2017	5007	0.43
Gabi crashes Josh's meeting with Natasha Cook-Campbell (Heather Dubrow), a celebrity chef and lifestyle guru, who is also Gabi's idol. After Gabi helps Josh close a deal with Natasha, Gabi and Josh then lose her dog Kiki, after Natasha leaves to see her injured Editor at the hospital. Meanwhile, after promising to take Sofia and Yolanda to see Beyoncé at a nightclub, Elliot's connection falls through at the last minute, with him having to fool Sofia and Yolanda, getting them drunk and thinking that they went to the club, when they stayed at Sofia's place the entire time.
55	4	"Young & Josh's Dad"	Andy Cadiff	Caryn Lucas	April 3, 2017	5002	0.43
When Josh receives an email from his long-lost father Matt Danon (Andy Buckley), requesting that the two meet up, Gabi becomes determined to reunite him with his dad. She cooks up a plan to impersonate a chauffeur and picks up Matt at an airport. Soon Gabi receives a call from Josh saying that he has already found his father and is presently with him. This shocks Gabi, as she now believes that she is driving around a strange psychopath. Later it is revealed Josh only said this so that Gabi will give up her efforts to reunite the two. In a confused jumble, Gabi runs over Matt twice at a gas station, hospitalizing him. Josh later meets with Matt at the hospital, apologizing for Gabi's shenanigans. His father explains to him that he could just never find the right words to write back to him all those past years. Meanwhile, Yolanda is concerned about her health, but much to Elliot's chagrin, Yolanda's doctor is much more concerned about his physical health than Yolanda's.
56	5	"Young & Softball"	Andy Cadiff	Mike Dow	April 10, 2017	5003	0.37
Josh participates in Elliot's "gay league" softball game. When Gabi takes Josh's father to the game to see him play, Matt believes Josh is gay. He is thrilled to finally be the accepting father that Josh has supposedly always needed. Josh keeps up the charade for the sake of bonding with his father. However, later Matt sees Josh being intimate with Gabi, discovering the truth. Meanwhile, Sofia, dressed as a nine-year-old, sells cookies in an attempt to win a cruise to Bore Bora for her and Yolanda. The two win the cruise but ultimately must relinquish the tickets due to the dishonesty they used to gain the most sales.
57	6	"Young & Couchy"	Andy Cadiff	Andrea Abbate	April 24, 2017	5005	0.33
Sofia receives a used, ugly couch from her boss, Logan. Gabi is disgusted by it, so she uses Josh's newly created app called "Crap for Cash" to sell the couch to anonymous bidders. She makes an $800 sale, but this means trouble when Sofia tells Gabi that Logan will come over to see the couch. In a crazy scheme to get the couch back, Gabi tracks it down to the apartment of Rabbi Shapiro's mother (Renée Taylor). The couch is brought back to Gabi and Sofia's apartment, but Sofia reveals that Logan giving her the couch was just a mean joke she plays on newly hired assistants. To make up for going against Sofia's wishes of keeping the couch, Gabi uses the money she earned to sign Sofia up for journalism night classes, due to her aspirations of becoming a writer.
58	7	"Young & Bridesmaids"	Andy Cadiff	Diana Snyder	May 1, 2017	5006	0.42
While having a "staycation" on their appointment balcony, Gabi and Sofia want a real vacation, but cannot afford it. They find out their "frenemy" Lisette (Nicole Byer) is getting married in Punta Cana so they try to become bridesmaids for Lisette's wedding. Lisette tells Gabi and Sofia that there is only room for one of them so she holds a contest to see who is better – Gabi or Sofia. Lisette chooses Sofia when she saves her wedding because she can speak Spanish. Josh gives Gabi money so that she can go too as she is upset she cannot go. Gabi and Sofia catch Lisette's fiancé cheating and tell her, only to find she is also cheating on him, but she still marries him. Sofia decides not to go to the wedding after she admits to Gabi she manipulated her into letting her go and the girls make up. Meanwhile, feeling unappreciated by Josh, Elliot pretends that he is fielding a job offer from a multimillionaire, but ends up going too far.
59	8	"Young & Vegas Baby"	Andy Cadiff	Joshua Corey & Brian Kratz	May 8, 2017	5008	0.42
Gabi is feeling down about her birthday, even after she discovers she and Ms. Wilson share their special day. When Gabi learns Ms. Wilson made a promise to meet a former boyfriend, Bernie (Carl Reiner) in Vegas, she decides a road trip to Sin City is the perfect way to get over her birthday blues since Gabi wanted to go on a trip with her mom as a 25th birthday present, but isn't able to because she's dead. Josh realises this when he thinks he has ruined Gabi's birthday with the surprise party, whilst almost admitting he loves her by saying "I can't lose the girl I...employed as my chef". To make Gabi feel better, Josh shows her New York, Paris, Venice – the places she was planning on going to with her mom – from the Las Vegas hotel, where Mrs Willson reunites with Bernie. Meanwhile, Yolanda and Elliot scheme to keep Gabi’s forgotten birthday gifts.
60	9	"Young & Hold"	Andy Cadiff	Caryn Lucas	May 15, 2017	5009	0.37
Josh decides he wants to have a real relationship putting his "friends with benefits" relationship with Gabi on hold and Gabi has her own new business where she delivers romantic things in a box. Meanwhile, Elliot has his wisdom teeth out which causes him to act slightly odd. However, everyone thinks he has gone crazy when he sees a squirrel in the apparent wall. When Gabi is spending time with Sofia and someone called Vinny (Ritesh Rajan), the ex-boyfriend to her customer, Marissa (Mia Serafino), she realises she is in love with Josh. Meanwhile, Josh is out on a date and realises he is in love with Gabi. In Josh's apartment, they try to tell each other how they feel and Gabi goes first. Just as Josh is about to say he loves Gabi back, the squirrel Eliot has been seeing makes Gabi and Josh jump. Josh hits his head and Gabi takes him to the hospital. Gabi is concerned for Josh and it turns out he has amnesia, leaving the episode on a cliffhanger.
61	10	"Young & Amnesia"	Andy Cadiff	David Holden	May 22, 2017	5010	0.55
While recovering at the hospital, Gabi is upset when Josh can't remember her but recognizes Elliot and Yolanda. The doctor tells Gabi his memory must come back gradually. Since Josh can't remember Gabi, she decides to recreate the day they met in hopes he will remember her. When visiting Gabi and Sofia's apartment, Josh starts to remember it, but thinks he loves Sofia and kisses her. Meanwhile, Gabi gets ready for attempting to be rehired as Josh's chef but loses her job when Josh prefers Michael Voltaggio. Yolanda brings Josh to Gabi's apartment as a ruse to have him help her with her computer and Josh realizes he's in love with the girl who lives in the apartment, but he ends up thinking it's Sofia instead of Gabi. Elliot decides to help Gabi by playing her and Josh's song from the pilot episode – "Closer" by Tegan and Sara, which makes Josh remember Gabi. Josh follows Gabi on the train, playing their song and he tells her he remembers everything. Josh kisses Gabi and tells her he loves her. She tells him again she loves him, they share two very passionate kisses, and finally get back together.
62	11	"Young & Downtown Gabi"	Andy Cadiff	Ryan Shankel	June 20, 2018	5011	0.33
Josh and Gabi are finally an official couple and are very in love. With Gabi staying with Josh at his home, Yolanda and Elliot both become paranoid that they are going to be fired (after Elliot binge-watches Downton Abbey) as Gabi becomes the "woman of the house"; so Gabi lets Josh stay at her house, but he is horrified that she is so messy. When Josh redecorates her apartment, Gabi is ungrateful and doesn't like it unlike Sofia who loves it. However, Gabi begins to love it after Sofia tells her being in a relationship is about compromise. Josh and Gabi talk and she apologises to him, saying she was worried that her stuff wasn't good enough for him, which made Gabi think she wasn't good enough for Josh. Josh tells Gabi he loves her for who she is and doesn't want to change her, because he fell in love with her for who she is.
63	12	"Young & Third Wheel"	Brent Carpenter	Dayo Adesokan	June 20, 2018	5012	0.31
Gabi and Josh decide to set Sofia up on a blind date with his dentist, Dick Donahue after she becomes a third wheel in their relationship & she is spending so much time with them.The date goes well until Gabi finds out Dick is still texting his ex Kayla, and she goes to track her down. It ends badly when she finds out Kayla still has feelings for Dick, who later tells him she still loves and proposes as he's out on a date with Sofia. Dick accepts which breaks Sofia's heart. Josh becomes hurt when he thinks Gabi cares more about Sofia than him. Sofia realizes it wouldn't have worked with Dick because of his first name, Harry. Gabi goes home & makes up with Josh, saying she still loves Sofia but doesn't miss her. Meanwhile, Alan introduces his mother to Elliot and even though Elliot isn't Jewish, Alan's mother still accepts him because he went through a lot for Alan.
64	13	"Young & Communication"	Andy Cadiff	Emily Ann Brandstetter	June 27, 2018	5013	0.32
Josh wants some time alone without Gabi so lies about joining a swim team - the Bay Seal Swimmers - from the help of Elliot. Gabi feels like Josh should communicate with her better now that they are a couple. When Gabi finds out he lied, she waxes Josh's whole body, but he still doesn't admit it. When Josh jumps in to the waters - which is shark infested - Gabi thinks he is dead and says that Josh is the love of her life. Josh comes out safe after hearing that Gabi knew all along that he was wanting time to himself sometimes. Josh tells Gabi the only reason he didn't tell her he wanted time to himself is because he didn't want her to think he didn't love her, because he does. Yolanda is eager to run into Stephen "tWitch" Boss, who has just moved into the building.
65	14	"Young & Handsy"	Andy Cadiff	David Holden	June 27, 2018	5014	0.29
Gabi panics about her relationship with Josh when they don't have sex for a couple of nights and Sofia believes it is only because he is tired (which is the issue). Gabi walks in on Josh one day and from what she sees believes he is masturbating; her anger results in her breaking Josh's laptop. When Josh finds out at the repair shop that Gabi broke it and she panicked, Josh explains to Gabi that just because they haven't had sex for two nights, it doesn't mean their relationship is over and the reason is because he was tired from working on his new app. Josh tells Gabi she has to stop worrying because he is "not going anywhere" and they say "I love you" to each other again, with their relationship staying just as strong.
66	15	"Young & Mexico, Part 1"	Andy Cadiff	Devon Kelly	July 11, 2018	TBA	0.31
Gabi takes Sofia away to Mexico for a last minute birthday present after she realises she has forgotten it. However, Sofia finds out about this and becomes angry with Gabi. Gabi makes it up to Sofia when she introduces her to Juan Carlo Rodriguez (Jose Moreno Brooks) - who serenades Sofia. Sofia and Juan Carlo fall in love and date, but are torn apart when Sofia must return to America with Gabi. Gabi decides to smuggle Juan Carlo to the US so he can be with Sofia and the episode ends with "to be continued...." Meanwhile, Josh has eye surgery and Yolanda and Elliot must look after him.
67	16	"Young & Mexico, Part 2"	Andy Cadiff	Caryn Lucas	July 11, 2018	TBA	0.31
Sofia finds out that Gabi tried to smuggle Juan Carlo out of Mexico, but they get caught by the Border control officer and are let off with a warning, while Juan Carlo is sent back to Mexico. Gabi asks Josh to help get him into the US, to which he first refuses. Sofia and Gabi find a lawyer, Nick Walker (Chris Smith), who specializes in this kind of thing. Sofia and Nick end up making out in her apartment. Meanwhile, Josh manages to get Juan Carlo to see Sofia at her apartment. Sofia realizes that she and Juan don't have the same relationship they had in Mexico and that she now has feelings for Nick. Meanwhile, Yolanda has sex dreams about Elliot after he is playing a song - which turns out to be a song her ex-husband Coleman used to play after they fought.
68	17	"Young & Motorcycle"	Andy Cadiff	Mike Dow	July 18, 2018	TBA	0.22
Gabi gets her uncle's old pink motorcycle. Josh is apprehensive about Gabi owning and riding a motorcycle. The bike gets stolen and Josh gets accused. After Gabi gets Elliot to confess, Josh overhears Elliot's confession and steals the bike before Gabi can retrieve it. Josh gets into a minor accident while driving the motorcycle away and ends up at a biker bar, and Gabi realizes that Josh was not being controlling, but rather he simply wanted to keep her safe. Sofia is going on her third date with Nick and wants to impress him with their first time being intimate, but the first night they eat really spicy food and Sofia is unable to perform due to gas and diarrhea. The second time Sofia is suffering from allergies and drinks to much cough syrup and ends up passing out. Sofia and Nick end up deciding that it just needs to be memorable and end up doing it in the bathroom of the biker bar.
69	18	"Young & Bullseye"	Andy Cadiff	Jenny Lee	July 18, 2018	TBA	0.21
Gabi, Josh, Sofia and Nick go on a double date. Josh is feeling insecure and ends up competing with Nick on everything. The date ends with Nick asking Sofia to move in with him to spite Josh. Josh and Gabi think that they will not follow-through and plan on offering their assistance with helping Sofia move to call their bluff. Sofia follows through and moves in with Nick, in turn Gabi suggests that Josh ask her to move in with him. Yolanda, Elliot and Alan go out to a bar and Eric (Brian J. White), a doctor, confuses Yolanda for someone he was meant to meet from an online dating app. Yolanda gets a second date and looks up the actual user and realizes that she's not as educated as the user he was actually meant to meet and Alan and Elliot help her by using a bluetooth to help her impress the "doctor" on their second date.
70	19	"Young & Magic"	Andy Cadiff	Rachel Sweet	July 25, 2018	TBA	0.30
Sofia's abuelita comes to town and Sofia plans on introducing Nick to her. Sofia's grandmother (Terri Hoyos) is quite judgmental about everything in Sofia's life and doesn't end up liking Nick. Josh confesses to Gabi that he's a magician, which Gabi initially states that she's supportive until she realizes it annoys her. Sofia and Gabi decide to express each other's displeasure with each other's counterpart - Gabi to Sofia's abuelita, and Sofia to Josh. Sofia doesn't tell Josh because he admits that he felt special and accepted that Gabi was supportive. Gabi actually tells Sofia's abuelita and she thinks she ended up killing her, but she was just pretending until Sofia stood up for herself and tells her how overbearing she is with her, in which her grandmother finally accepts Sofia as an adult. Gabi decides she is going to tell Josh how she feels about his magic. Yolanda was penpals with someone from prison until it becomes real that he is getting out and coming to see her.
71	20	"Young & Yacht'in"	Andy Cadiff	David Holden	July 25, 2018	TBA	0.29
Josh buys a yacht and brings Gabi, Sofia, Nick, Yolanda, Elliot & Alan on board, intending to propose to Gabi. Josh asks Nick to hide a box containing the ring, and while so Sofia overhears Nick's phone call, stating that his client cannot be connected with the missing drug shipments. Josh brings Chef Alex Guarnaschelli who offers a job in Seattle to mentor Gabi as a sous-chef. Sofia and Gabi investigate and find the ring - thinking that Nick is going to propose to Sofia, they celebrate. Sofia accidentally tosses the box overboard and dives into the sea, Gabi follows suit in an attempt to save her. Josh is about to propose to Gabi and she tells him about the job, which he tells her to accept. Sofia found the ring and she "accepts" Nick's proposal and attempts to tell her the truth. Josh makes the yacht turn back to San Francisco and disappears as soon as it docks. Nick tells Sofia what actually happened. Gabi rushes to find Josh to tell him that she won't take the job, but Josh insists that she follows her dream. Gabi, in turn, proposes to Josh and asks him to move with her to Seattle.

== Ratings ==
=== Season 1 (2014) ===
Viewership and ratings per episode of List of Young & Hungry episodes
No.	Title	Air date	Rating (18–49)	Viewers (millions)
1	"Pilot"	June 25, 2014	0.5	1.09
2	"Young & Ringless"	July 2, 2014	0.3	0.77
3	"Young & Lesbian"	July 9, 2014	0.4	0.91
4	"Young & Pregnant"	July 16, 2014	0.4	0.90
5	"Young & Younger"	July 23, 2014	0.4	0.76
6	"Young & Punchy"	July 30, 2014	0.4	0.93
7	"Young & Secret"	August 6, 2014	0.4	0.85
8	"Young & Car-less"	August 13, 2014	0.3	0.89
9	"Young & Getting Played"	August 20, 2014	0.4	0.85
10	"Young & Thirty (...and Getting Married!)"	August 27, 2014	0.5	1.02

=== Season 2 (2015) ===
Viewership and ratings per episode of List of Young & Hungry episodes
No.	Title	Air date	Rating (18–49)	Viewers (millions)
1	"Young & Too Late"	March 25, 2015	0.4	0.77
2	"Young & Cookin’"	April 1, 2015	0.3	0.73
3	"Young & Munchies"	April 8, 2015	0.4	0.76
4	"Young & Old"	April 15, 2015	0.3	0.68
5	"Young & First Time"	April 22, 2015	0.4	0.77
6	"Young & Moving"	April 29, 2015	0.3	0.60
7	"Young & Ferris Wheel"	May 6, 2015	0.3	0.57
8	"Young & Sandwich"	May 13, 2015	0.3	0.59
9	"Young & Pretty Woman"	May 20, 2015	0.4	0.97
10	"Young & Part Two"	May 27, 2015	0.5	0.93
11	"Young & How Gabi Got Her Job Back"	August 19, 2015	0.4	0.85
12	"Young & Back to Normal"	August 26, 2015	0.3	0.60
13	"Young & Unemployed"	September 2, 2015	0.4	0.71
14	"Young & Oh Brother"	September 9, 2015	0.4	0.76
15	"Young & Earthquake"	September 16, 2015	0.3	0.60
16	"Young & How Sofia Got Her Groove Back"	September 23, 2015	0.3	0.81
17	"Young & Trashy"	September 30, 2015	0.3	0.68
18	"Young & Doppleganger"	September 30, 2015	0.4	0.78
19	"Young & Younger Brother, Part 1"	October 14, 2015	0.3	0.63
20	"Young & Younger Brother, Part 2"	October 14, 2015	0.3	0.55
21	"Young & Christmas"	November 24, 2015	0.3	0.55

=== Season 3 (2016) ===
Viewership and ratings per episode of List of Young & Hungry episodes
No.	Title	Air date	Rating (18–49)	Viewers (millions)
1	"Young & The Next Day"	February 3, 2016	0.3	0.65
2	"Young & Coachella"	February 10, 2016	0.3	0.53
3	"Young & Parents"	February 17, 2016	0.3	0.57
4	"Young & First Date"	February 24, 2016	0.3	0.62
5	"Young & Therapy"	March 2, 2016	0.2	0.44
6	"Young & Rachael Ray"	March 9, 2016	0.3	0.53
7	"Young & Rob’d"	March 16, 2016	0.3	0.52
8	"Young & Clippy"	March 23, 2016	0.2	0.45
9	"Young & Lottery"	March 30, 2016	0.2	0.49
10	"Young & No More Therapy"	April 6, 2016	0.3	0.54

=== Season 4 (2016) ===
Viewership and ratings per episode of List of Young & Hungry episodes
No.	Title	Air date	Rating (18–49)	Viewers (millions)
1	"Young & Hawaii"	June 1, 2016	0.3	0.53
2	"Young & Hurricane"	June 8, 2016	0.3	0.56
3	"Young & Fried"	June 15, 2016	0.3	0.65
4	"Young & Piggy"	June 22, 2016	0.3	0.63
5	"Young & Fostered"	June 29, 2016	0.3	0.52
6	"Young & Assistant"	July 6, 2016	0.3	0.56
7	"Young & Bowling"	July 13, 2016	0.3	0.57
8	"Young & Sofia"	July 20, 2016	0.2	0.44
9	"Young & Matched"	July 27, 2016	0.3	0.51
10	"Young & Screwed"	August 3, 2016	0.3	0.53

=== Season 5 (2017–18) ===
Viewership and ratings per episode of List of Young & Hungry episodes
No.	Title	Air date	Rating (18–49)	Viewers (millions)
1	"Young & Punch Card"	March 13, 2017	0.2	0.49
2	"Young & Valentine’s Day"	March 20, 2017	0.2	0.36
3	"Young & Kiki"	March 27, 2017	0.2	0.43
4	"Young & Josh’s Dad"	April 3, 2017	0.2	0.43
5	"Young & Softball"	April 10, 2017	0.2	0.37
6	"Young & Couchy"	April 17, 2017	0.1	0.33
7	"Young & Bridesmaids"	May 1, 2017	0.2	0.42
8	"Young & Vegas Baby"	May 8, 2017	0.2	0.42
9	"Young & Hold"	May 15, 2017	0.2	0.37
10	"Young & Amnesia"	May 22, 2017	0.3	0.55
11	"Young & Downtown Gabi"	June 20, 2018	0.2	0.33
12	"Young & Third Wheel"	June 20, 2018	0.2	0.31
13	"Young & Communication"	June 27, 2018	0.2	0.32
14	"Young & Handsy"	June 27, 2018	0.2	0.29
15	"Young & Mexico, Part 1"	July 11, 2018	0.2	0.31
16	"Young & Mexico, Part 2"	July 11, 2018	0.1	0.31
17	"Young & Motorcylce"	July 18, 2018	0.1	0.22
18	"Young & Bullseye"	July 18, 2018	0.1	0.21
19	"Young & Magic"	July 25, 2018	0.1	0.30
20	"Young & Yacht’in"	July 25, 2018	0.1	0.29

Young & Hungry : U.S. viewers per episode (thousands)

Season	Episode number																					Average
Season	1	2	3	4	5	6	7	8	9	10	11	12	13	14	15	16	17	18	19	20	21	Average
1	1090	770	910	900	760	930	850	890	850	1020	–											900
2	770	730	760	680	770	600	570	590	970	930	850	600	710	760	600	810	680	780	630	550	550	710
3	650	530	570	620	440	530	520	450	490	540	–											530
4	530	560	650	630	520	560	570	440	510	530	–											550
5	490	360	430	430	370	330	420	420	370	550	330	310	320	290	310	310	220	210	300	290	–	350

Audience measurement performed by Nielsen Media Research

== Webisodes ==
=== Young & Foodies (2014) ===
No.	Title	Original release date	Length (minutes)
1	"Get to Know Gabi"	June 24, 2014	2:52
2	"Food Bomb"	June 26, 2014	3:15
3	"Gabi's No Fail Grilled Cheese"	July 3, 2014	3:06
4	"Hot & Hungry"	July 9, 2014	3:29
5	"Melted Chocolate Madness"	July 19, 2014	2:33
6	"Gabi's Pizza Throw Down"	July 23, 2014	2:57
7	"Easy Breezy Brunch with Aimee Carrero"	July 31, 2014	3:09
8	"$50 Pantry with Jonathan Sadowski"	August 6, 2014	3:13
9	"Gabi's Grill"	August 13, 2014	3:00
10	"Gabi's Game Show"	August 20, 2014	3:31
