= Demi Mills =

American actress

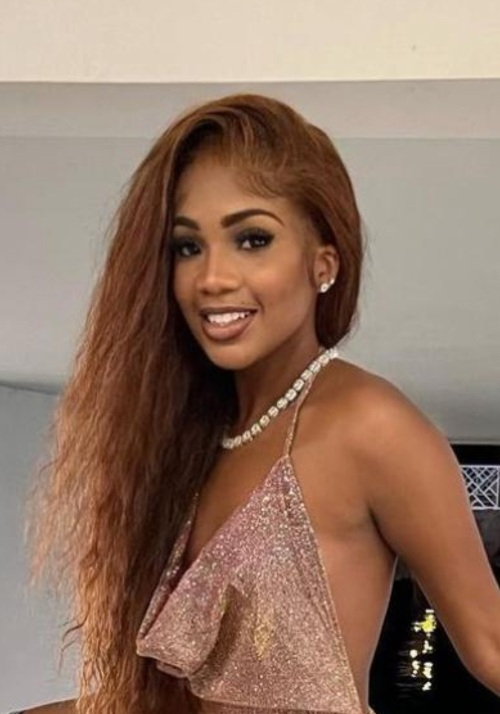
- Born: 9 December 2004 (age 21); Long Island, New York
- Occupation: Actor
- Website: www.demimills.com

Demi Mills (born December 9, 2004) is an American actor. She is known for her recurring co-star role in ABC's Freeform Young and Hungry as young "Keisha" and NBC New Amsterdam (TV Series 2018–2023) as Harmony.

== Life and career ==
Born in Long Island Newyork, Demi had an early start in the TV film entertainment industry when she entered and won "Female child model of the year" and "Actress runner-up" in the International Modeling and Talent Association "IMTA" at the age of 6.

Demi is known for her recurring co-star role in ABC's Freeform Young and Hungry as young "Keisha" and NBC New Amsterdam (TV Series 2018–2023) as Harmony. She has taken on several other roles, as lead actor, guest star and in recurring capacities for ABC and NBC networks. She booked several ABC Network in a pilot such as Delores and Jermaine as Whoopi Goldberg's Granddaughter Yashika and ABC's pilot The Finest Recurring role of Isabelle. In addition, Demi has booked several Guest Star roles for NBC's Believe as young Bridgette, and East New York role of Riley and Hulu's Difficult People.

Demi has starred in several short films, including the lead role of Sasha in ABC's Fear of Heights and Dominik the Daring and Bronco the Drave where she played the lead and won best lead actress at the First Run Film Festival 2016. Demi has also booked several national network commercials with Citibank, Chase, Jif (peanut butter), and others.

== Awards ==
- 2011 – "Female child model of the year" and "Actress runner-up" in the International Modeling and Talent Association "IMTA"
- 2016 – Best lead actress at the First Run Film Festival

== Filmography ==
Year	Title	Role
2014	Stalked: Someone's Watching (TV Series)	Angel's Daughter
2014	Believe (TV Series)	Briditte McCain
2014	Seasons of Love (TV Movie)	Gladys Knight Grand Daughter
2015	Hall Stars (TV Series)	Student 1
2015	Difficult People (TV Series)	Dancer 1
2015	Delores & Jermaine (TV Movie)	Yashika
2016	Young & Hungry (TV Series)	Keisha
2016	Sincere's Heart (TV Movie)	Ashley Heart
2016	Fear of Heights (TV Movie)	Sasha
2016	Bronco the Brave (Short Film)	Dominik
2018	The Finest (TV Movie)	Isabella
2019	New Amsterdam (2018) (TV Series)	Harmony
2022	East New York (TV Series)	Rylee

== See also ==
- Young & Hungry
- List of Young & Hungry episodes
