= Tyler Ritter =

American actor (born 1985)

- Born: Tyler David Thomas Ritter; January 31, 1985 (age 41); Los Angeles, California, U.S.
- Occupation: Actor
- Years active: 2007–present
- Spouse: Lelia Parma (m. 2007)
- Children: 2
- Parents: John Ritter (father); Nancy Morgan (mother)
- Relatives: Tex Ritter (grandfather); Dorothy Fay (grandmother); Jason Ritter (brother); Amy Yasbeck (stepmother); Melanie Lynskey (sister-in-law)

Tyler David Thomas Ritter (born January 31, 1985) is an American actor who starred as Ronny McCarthy on The McCarthys.

== Early life ==
Ritter is the son of actor John Ritter and brother of actor Jason Ritter. His grandfather was country singer Tex Ritter, who died a decade before Tyler was born. He grew up in Los Angeles, and despite having acted in high school plays and student films, following his father's unexpected death in 2003, he decided not to pursue acting professionally. After graduating from the University of Pennsylvania in 2007, he worked for three years as a teacher in Argentina. At the age of 25, he made the decision to return to Los Angeles and pursue an acting career.

== Career ==
After featuring in guest roles on Modern Family and Grey's Anatomy, Ritter landed his first starring role on the 2014 sitcom The McCarthys, playing Ronny McCarthy, the openly gay son in a family of six. Ritter has discussed in interviews the bittersweet nature of his casting, with regard to the death of his father.

In 2015, Ritter was cast in NCIS as Abby Sciuto's brother Luca, appearing in both an episode of NCIS and NCIS: New Orleans.

2016 saw Ritter cast in two recurring roles. He was cast in the role of Adam on the fourth season of Freeform's comedy Young and Hungry, and was cast in the role of Detective Billy Malone on the fifth season of the CW series Arrow.

In 2020, he had a guest appearance in an Amazon Original series, Homecoming, directed by Kyle Patrick Alvarez.

== Personal life ==
Ritter married Argentine film director Lelia Parma in 2007. In 2017, they welcomed their first child, a son named Benjamin Parma Ritter. In 2020, they welcomed their second child, a daughter named Magnolia Parma Ritter.

== Filmography ==
=== Film ===
Year	Title	Role	Notes
2011	Weekends at Bellevue		Short Film
2012	Defeat the Label		Short Film
2013	Life in Text	Benjamin	Short Film
2013	Slice	Morgan	Short Film
2014	Girlfriend Lies	Gonz	Short Film
2014	Go Fish	Gabe	Short Film
2018	Stillwater	Dawson	Film
2022	Who Killed Cooper Dunn?	Dawson	Film

=== Television ===
Year	Title	Role	Notes
2008	Good Dick	Young Handsome Man	Television film
2013	Modern Family	Randall	Episode: "Larry's Wife"
2014	Grey's Anatomy	Mr. Zarr	Episode: "Everything I Try to Do, Nothing Seems to Turn Out Right"
2014	Work Mom	Marc Rhodes	Television film
2014	An Evergreen Christmas	Adam	Television film
2014–2015	The McCarthys	Ronny McCarthy	Main Role
2015	Agents of S.H.I.E.L.D.	Thomas Ward	Episode: "Closure"
2015	Hot in Cleveland	Bart	Episode: "Vegas Baby/I Hate Goodbyes"
2016	NCIS	Luca Sciuto	Episode: "Sister City (Part I)"
2016	NCIS: New Orleans	Luca Sciuto	Episode: "Sister City (Part II)"
2016	Loosely Exactly Nicole	Danny	Episode: "Danny Boom"
2016	Young & Hungry	Adam Foley	Episodes: "Young & Hawaii", "Young & Hurricane"
2016	Arrow	Detective Billy Malone	Recurring Role; Season 5
2017	Chicago P.D.	Rex Goldwin	Episode: "Last Minute Resistance"
2018	The Good Doctor	George Reynolds	Episode: "Empathy"
2019	What Just Happened??! with Fred Savage	Man with no Voice	Episode: "Assistant"
2019	Merry Happy Whatever	Alan	3 episodes
2020	Homecoming (TV series)	Lane	4 episodes (Season 2)
2023	Painkiller	John Brownlee	4 episodes
2024	Chicago Med	Derek Walker	Season 9 Episode 13 "I Think I Know You, But Do I Really?"
2026	‘’911 : Nashville’’	Carl	Season 1 Episode 12
