= Cadeaux =

Indie rock project

Cadeaux is a collaborative indie rock project from Los Angeles, California. Members include Briana Lane of Winslow and Darian Zahedi of CRX.

Their first single Bad was released on September 17, 2020. The song was mixed by production veteran Shane Stoneback (Vampire Weekend, Cults, Rostam). On December 30, 2020, the track became KCRW's Top Tune of the Day. Cadeaux released its next single Either Way on February 24, 2022. In collaboration with Poolside and Ornament and Crime, their single On and On was released on July 21, 2023. Cadeaux's next single with Ornament and Crime, Sparks in the Air, debuted in November, 2023.

The video for "Bad" was directed by film and TV director Brea Grant.

== Discography ==
Singles
Title	Year	Album
"Bad"	2020	Cadeaux

== Band members ==
- Briana Lane
- Darian Zahedi
