= Protecting Jared =

Upcoming American action comedy film

- Directed by: Ruben Fleischer
- Written by: Rob Klein; John Solomon
- Produced by: Jason Momoa; Andy Samberg; Ali Bell; Brian Andrew Mendoza; Thomas Sibbett
- Starring: Jason Momoa; Andy Samberg; Aimee Carrero; Jai Courtney
- Cinematography: Kramer Morgenthau
- Production companies: On The Roam; Party Over Here
- Distributed by: Netflix
- Country: United States
- Language: English

Protecting Jared is an upcoming American action comedy film directed by Ruben Fleischer and written by Rob Klein and John Solomon. The film stars Jason Momoa, Andy Samberg, Aimee Carrero, and Jai Courtney. It is scheduled to be released by Netflix.

== Premise ==
An underachieving former military cadet takes a security job protecting a tech billionaire he dislikes. After armed commandos attempt to kidnap the billionaire, the pair are forced to escape through the Hawaiian wilderness.

== Cast ==
- Jason Momoa as William Ikaika
- Andy Samberg as Jared Bachman
- Aimee Carrero
- Jai Courtney

== Production ==
In June 2025, it was announced that Netflix had acquired an untitled action comedy film written by Rob Klein and John Solomon, with Jason Momoa and Andy Samberg set to star and produce. In March 2026, the project's title was revealed as Protecting Jared, with Ruben Fleischer announced as the director, and Aimee Carrero and Jai Courtney joining the cast of the film.

Principal photography took place in Hawaii from February to May 2026.

== Release ==
The film is scheduled to be released on Netflix.
