= Aimee Carrero =

American actress

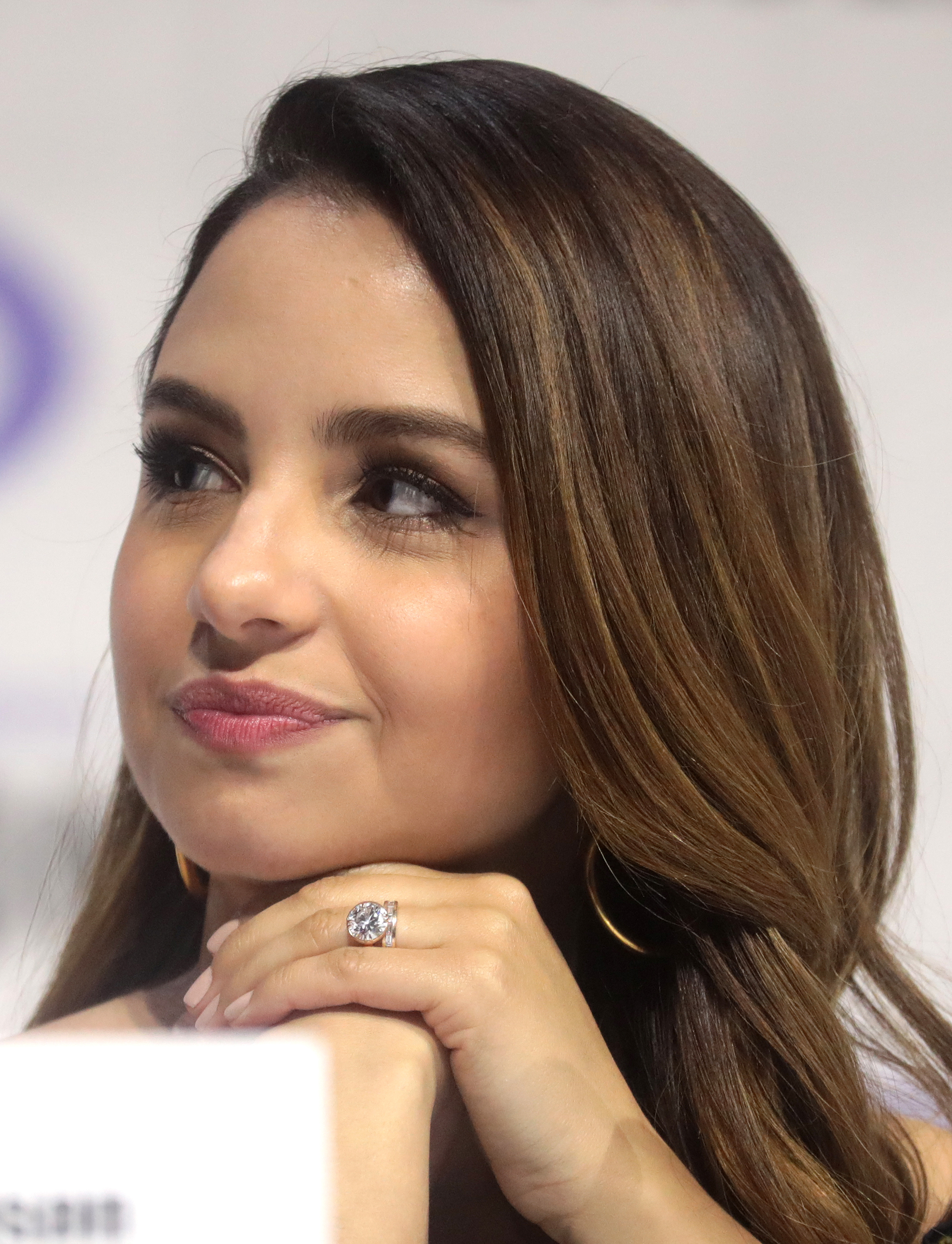
- Carrero in 2019
- Born: July 15, 1988 (age 38); Santo Domingo, Dominican Republic
- Other name: Aimee Carrero Rock
- Education: Florida International University (BA)
- Occupation: Actress
- Years active: 2007–present
- Spouse: Tim Rock (m. 2016)
- Children: 1

Aimee Carrero (born July 15, 1988) is an American actress. She is known for her leading roles in the sitcom Young & Hungry (2014–2018), and the thriller series The Consultant (2023) with recurring roles on shows such as the ABC family drama Lincoln Heights (2009), and the FX spy series The Americans (2014), the Netflix miniseries Maid (2021), and the Apple TV+ dramedy series Your Friends & Neighbors (2025).

Carrero has acted in films taking supporting roles in the horror film Devil's Due (2014), the drama Wander Darkly (2020), the thriller The Menu (2022), and the romantic comedy Upgraded (2023). She is also known for voicing Princess Elena on Disney Channel's Elena of Avalor (2016–2020) and Adora/She-Ra in the Netflix series She-Ra and the Princesses of Power (2018–2020).

== Early life and education ==
Carrero was born in Santo Domingo, Dominican Republic to a Dominican mother and a Puerto Rican father and grew up in Miami, Florida. She is an alumna of Florida International University graduating in 2008 with a degree in international relations.

== Career ==
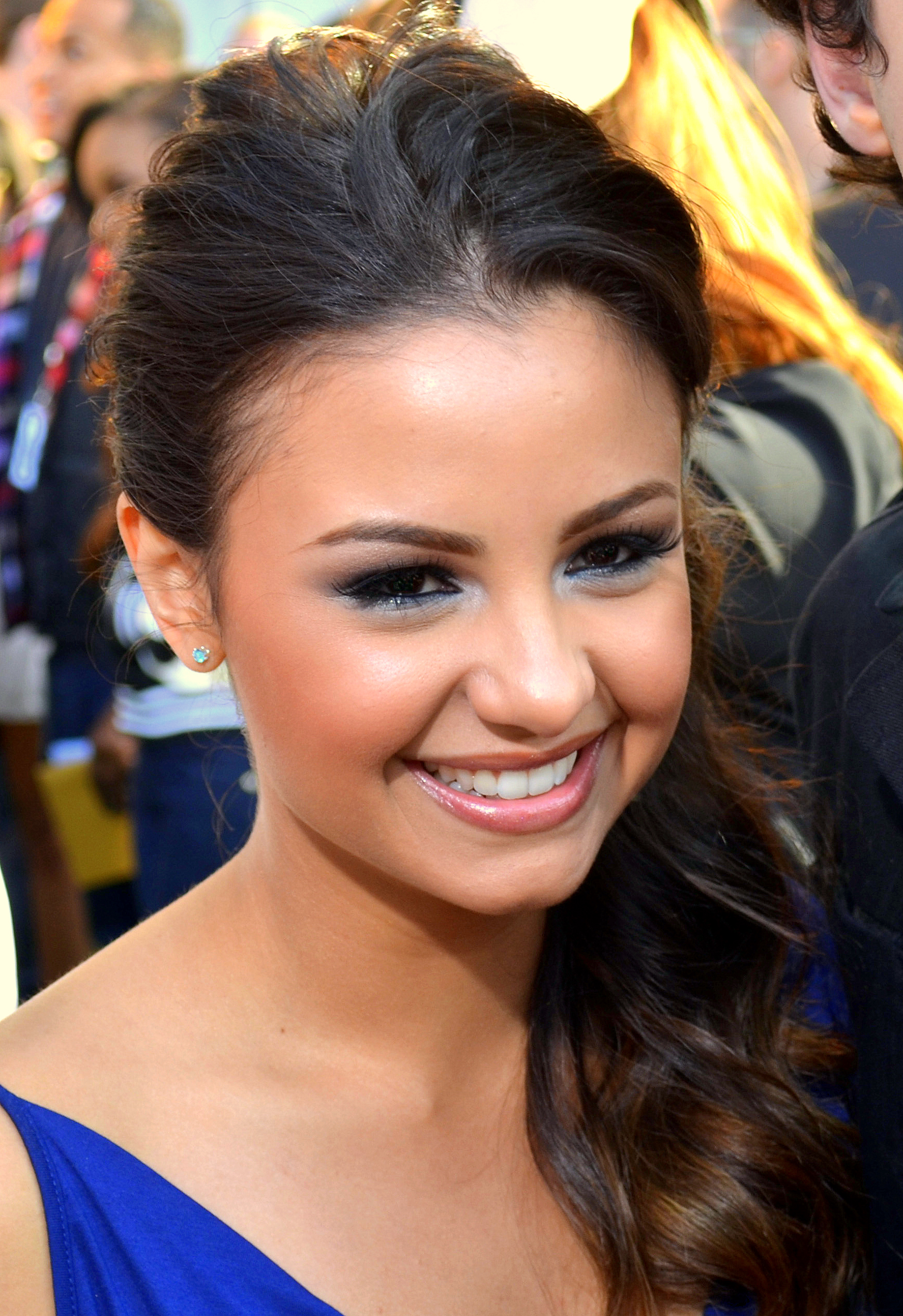
Carrero in 2012

In 2009, she appeared in the feature film Alvin and the Chipmunks: The Squeakquel. Carrero's television credits include The Mentalist, Lincoln Heights, Men of a Certain Age, The Middle, Greek, Zeke and Luther and Baby Daddy. In 2011, she was cast as Angie in the Cartoon Network live-action film Level Up. She reprised her role in the subsequent television series of the same name. The series ended in 2013 after two seasons.

In 2012, Carrero played in the Lifetime television film Blue Lagoon: The Awakening. That same year, she made her Off-Broadway debut in Atlantic Theater Company's world premiere play, What Rhymes with America in December 2012. Marilyn Stasio of Variety praised her performance describing her full of "snappy wit and crackling intelligence". In 2014, she co-starred in the horror film Devil's Due. Carrero also had a recurring role in the second season of the FX series The Americans as Lucia, a Sandinista freedom fighter and spy. She was also cast in the ABC Family sitcom Young & Hungry, starring Emily Osment.

In January 2015, it was announced that Carrero will be providing the voice of Elena, Disney's first Latina fairy tale princess for the Disney Channel series Elena of Avalor. The series is a spin-off of the Disney Junior series Sofia the First, with reports that Carrero would sing in every episode. The series premiered on July 22, 2016 on the Disney Channel. Prior to the series release, Carrero would describe Elena as "the first princess actively ruling her kingdom" who is her "own hero" without a Prince Charming, and is learning that leadership is "about sacrifice and not...[a] sort of totalitarian control over the people that she rules". She asserted that Elena's role as princess "sort of resembles more of a president than...[a] princess".

In April 2016, it was announced that Carrero and her character Sofia would be co-starring with Ashley Tisdale in a potential spinoff series of Young & Hungry, titled Young & Sofia. However, the project did not move past the backdoor pilot phase. In 2017 she returned to the Off-Broadway stage acting in John Patrick Shanley's play The Portuguese Kid opposite Jason Alexander and Sherie Rene Scott at the Manhattan Theater Club.

In 2018, Carrero was cast as the voice of main character Adora in the Netflix animated series reboot She-Ra and the Princesses of Power. From June to August 2021, Carrero starred in the actual play limited series Exandria Unlimited, a spinoff of the web series Critical Role. In March 2022, she reprised her role in a two part special Exandria Unlimited: Kymal.

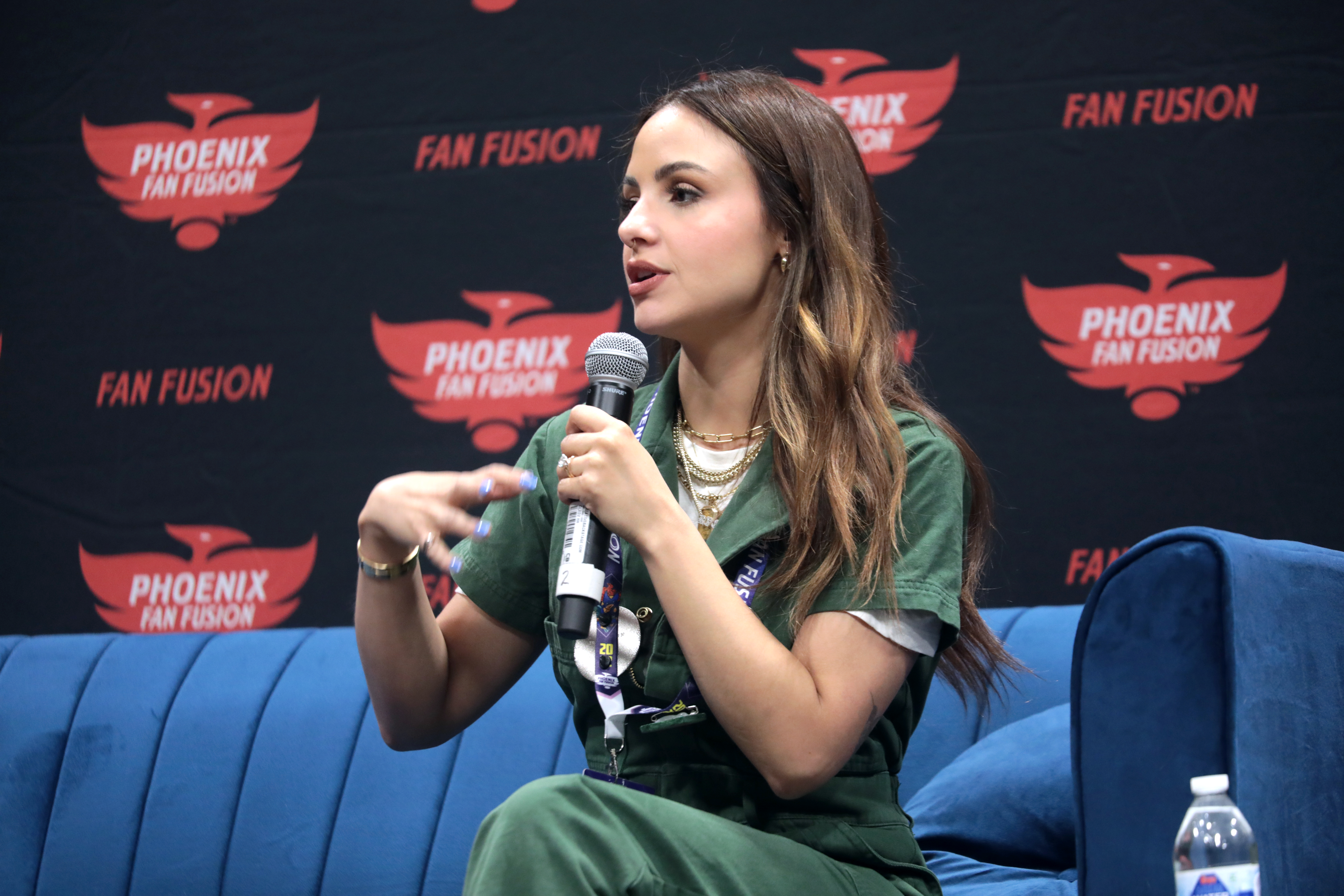
Carrero speaking with attendees at the 2023 Phoenix Fan Fusion at the Phoenix Convention Center in Phoenix, Arizona.

Carrero landed a recurring role as Danielle in the limited series Maid starring Margaret Qualley. The series is inspired by Stephanie Land's memoir Maid: Hard Work, Low Pay, and a Mother's Will to Survive, that premiered on Netflix on October 1, 2021. Her character is a survivor of domestic abuse who becomes friends with Alex, Margaret Qualley's character, at the women's shelter. Fans and critics of the show praised Danielle as a "fiercely determined character" and "another young mom at the domestic violence shelter who quite literally gets Alex back on her feet" but noted that her story was never completed and the audience is left wondering what happened to her. For her role in Maid, she was nominated for Best Supporting Actress – Drama (Television) at Imagen Awards in 2022.

In 2022, she returned to the stage, in a Los Angeles revival of Edward Albee's play Who's Afraid of Virginia Woolf? starring Zachary Quinto and Calista Flockhart at the Geffen Playhouse. Carrero played Honey, part of a naive young couple opposite Graham Phillips. Charles McNulty of The Los Angeles Times wrote that, "Carrero brings a spry comic waywardness to her portrayal of the brandy-swigging spouse, who's already growing a bit restless in the shadow of her rising academic star husband." For her performance, she was nominated for the Los Angeles Drama Critics Circle Award for Best Featured Performance.

She appeared in supporting roles in Spirited and Mark Mylod's The Menu in 2022. On October 16, 2022, Carrero was given the Breakout Performance Award at the Newport Beach Film Festival. In February 2024, she portrayed Vivian, Camila Mendes' character's sister in the Amazon Prime Video romantic comedy film Upgraded (2024). In April 2024, Carrero was added to the main cast of Apple TV+'s television drama series Your Friends and Neighbors. In a series regular role, she joins an ensemble cast that also includes Olivia Munn, Amanda Peet and Jon Hamm. She has one of the main roles as “paramedic student ride along” who ends up being a resident physician named Jessica in the action comedy film Code 3 (2024), set to premiere on September 12, 2024, at the Toronto International Film Festival. Co-starring opposite Rainn Wilson and Lil Rel Howery, the film follows a 24-hour shift of busy and overworked paramedics.

In April 2026, it was announced that Elena Castillo Flores would be guest-starring in Sofia The First: Royal Magic, a sequel to Sofia the First, providing "wisdom and guidance" to Sofia. In a social media posting, series creator Craig Gerber confirmed that Carrero would be reprising the role, noted that Carrero was working on other films and TV shows, and stated that Carrero would sing "a few tunes" in the series.

== Personal life ==
In November 2015, she became engaged to actor Tim Rock. They were married on August 20, 2016. Their first child, a daughter, was born on June 5, 2025.

== Acting credits ==
=== Film ===
Year	Title	Role	Notes
2007	The Essential Man	Eva Stroheim	Short film
2007	Category 4	Alexandra	Short film
2009	Alvin and the Chipmunks: The Squeakquel	Emily	
2010	Never Winter	Sam	Short film
2014	Devil's Due	Emily	
2014	Obituaries	Marie Sinclair	Short film
2015	The Last Witch Hunter	Miranda	
2017	Yoshua	Maelle	Short film
2018	The Portuguese Kid	Patti Dragonetti	
2018	Dylan	Maritza	Short film
2020	Wander Darkly	Shea	
2020	Holidate	Carly	
2022	Mack & Rita	Sunita	
2022	The Menu	Felicity	
2022	Spirited	Nora	
2024	Upgraded	Vivian	Amazon Prime Video original film
2025	Code 3	Jessica	
TBA	One Attempt Remaining †	TBA	Filming
TBA	Protecting Jared †	TBA	Filming

=== Television ===
Year	Title	Role	Notes
2009	Hannah Montana	Mia	Episode: "For (Give) a Little Bit"
2009	Lincoln Heights	Sylvia Torres	4 episodes
2009	The Mentalist	Cassie	Episode: "Blood Brothers"
2010	Greek	Sunny	Episode: "Your Friends and Neighbors"
2010	The Middle	Teenage Sales Clerk	Episode: "The Neighbor"
2011–2013	Level Up	Angie	Main role
2012	Blue Lagoon: The Awakening	Jude	Television film
2014	Baby Daddy	Sydney	Episode: "Romancing the Phone"
2014	The Americans	Lucia	4 episodes
2014–2018	Young & Hungry	Sofia Rodriguez	Main role
2015–2020	Blindspot	Ana Montes	3 episodes
2016	MacGyver	Cindy	Episode: "The Corkscrew"
2016	Elena and the Secret of Avalor	Princess Elena	Television film; voice role
2016–2020	Elena of Avalor	Princess Elena	Lead voice role
2017	American Horror Story: Cult	Picnic Girl	Episode: "Election Night"
2018–2020	She-Ra and the Princesses of Power	Adora / She-Ra	Lead voice role
2019	The Village	Sofia Lopez	Recurring role, 5 episodes
2021	Maid	Danielle	Recurring role
2022	Family Guy	Hispanic Girl	Voice role, Episode: "First Blood"
2022	The Offer	Rosie Molina	Miniseries, Episode: Mr. Producer
2022–2025	Firebuds	Marina Ramirez	Recurring voice role, 5 episodes
2023	The Consultant	Patti	Main role
2023	The Legend of Vox Machina	Ashari Girl	Voice role, Episode: "Pass Through Fire"
2025	Your Friends & Neighbors	Elena	Main role
2025	The Mighty Nein	Zuala, Sentry	Voice role, Episode: "The Zadash Job"
2026	Sofia the First: Royal Magic	Princess Elena	Guest voice role

=== Theater ===
Year	Title	Role	Playwright	Venue	Ref.
2012	What Rhymes with America	Marlene	Melissa James Gibson	Atlantic Theater Company, Off-Broadway	
2017	The Portuguese Kid	Patty	John Patrick Shanley	Manhattan Theatre Club, Off-Broadway	
2022	Who's Afraid of Virginia Woolf?	Honey	Edward Albee	The Geffen Playhouse, Los Angeles	

=== Web ===
Year	Title	Role	Notes
2012	Silverwood	Emily	Episode: "Silverwood Inn"
2014	Young & Hungry	Herself	4 episodes
2021	Exandria Unlimited	Opal	Main role; 8 episodes
2022	Exandria Unlimited: Kymal	Opal	Main role; 2 episodes
2022	Critical Role (one-shots)	Lilith Ferrera (Jinxx)	Episode: "Generation Nord"
2023–2025	Critical Role (campaign three)	Deni$e Bembachula, Opal	Guest role; 8 episodes
2024	Candela Obscura: The Circle of the Crimson Mirror	Grimoria	Main role; 3 episodes
2025	Dirty Laundry	Herself	Episode: "Who Joined an Ex on Their Honeymoon?"

=== Video Games ===
Year	Title	Role	Ref.
2025	Date Everything!	Penelope	

=== Music videos ===
Year	Title	Artist	Role	Notes
2018	"SOS"	Cher	Herself	Music video for Cher's ABBA tribute album Dancing Queen
2023	"Blue Dress"	Aly & AJ	Sad Waitress	Music videos for Aly & AJ's album With Love From
2023	"After Hours"	Aly & AJ	Disgruntled Bartender	Music videos for Aly & AJ's album With Love From

== Awards and nominations ==
Year	Association	Category	Project	Result	Ref.
2013	Animayo Animation Festival	Audience Award (shared with the cast)	Vortexx: English Version	Nominated	
2013	Animayo Animation Festival	Best Visual Effects (shared with the cast)	Vortexx: English Version	Nominated	
2017	Imagen Awards	Best Actress – Television	Elena of Avalor	Nominated	
2018	Behind the Voice Actors Awards	Best Female Lead Vocal Performance in a Television Series	Elena of Avalor	Won	
2018	Chicago Horror Film Festival	Best Actress	Dylan	Nominated	
2018	Cinema at the Edge Independent Film Festival	Best Actress	Dylan	Won	
2018	Idyllwild International Festival of Cinema	Best Actress – Featurette	Dylan	Nominated	
2022	Imagen Awards	Best Supporting Actress – Drama (Television)	Maid	Nominated	
2022	Newport Beach Film Festival	Breakout Performance Award		Won	
2022	Los Angeles Drama Critics Circle Award	Best Featured Performance	Who's Afraid of Virginia Woolf?	Nominated	
