= The Portuguese Kid =

Play written by John Patrick Stanley

The Portuguese Kid is a play written by John Patrick Shanley. The play starred Jason Alexander and Sherie Rene Scott. The play opened off-Broadway at the Manhattan Theatre Club on October 24, 2017.

== Synopsis ==
In Providence, Rhode Island, habitually widowed Atalanta pays a visit to her second-rate lawyer Barry Dragonetti. Intending to settle her latest husband's affairs, this larger-than-life Greek tightwad quickly becomes a nightmare for her cheesy, self-aggrandizing attorney. Add Barry's impossible Croatian mother, a dash of current politics and a couple of opportunistic young lovers, and you have in hand a recipe for comic combustion.

== Original cast ==
- Jason Alexander as Barry Dragonetti
- Sherie Rene Scott as Atalanta Lagana
- Mary Testa as Mrs. Dragonetti
- Aimee Carrero as Patti Dragonetti
- Pico Alexander as Freddie Imbrossi

== Reception ==
The play received mostly negative reviews. Writing for The New York Times, Jesse Green said "Perhaps it would have been more convincing if Mr. Shanley hadn’t hired himself to direct. A strong countervailing force might have encouraged him to look beyond the sitcom laugh track — and might have informed him that his spice rack of gender and ethnic stereotypes (women are paradoxes; Puerto Ricans are firecrackers) has gone stale. The designers, all tops in their fields in other productions, might have found a less garish palette, too; “The Portuguese Kid” looks like a picture book designed for children with cataracts." While Isabella Biedenharn at Entertainment Weekly says "The Portuguese Kid makes for a wildly entertaining couple of hours of whip-smart banter — as long as you don’t expect much substance beyond that."
