= Telenovela (TV series) =

American sitcom

- Also known as: Hot & Bothered
- Genre: Sitcom
- Created by: Chrissy Pietrosh; Jessica Goldstein; Robert Harling
- Starring: Eva Longoria; Jencarlos Canela; Diana Maria Riva; Amaury Nolasco; Jose Moreno Brooks; Jadyn Douglas; Alex Meneses; Izzy Diaz
- Composer: Danny Lux
- Country of origin: United States
- Original languages: English; Spanish
- No. of seasons: 1
- No. of episodes: 11

Production
- Executive producers: Eva Longoria; Chrissy Pietrosh; Jessica Goldstein; Josh Bycel; Jonathan Fener; Ben Spector
- Producers: Patrick Ward; Dylan K. Massin
- Camera setup: Single camera
- Running time: 22 minutes
- Production companies: Tall and Short Productions; UnbeliEVAble Entertainment; Universal Television

Original release
- Network: NBC
- Release: December 7, 2015 – February 22, 2016

Telenovela is an American single-camera sitcom television series starring Eva Longoria and Jencarlos Canela. The series is a behind-the-scenes look at a fictional telenovela (Latin American soap opera) that is shot in Miami, Florida, and follows the daily life of the show's star, who does not speak Spanish. The series premiered on December 7, 2015 on NBC, and concluded on February 22, 2016.

On May 13, 2016, NBC canceled the series after one season.

== Cast and characters ==
=== Main ===
- Eva Longoria as Ana Sofia Calderon, the neurotic star of Las Leyes de Pasión
- Jencarlos Canela as Xavier (Xavi) Castillo, Ana Sofia's ex-husband, recently hired to co-star on her show
- Diana-Maria Riva as Mimi Moncada, Ana Sofia's best friend and the show's clothing designer and seamstress
- Amaury Nolasco as Rodrigo Suarez, Ana Sofia's co-star who plays the show's villain
- Jose Moreno Brooks as Gael Garnica, Ana Sofia's gay friend and co-star who plays her love interest on the show
- Jadyn Douglas as Roxi Rios, the show's youngest cast member who is dimwitted yet insightful
- Alex Meneses as Isabela Santamaria, the telenovela's aging former leading lady and Ana Sofia's chief rival
- Izzy Diaz as Isaac Aguero, the show's head writer who drunkenly writes the episodes only to forget the scenes he wrote the next day

=== Recurring ===
- Zachary Levi as James McMahon, the new network president of VivaVision; much to Ana Sofia's irritation, he speaks more Spanish than she does.
- Juan Carlos Cantu as Gustavo
- Phillip Garcia as Paulo, the show's PA
- Luis Fernandez-Gil as Director
- Roselyn Sánchez cameo as a reporter on TV

== Production ==
On January 16, 2015, NBC ordered thirteen episodes. On October 19, 2015, the network cut its order to eleven episodes. In November, the show title was switched from the production title Hot & Bothered to Telenovela.

== Episodes ==
No.	Title	Directed by	Written by	Original release date	Prod. code	U.S. viewers (millions)
1	"Pilot"	Steve Pink	Story by : Chrissy Pietrosh & Jessica Goldstein and Robert Harling; Teleplay by : Chrissy Pietrosh & Jessica Goldstein	December 7, 2015	101	5.34
Ana Sofia is the star of the hit telenovela "Las Leyes de Pasión", without speaking a word of Spanish. The network decides to add to the show Ana's ex-husband Xavi, who had cheated on her. Now they compete to become the crew's favorite, and for the spotlight roles in the show, until Ana freaks out and Gael, the current hot lover in the show, starts stress eating. Ana and Mimi break into Xavi's yacht to take revenge but Xavi catches Ana and they apologize. Finally they perform a staged reunion kiss for the press and manage to star in the show together.
2	"Evil Twin"	Reginald Hudlin	Robert Sudduth	December 7, 2015	102	3.35
On Isabela's birthday, Ana has enough of all the secrets and lies and instates an open-book policy at the set, from which she learns of Mimi's (lack of a) sex life. She tries to match her up with Rodrigo, but there's a misunderstanding. Meanwhile, Isabela's identical twin Carmen arrives and befriends Gael, who tells her many stories about Isabela. When they discover that Carmen recorded all his secret stories of Isabela's wrongdoings and plans to include it in a tell-all book to ruin her, all friendships are off and Isabela fights with Carmen, which also marks the end of the open-book policy.
3	"Trapped in a Well"	Michael Weaver	Chrissy Pietrosh & Jessica Goldstein	December 28, 2015 (Note: The third episode was released online on December 7, 2015.)	103	2.23
To show off in front of Xavi, Ana calls Mimi her personal assistant, which majorly strains their friendship. In a series of accidents on set, a light drops on Ana's head and she fakes amnesia. In another accident, Ana and Mimi end up trapped in a stage well, which gives them time to reconcile. Rodrigo is jealous of Xavi because Xavi never needs to rehearse for anything. When Xavi finds out that Rodrigo had wanted to become a boy-band member just like him, they perform a song together.
4	"The Kiss"	Fred Goss	Melody Derloshon	January 4, 2016	104	4.56
Ana agrees to go on a date with James, but feels more comfortable playing her character while on the date than being herself. Meanwhile, Rodrigo and Roxi try to convince Xavi that the ghost of a deceased actor haunts the show's set.
5	"The Rivals"	Ken Whittingham	Leila Cohan-Miccio	January 11, 2016	105	3.61
Ana sets up a charity event to build a house for an underprivileged family, and the cast and crew from Las Leyes de Pasión pitch in to help, but they get upstaged at the building site by the cast and crew of a rival telenovela.
6	"The Hurricane"	Eva Longoria	Craig Gerard & Matthew Zinman	January 18, 2016	106	3.87
Ana bans all food because of the upcoming beach wear scenes, but then a hurricane hits and everyone is stuck in the studio with nothing to eat and the hapless Gael in charge as safety captain.
7	"The Grand Gesture"	Dylan K. Massin	Marcos Luevanos	January 25, 2016	107	3.29
Ana is having fun dating James, but his over-the-top attempts at showing his affection make her afraid that the relationship is moving way too fast. Meanwhile, Rodrigo loses his dressing room to Isaac in a poker game. When the guys set up the next game, Roxi wants in, and she turns out to be a better poker player than she let on.
8	"Sexual Awakening"	Victor Nelli, Jr.	Dannah Phirman & Danielle Schneider	February 1, 2016	108	3.06
When it is discovered that Mimi's son Connor has a photo of a half-dressed Ana under his mattress, the two women debate over whether or not he needs to have the sex talk. Meanwhile, the men of Las Leyes de Pasión are excited about an upcoming photo shoot for a magazine, until they hear that the photographer refuses to use any retouching techniques on the photos.
9	"Split Personalities"	David Warren	Josh Bycel & Jonathan Fener	February 8, 2016	109	3.34
Mimi's ex-husband Martin (Ricardo Antonio Chavira) gets out of prison looking hotter than ever and seems to have changed for the better, but Ana warns her friend not to fall for him again.
10	"Caught in the Act"	Fred Goss	Jameel Saleem	February 15, 2016	110	2.33
With Xavi trying to be the best man he can be for new girlfriend Kelly (Fiona Gubelmann), he asks Ana to point out all the things he used to do to bug her and she is delighted to do so. But the two spend so much time together remaking Xavi, Kelly gets jealous. Meanwhile, a pregnancy scene has Rodrigo regretting he never had children, but his discussions with Roxi and Gael lead him to believe an old affair may have produced a child that he doesn't know about.
11	"The Stalker"	Steve Pink	Chrissy Pietrosh & Jessica Goldstein	February 22, 2016	111	2.94
Ana is excited to learn she has a stalker, while she also considers rekindling her relationship with Xavi. When Xavi doesn't show up for their date, Ana learns her stalker is Kelly, who has kidnapped Xavi and is threatening his life. On the set, various cast members try to impress Isaac with their talents after learning he is writing a pilot for a new show.

== Broadcast ==
Telenovela premiered as a "preview" on December 7, 2015 on NBC. The series then moved to its regular Monday at 8:30 PM timeslot on December 21, 2015 as a mid-season replacement.

In the Philippines soon to air on A2Z and Kapamilya Channel dubbing in Filipino and theme song for "Rampa" song by Vice Ganda.

== Reception ==
=== Ratings ===
No.	Episode	Original air date	Timeslot (EST)	Viewers (millions)	Rating/share (Adults 18–49)
1	"Pilot"	December 7, 2015	Monday 10:00 pm	5.34	1.4/4
2	"Evil Twin"	December 7, 2015	Monday 10:30 pm	3.35	0.9/3
3	"Trapped in a Well"	December 28, 2015	Monday 9:30 pm	2.23	0.6/2
4	"The Kiss"	January 4, 2016	Monday 8:30 pm	4.56	1.3/4
5	"The Rivals"	January 11, 2016	Monday 8:30 pm	3.61	1.0/3
6	"The Hurricane"	January 18, 2016	Monday 8:30 pm	3.87	1.1/3
7	"The Grand Gesture"	January 25, 2016	Monday 8:30 pm	3.29	0.9/3
8	"Sexual Awakening"	February 1, 2016	Monday 8:30 pm	3.06	0.8/2
9	"Split Personalities"	February 8, 2016	Monday 8:30 pm	3.34	0.9/3
10	"Caught in the Act"	February 15, 2016	Monday 8:30 pm	2.33	0.7/2
11	"The Stalker"	February 22, 2016	Monday 8:30 pm	2.94	0.9/3

=== Critical reception ===
According to Metacritic, Telenovela currently holds a score of 62 out of 100, based on 21 critics indicating "generally favorable reviews". On another review aggregator website Rotten Tomatoes, the series holds a critical approval of 63%, based on 19 critics, with an average rating of 5.9/10. The site's critical consensus reads, "Featuring a likable cast led by a charming Eva Longoria, Telenovela is a comedy that provides entertainingly predictable laughs".
