= International Modeling and Talent Association =

American talent management organization

The International Modeling and Talent Association (IMTA) is a professional organization of modeling and talent training centers from around the world, who meet biannually for talent and modeling conventions in both New York City and Los Angeles.

Founded in 1987, IMTA conventions are week-long displays of modeling, acting, singing and dancing competitions where unsigned talent and models compete in hopes of being discovered by one of the nearly four-hundred fashion and talent agents, personal managers, casting directors, network representatives and music producers in attendance.

== History ==
After its first meeting in New York City in the summer of 1987, IMTA’s early conventions found actor Elijah Wood and model Joel West. Since then, actors and actresses such as Aaron Paul, Katie Holmes, Ashton Kutcher, Eva Longoria, Jessica Biel, Jeremy Sumpter, Seann William Scott, Brandon Routh, Sofia Vassilieva, Alyson Stoner, Josh Duhamel, and Ashley Greene have competed and gotten their start at the week-long convention, as well as models Jessica White and Tyson Ballou.

== Conventions ==
Held in January and July in Los Angeles and New York City, respectively, IMTA conventions are week-long events where thousands of models and talent compete and attend different acting and modeling competitions, runway shows and seminars in front of entertainment industry insiders and agents. At the end of the week, contestants are called back by the agents and managers to discuss possible future representation.

== Legitimacy ==
Questions have been raised regarding the legitimacy of IMTA and its conventions. A 2009 report on the program Dateline NBC found that almost every person who applied to attend an IMTA convention was accepted, with prices for attendance as high as $9,000 per person. Representatives from Elite Model Management and the Screen Actors Guild questioned these fees and other aspects of the IMTA process.

== See also ==
- List of modeling agencies
