= Briana Lane =

American actress and musician (born 1985)

- Born: October 27, 1985 (age 40); Los Angeles, California, U.S.
- Occupations: Actress, musician
- Years active: 2006–present
- Spouse: John Lange (m. 2015; died 2023)

Briana Lane (born October 27, 1985) is an American actress and musician. She is best known for her recurring roles on Freeform's Young & Hungry and Switched at Birth and her portrayal of Brook Lynn Quartermaine on ABC's General Hospital, for which she was nominated for a Daytime Emmy Award.

== Career ==
=== Acting ===
Lane's notable roles include American Horror Story, Extant, The New Normal, and Baby Daddy. She also guest-starred on Grace and Frankie, 9-1-1, American Housewife, NCIS, and All American.

In August 2020, Lane was announced as the recast for lead character Brook Lynn Quartermaine on the ABC Daytime soap opera General Hospital, with Amanda Setton on maternity leave. Lane played the role until November 16, 2020, and quickly became a fan favorite. On May 25, 2021, she was nominated for a Daytime Emmy for Outstanding Guest Performer in a Drama Series. In October 2022, Lane came back to play the character again.

=== Music ===
Musician Darian Zahedi of CRX (solo project of Nick Valensi of The Strokes) and Lane released a new single, "Bad", under a music project called Cadeaux. The track premiered on September 17, 2020. The single became a favorite at KCRW, with the station dubbing the song its Top Tune in 2020. Cadeaux released its next single, "Either Way" on February 24, 2022. In collaboration with Poolside and Ornament and Crime, their single "On and On" was released on July 21, 2023. Cadeaux's next single with Ornament and Crime, "Sparks in the Air", debuted in November 2023.

Lane is also half of the indie duo Winslow. Their song "Origami Tiger" was featured on the soundtrack of the film Luce, starring Octavia Spencer and Naomi Watts.

=== Hosting and writing ===
Lane got her start as a writer for an animated show on CBS interactive after graduating college, which led her to do on-camera hosting work for the network. She has hosted for E! News, MSN, and CBS. In 2015, she co-anchored a comedy news show called The Desk for Uproxx under Woven Digital.

== Personal life ==
Lane was born in Los Angeles, CA and attended Marymount High School. She graduated with a BA from UCLA's School of Film, Theater and Television, with an emphasis in musical theater.

She trained at Upright Citizens Brigade and performs with an indie comedy team.

Lane is a member of UNICEF's Next Gen and a longtime supporter of The Arthritis Foundation. She also supports the Huntington's Disease Society of America, and helps host fundraising events for the organization.

Lane was married to film editor John Lange from 2015 until his death on March 14, 2023.

== Filmography ==
Year	Title	Role	Notes
2009	Secret Girlfriend	Brenda	1 episode
2009	The Suite Life on Deck	Karina	1 episode (Ala-Ka-Scram!)
2009	Canned (ABC Pilot)	Ashley	Unaired
2009	Lovely Evening	Phaedra	
2009	Let's Get Laid	Tiffany	
2009	The Cellar	Sassy	
2010	Gigantic	Briana	1 episode
2010	The Bannen Way	Danielle	2 episodes
2010	The Whole Truth	Barb Leone	1 episode
2010	Law & Order: Los Angeles	Amy Moran	1 episode
2010	CSI: Crime Scene Investigation	Maddie	1 episode
2011	Drop Dead Diva	Sierra Santell	1 episode
2011	Mental	Mary-Jane	
2011	The Back-up Bride	Shelby	
2011	Bones	Sheila Burnside	1 episode
2011	Bri Squared	Bri	Pilot
2012	Beverly Hills Chihuahua 3: Viva la Fiesta!	Jenny	
2012	Baby Daddy	Cassie	1 episode
2012	The Wedding Band	Kristin	1 episode
2013	The New Normal	Clea	3 episodes
2013	Hawaii Five-0	Dahlia	1 episode
2013	Anger Management	Celeste	1 episode
2013	Wendell and Vinnie	Chrissy	1 episode
2013	Second Chances	Regina	
2013	Pop Star	Yvette	
2014	Switched at Birth	Christy Salz	2 episodes
2014	Real Housewives of Horror	Roxanne	6 episodes
2014	Oliver Stoned	Jennifer	Post-production
2015	Extant	Corinne	2 episodes
2015	Grimm	Stacy Balouzian	1 episode
2015	The Desk	News Anchor	164 episodes
2015	Austin & Ally	Beverly Robbins	1 episode
2015	A Kind of Magic	Lizzy	
2016	Young & Hungry	Dr. Rounds	4 episodes
2016	An American Girl Story - Melody 1963: Love Has to Win	Val	Direct-to-video
2016	What's News?	Various Characters	4 episodes
2017	Major Crimes	Shelley	1 episode
2017	The Last Tycoon	Susan	1 episode
2018	All American	Elaine	1 episode
2018	NCIS	Diane Boyle	1 episode
2018	9-1-1	Storm	1 episode
2018	All Night	Cindy	1 episode
2018	Stuck in the Middle	Jayden	1 episode
2018	Blood, Sweat and Lies	Leslie	Completed
2018	Couch People	Briana	4 episodes
2019	American Horror Story: 1984	Jess	1 episode
2020	American Housewife	Stephanie	1 episode
2020	12 Hour Shift	Cheryl Williams	Post-production
2020	One Nation Under God	Emma Sackson	Post-production
2020	Solve	Harriet	2 episodes
2020	Run Sweetheart Run	Secretary	
2020, 2022	General Hospital	Brook Lynn Quartermaine	41 episodes
2021	American Horror Story: Double Feature	Dr. Richards	2 episodes
2021	Terrordactyl: Extinction USA	Dr. Rachel	
2022	Grace and Frankie	Mia	1 episode
2022	Nora	Bianca	Post-production
2023	9-1-1: Lone Star	Pastor Nicole	1 episode

== Awards and nominations ==
Year	Award	Category	Work	Result	Ref.
2021	Daytime Emmy Awards	Outstanding Guest Performer in a Drama Series	General Hospital	Nominated	
