= David Holden (screenwriter) =

American television producer and writer

- Other name: Dave Holden
- Occupations: Television producer, television writer
- Years active: 2001–present

David Holden is an American television producer and television writer. His producing and writing credits include Undressed, The War at Home, Accidentally on Purpose, Shake It Up, and Young & Hungry, which he created.
