= Young & Hungry =

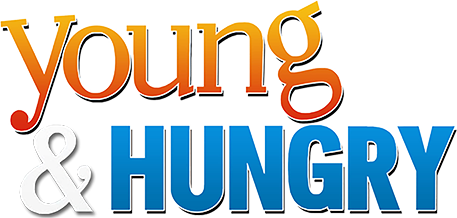
- Genre: Sitcom; Romantic comedy
- Created by: David Holden
- Starring: Emily Osment; Jonathan Sadowski; Aimee Carrero; Kym Whitley; Rex Lee
- Theme music composer: Shridhar Solanki & Sidh Solanki
- Opening theme: "I Like That" (seasons 2-5)
- Composer: Christopher M. French
- Country of origin: United States
- Original language: English
- No. of seasons: 5
- No. of episodes: 71 (list of episodes)

Production
- Executive producers: Ashley Tisdale; David Holden; Eric Tannenbaum; Kim Tannenbaum; Jessica Rhoades; John Ziffren; Caryn Lucas; David Hartle; Tony Carey
- Producers: Devon Kelly; Kevin C. Slattery; Michael Dow; David Hartle
- Camera setup: Multi-camera
- Running time: 22 minutes
- Production companies: Waffle Toaster Productions (season 5); Blondie Girl Productions; Relativity Television (seasons 1–2); Critical Content (seasons 3-5); The Tannenbaum Company; CBS Television Studios

Original release
- Network: Freeform
- Release: June 25, 2014 – July 25, 2018

Young & Hungry is an American romantic sitcom created by David Holden. The multi-camera series starred Emily Osment, Jonathan Sadowski, Aimee Carrero, Kym Whitley and Rex Lee, and premiered on ABC Family (now known as Freeform) on June 25, 2014. On March 7, 2016, Freeform renewed the series for a fourth season, which premiered on June 1, 2016, and concluded on August 3, 2016. On October 24, 2016, Osment announced via Twitter that Young & Hungry was renewed for a fifth season. On March 15, 2018, it was officially announced that the fifth season would be the last. The final ten episodes premiered on June 20, 2018, and concluded on July 25, 2018. A series finale movie was initially announced with the cancellation, but was scrapped on August 24, 2018. Young & Hungry received generally mixed reviews from critics.

== Premise ==
Set in San Francisco, wealthy tech entrepreneur Josh Kaminski hires Gabi Diamond as his personal chef. The two have a one-night stand after having a bit of trouble on Gabi's trial dinner. The series follows the two and their lives. The dynamic follows the couple's relationship and love life. Gabi faces challenges both in and outside of the kitchen.

Gabi lives in an apartment with her best friend, Sofia (AKA 'lil SoSo). They constantly get into crazy antics thanks to Gabi's elaborate plans.

== Cast and characters ==
=== Main ===
- Emily Osment as Gabi Diamond, a young chef from Florida who lives in San Francisco. She is named after and inspired by San Francisco food blogger Gabi Moskowitz. Osment describes her character as "a fun, ditzy, energetic blonde, but she also makes sure to put herself first. Sometimes she gets a little wrapped up in what's going on with her relationship with Josh, but she always goes back to what's most important for her."
- Jonathan Sadowski as Josh Kaminski, a young nerdy tech entrepreneur and self-made millionaire.
- Aimee Carrero as Sofia Rodriguez, Gabi's best friend and roommate. She is a strong-minded and career-driven young woman with a degree from University of Florida.
- Kym Whitley as Yolanda, Josh's housekeeper
- Rex Lee as Elliot Park, Josh's publicist and right-hand-man. He is an openly gay Korean-American.

=== Recurring ===
- Mallory Jansen as Caroline Penelope Huntington (season 1), Josh's girlfriend turned ex-fiancée
- Jesse McCartney as Cooper Finley (season 1–2), a nerdy computer hacker that Josh hires to work for him
- Bryan Safi as Alan (season 2–5), Elliot's lover and later husband
- Chris Smith as Nick Walker (season 5), a cocky immigration lawyer who becomes Sofia's boyfriend

=== Guest stars ===
- Ashley Tisdale as Logan Rawlings, who publishes a "30 under 30" list for a popular magazine. When she appears to be attracted to Gabi, Elliott sets them up to go on a date in the hope of securing Josh a spot on her list. She heads a media company called Click'd in season 4 and hires Sofia as her assistant.
- Kylie Minogue as Shauna, a tech reporter for ABC News with whom Josh has a fling in the episodes of season 2 entitled "Young & Moving" & "Young & Ferris Wheel". Shauna has a seven-year-old son named Brett, and an estranged adult daughter, Danielle, but when Gabi reunites Shauna with Danielle, they realize that Josh has had trysts with both of them.
- Keegan Allen as Tyler, a drummer Sofia pressures Gabi to date to deal with working for Josh again. A double date with Josh and woman from Gabi and Sofia's building reveals Tyler is actually homeless.
- Cheryl Hines as Kathy Kaminski, Josh's mother who has a drinking problem
- Jerry O'Connell as Nick Diamond, Gabi's father who becomes romantically involved with Josh's mother, Kathy, much to the shock of Gabi and Josh
- Briana Lane as Dr. Jessica Rounds (season 3), Josh's therapist, who falls for Josh when he helps take her injured dog to the animal hospital
- Demi Mills as Keisha (season 4), Elliot and Alan's 13-year-old foster child
- Heather Dubrow as Natasha Cook-Campbell, a celebrity chef and lifestyle guru who is one of Gabi's idols
- Betty White as Ms. Bernice Wilson, Gabi's downstairs apartment neighbor, who gives her romantic advice. Ms. Wilson reunites with an old lover named Bernie (Carl Reiner) in the episode "Young & Vegas Baby". This was Betty White's final on-camera acting role before her death in 2021.
- Andy Buckley as Matt Danon, Josh's estranged father
- Jose Moreno Brooks as Juan Carlos (season 5), a guy in Mexico who charms Sofia

Celebrity chef and television personalities have also appeared in the show as themselves including Michael Voltaggio, Rachael Ray, Giada de Laurentiis, and Alex Guarnaschelli.

== Development and production ==
The show is inspired by San Francisco food blogger Gabi Moskowitz. On August 23, 2013, ABC Family placed a pilot order. The pilot was written by David Holden and directed by Andy Cadiff. Ashley Tisdale, Eric Tannenbaum, Kim Tannenbaum, and Jessica Rhoades serve as executive producers.

Filming for the pilot started on April 21, 2014. On January 6, 2014, ABC Family placed a series order on Young & Hungry, with the premiere on June 25, 2014, alongside the comedy Mystery Girls. On September 29, 2014 the network renewed Young & Hungry for a second season. On June 24, 2014 the first webisode was released with Gabi Moskowitz starring.

=== Book ===
On April 11, 2017 a book titled "Young & Hungry: Your Complete Guide to a Delicious Life" was published.

=== Casting ===
Casting announcements began in September 2013, with Emily Osment first cast in the lead role of Gabi Diamond, a blunt and klutzy food blogger who not only has a true gift for cooking, but also the ability to figure out what it is people want to eat. Aimee Carrero was the next actor cast in the series regular role of Sofia Rodriguez, Gabi's best friend and an ambitious banking intern. Shortly after, Jonathan Sadowski and Rex Lee were cast in the series, with Sadowski playing the lead role of Josh Kaminski, a young tech entrepreneur who hires Gabi as his personal chef; and Lee cast as Elliot Park, Josh's high-strung personal aide and right-hand-man. Kym Whitley was the last actor cast in the series regular role of Yolanda, Josh's housekeeper. MTV announced Australian singer Kylie Minogue as a guest star in the second season as a potential new love interest for Josh.

== Series overview ==
Season	Episodes		Originally released	
Season	Episodes		First released	Last released
1	10		June 25, 2014	August 27, 2014
2	20		March 25, 2015	October 14, 2015
Special			November 24, 2015	
3	10		February 3, 2016	April 6, 2016
4	10		June 1, 2016	August 3, 2016
5	20	10	March 13, 2017	May 22, 2017
5	20	10	June 20, 2018	July 25, 2018

== Release ==
=== Broadcast ===
In Australia, the series premiered on July 25, 2015 on FOX8. In Turkey, the series airs on Dizimax Drama. In the Netherlands the series started on August 21, 2016 on Comedy Central. In the United Kingdom, the show started airing on November 14, 2016 on E4. In India, the first two seasons of the show aired in 2016 on Zee Café.

In Italy only the first four seasons were broadcast by Rai 3 from 2016 to 2018.

=== Streaming ===
Young & Hungry was available on Netflix until the show was removed in August 2022 and moved to Disney+ in select countries.

== Reception ==
=== Critical response ===
On Rotten Tomatoes, the first season holds a rating of 43%, based on 7 reviews, with an average rating of 4.9/10. Metacritic, which uses a weighted average, assigned the first season a score of 48 out of 100, based on 5 critics, indicating "mixed or average reviews".

Neal Justin of Star Tribune said, "Hannah Montana veteran Osment obviously learned a thing or two about hamming it up for the camera from Miley Cyrus. She has so much energy — dancing while she cooks, babbling nonsensical phrases, darting around the spacious pad — that by the end of the first episode, viewers might feel winded. The jokes are also full of life — and naughtiness. When she spots the lavish refrigerator in the kitchen, she practically wraps herself around it." Gail Pennington of St. Louis Post-Dispatch stated that the show is "grounded by the charms of Emily Osment," asserting, "Young & Hungry is nicely paced, and even in the first episode, the humor is character-driven. It's as uncomplicated, and tasty, as a good grilled cheese."

Lea Palmieri of Decider wrote, "Young & Hungry works because it openly admits, life is complicated and we do silly things and get ourselves into sticky situations, because we're all just trying to figure it out—so why not have some fun in the process? The show is not afraid to take on substantial topics while keeping it light. Kind of like a TV cream puff. If you feel a twinge of nostalgia for the family sitcoms of the past, but acknowledge that you're growing up, no matter how reluctantly that may be, give Young & Hungry a try. The show is funny and it's bold and it's paving the way for more shows that we'll look back on fondly from the next decade." Mary McNamara of Los Angeles Times stated, "Mixed would be Young & Hungry, a more than occasionally funny show in which Gabi (Emily Osment), an appealing but financially challenged food blogger, becomes personal chef to Josh (Jonathan Sadowski), an appealing but romantically challenged tech-ionaire. Executive produced by Ashley Tisdale, Young & Hungry feels much more Disney Channel than ABC Family. And that's not just because Osment is late of Hannah Montana. Osment is an accomplished physical and verbal comedian who is always fun to watch."

=== Ratings ===
Young & Hungry : U.S. viewers per episode (millions)

Season	Episode number																					Average
Season	1	2	3	4	5	6	7	8	9	10	11	12	13	14	15	16	17	18	19	20	21	Average
1	1.09	2.77	1.91	2.90	1.76	2.93	2.85	2.89	1.85	2.62	–											2.35
2	1.77	1.73	1.76	1.68	1.77	1.60	1.57	1.59	1.97	1.93	1.85	1.60	1.71	1.76	1.60	1.81	1.68	1.78	1.63	1.55	1.65	1.71
3	1.65	1.53	1.57	1.62	1.44	1.53	1.52	1.45	1.59	1.54	–											1.54
4	1.53	1.65	1.65	1.63	1.52	1.56	1.57	1.44	1.51	1.53	–											1.55
5	1.49	1.36	1.43	1.43	1.37	1.33	1.42	1.42	1.37	1.55	1.33	1.31	1.32	1.29	1.31	1.31	1.22	1.21	1.30	1.29	–	1.35

Audience measurement performed by Nielsen Media Research

=== Accolades ===
Year	Award	Category	Nominee(s)	Result	Ref.
2014	Teen Choice Awards	Choice Summer TV Show	Young & Hungry	Nominated	
2014	Teen Choice Awards	Choice Summer TV Star: Female	Emily Osment	Nominated	
2015	People's Choice Awards	Favorite Cable TV Comedy	Young & Hungry	Nominated	
2015	Teen Choice Awards	Choice TV Show: Comedy	Young & Hungry	Nominated	
2015	Teen Choice Awards	Choice TV Actress: Comedy	Emily Osment	Nominated	
2015	Teen Choice Awards	Choice TV: Scene Stealer	Ashley Tisdale	Nominated	
2016	People's Choice Awards	Favorite Cable TV Comedy	Young & Hungry	Nominated	
2016	Teen Choice Awards	Choice Summer TV Show	Young & Hungry	Nominated	
2016	Teen Choice Awards	Choice Summer TV Star: Female	Emily Osment	Nominated	
2016	Imagen Awards	Best Primetime Television Program – Comedy	Young & Hungry	Nominated	
2017	Teen Choice Awards	Choice Comedy TV Show	Young & Hungry	Nominated	

== Spin-off ==
During April 2016, it was confirmed that Young & Hungry would possibly spawn a spin-off series titled Young & Sofia centered on Gabi's best friend, Sofia Rodriguez. In May 2016, cast details surfaced with Aimee Carrero starring as Sofia Rodriguez; Ashley Tisdale as Logan Rawlings, Sofia's overbearing boss at Click'd Media; Steve Talley as Kendrick; and Ryan Pinkston as Leo. The spin-off was introduced in the eighth episode of season four, but ultimately was not picked up.
