= Jose Moreno Brooks =

American actor

- Born: July 3, 1985 (age 41); San Jose, California
- Other name: Jose Brooks
- Education: University of California, Los Angeles
- Occupation: Actor
- Years active: 2010–present

Jose Moreno Brooks is an American actor best known for playing Gael Garnica on the NBC comedy Telenovela.

== Early life ==
Growing up in San Jose, California, Brooks attended Bellarmine College Preparatory. He graduated from University of California, Los Angeles with a degree in Economics and Philosophy, but decided to pursue modeling and acting. He also played semi-pro soccer. His mother is of Mexican descent and his father has Irish and English ancestry.

== Career ==
Brooks starred in MTV's One Bad Choice as Stephan Perez in the re-telling of his true-life story. His other credits include guest roles on The Nine Lives of Chloe King, The Game and Big Time Rush. In February 2015, Brooks was cast as Gael Garnica in the NBC comedy Telenovela.

== Personal life ==
On February 14, 2021, Brooks revealed on Instagram that he was engaged to Senior Vice President of Business Affairs at NBCUniversal Media, Erica Silverstein.

== Filmography ==
Year	Title	Role	Notes	References
2010	Big Time Rush	Cole	Episode: "Welcome Back Big Time"	
2010	Before My Eyes	Tyler Lopez	Short, credited as Jose Brooks	
2011	The Nine Lives of Chloe King	Xavier	2 episodes, credited as Jose Brooks	
2012	The Game	Ernesto	Credited as Jose Brooks	
2015	One Bad Choice	Stephan Perez		
2015–2016	Telenovela	Gael Garnica	Regular	
TBD	Mikael	Jesse Salcido	Actor, producer, editor	
2016	Jane the Virgin	Greg	Episode: "Chapter Thirty-Two"	
2016	Baby Daddy	Roger	2 episodes: "Stupid Cupid", "Condom Conundrum"	
2018	Young & Hungry	Juan Carlo	2 episodes: "Young & Mexico, Part 1"; "Young & Mexico Part 2"	
2018	Mom	Alfonso	1 episode: "Phone Confetti and a Wee Dingle"	
