= Winslow (band) =

American indie rock band

- Origin: Los Angeles, California
- Genres: Indie rock
- Years active: 2018–present
- Members: Kate Miner; Briana Lane
- Website: www.thebandwinslow.com

Winslow is an indie rock band from Los Angeles, California. Kate Miner and Briana Lane make up the female indie duo.

Winslow released their first two singles, "Look at Me Now" and "Out of My Head" off their self-titled EP, Winslow, on June 22, 2018.

Their third single, a cover of "Conversation 16" by The National, was released on July, 6th 2018.

The video for "Out of My Head" was directed by Nora Kirkpatrick of Edward Sharpe and the Magnetic Zeros.

In 2019, "Origami Tiger", the last single off of their self titled EP, Winslow, is featured in the indie feature Luce starring Naomi Watts and Octavia Spencer.

== Discography ==
Singles
Title	Year	Album
"Out of My Head"	2018	Winslow
"Look at Me Now"	2018	Winslow
"Conversation 16"	2018	Winslow
"Origami Tiger"	2018	Winslow

== Band members ==
- Kate Miner – vocals, guitar, piano (2018–present)
- Briana Lane – vocals, keyboard, synthesizer (2018–present)
- Tobias Urbanczyk – drums, guitar (2018–present)
