= List of awards and nominations received by Zendaya =

Zendaya awards and nominations
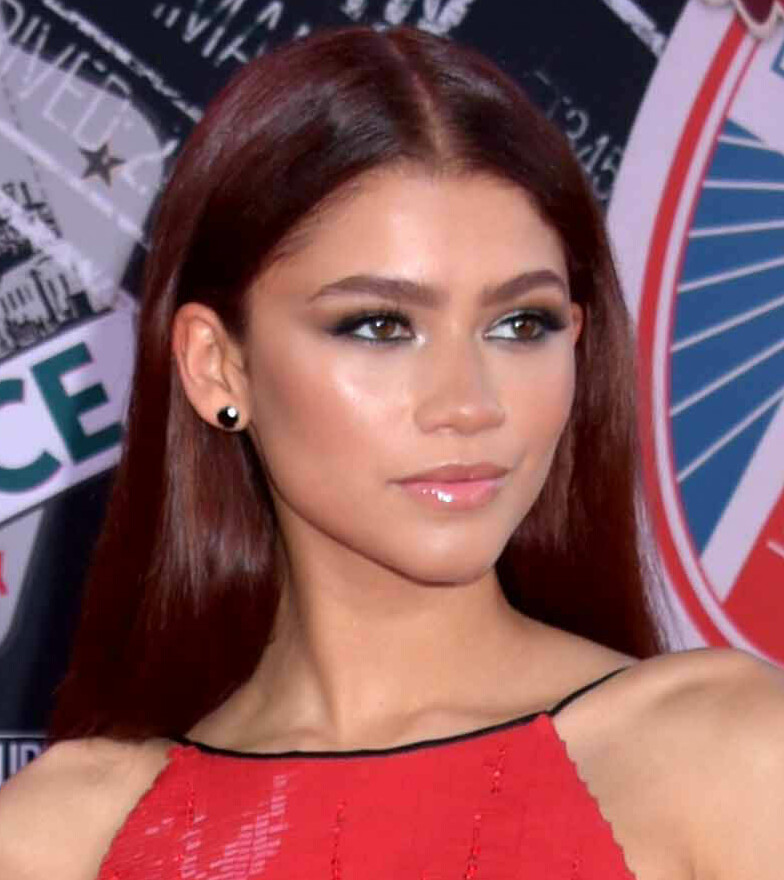
- Zendaya in 2019
Awards and nominations
| Award | Wins | Nominations |
| Actor Awards | 0 | 1 |
| Critics' Choice Awards | 3 | 7 |
| Golden Globes | 1 | 3 |
| Emmy Awards | 2 | 6 |

Totals (Note: Certain award groups do not simply award one winner. They acknowledge several different recipients, have runners-up, and have third place. Since this is a specific recognition and is different from losing an award, runner-up mentions are considered wins in this award tally. For simplification and to avoid errors, each award in this list has been presumed to have had a prior nomination.)
- Wins: 38
- Nominations: 121

Zendaya is an American actress and singer who has received various accolades throughout her career, including two Primetime Emmy Awards, a Critics' Choice Award, a Golden Globe Award, a Satellite Award, and a Saturn Award, as well as earning nominations for an AACTA Award and a SAG-AFTRA's Actor Award.

From 2010 to 2013, Zendaya starred alongside Bella Thorne in the Disney Channel sitcom Shake It Up. For her performance as Rocky Blue and her work on the show's soundtrack, she was nominated for two NAACP Image Awards, one Radio Disney Music Award and three Young Artist Awards. She played the titular character in the sitcom K.C. Undercover (2015–2018), which won her three Kids' Choice Awards for Favorite Female TV Star.

Her film roles include a supporting part as a trapeze artist in the musical drama The Greatest Showman (2017), for which she won various Kids' Choice Awards and Teen Choice Awards, and the leading role in the romantic-drama Malcolm & Marie (2021), which she also produced and earned her a nomination for the Critics' Choice Movie Award for Best Actress. Zendaya has portrayed MJ in the Marvel Cinematic Universe starting from the 2017 film Spider-Man: Homecoming, and won the Saturn Award for Best Supporting Actress for its sequel Far from Home (2019). She produced and starred in the Luca Guadagnino-directed sports comedy film Challengers (2024), for which she was nominated for the Golden Globe Award for Best Actress in a Motion Picture – Musical or Comedy.

From 2019 to 2026, Zendaya executively produced and starred in the HBO teen drama series Euphoria as main character Rue Bennett, for which she won two Primetime Emmy Awards for Outstanding Lead Actress in a Drama Series. At age 24, she is the youngest winner of the Drama Lead Actress category in history and also the second African American to win the award, following Viola Davis. She received four nominations at the 74th Primetime Emmy Awards, including Outstanding Drama Series, making her the youngest producer nominee ever at the Emmy Awards. For this role, she also won the Golden Globe Award for Best Actress in a Television Series – Drama along with a BET Award, three Black Reel Awards, a Critics' Choice Award, and a Satellite Award, while she was nominated for an Actor Award.

== Major associations ==
=== Actor Awards ===
The Actor Awards are organized by the Screen Actors Guild‐American Federation of Television and Radio Artists (SAG-AFTRA). First awarded in 1995, the awards aim to recognize excellent achievements in film and television.

| Year | Nominated work | Category | Result | Ref. |
|---|---|---|---|---|
| 2023 | Euphoria | Outstanding Performance by a Female Actor in a Drama Series | Nominated | |

=== Critics' Choice Awards ===
The Critics Choice Association (CCA) is a Canadian American association of television, radio and online critics that each year organizes various award shows that honor the finest in cinematic or television achievement; these include the Critics' Choice Awards (for both films and television), the Critics' Choice Super Awards, and the Celebration of Cinema and Television ceremony.

| Year | Nominated work | Category | Result | Ref. |
Movie Awards
| 2021 | Malcolm & Marie | Best Actress | Nominated | |
| 2021 | Zendaya | #SeeHer Award | Won | |
Television Awards
| 2020 | Euphoria | Best Actress in a Drama Series | Nominated | |
| 2023 | Euphoria | Best Actress in a Drama Series | Won | |
Super Awards
| 2022 | Spider-Man: No Way Home | Best Actress in a Superhero Movie | Nominated | |
| 2025 | Dune: Part Two | Best Actress in a Science Fiction/Fantasy Movie | Nominated | |
Celebration of Black Cinema Awards
| 2021 | Malcolm & Marie | NextGen Award (shared with John David Washington) | Won | |

=== Golden Globe Awards ===
The Golden Globes are accolades bestowed by the Hollywood Foreign Press Association (HFPA) to recognize excellence in both American and international film and television productions.

| Year | Nominated work | Category | Result | Ref. |
|---|---|---|---|---|
| 2023 | Euphoria | Best Actress in a Television Series – Drama | Won | |
| 2025 | Challengers | Best Motion Picture – Musical or Comedy (Note: The awards for Best Motion Picture – Drama and Best Motion Picture – Musical or Comedy are given to the individual producers accredited by the Producers Guild of America for those motion pictures.) (Note: Shared with the producers of Challengers.) | Nominated | |
| 2025 | Challengers | Best Actress in a Motion Picture – Musical or Comedy | Nominated | |

=== Primetime Emmy Awards ===
The Primetime Emmy Award is an American award bestowed by the Academy of Television Arts & Sciences (ATAS) in recognition of excellence in American primetime television programming.

| Year | Nominated work | Category | Result | Ref. |
|---|---|---|---|---|
| 2020 | Euphoria (episode: "Made You Look") | Outstanding Lead Actress in a Drama Series | Won | |
| 2022 | Euphoria (season 2) | Outstanding Drama Series (Note: Shared with the producers of Euphoria.) | Nominated | |
| 2022 | Euphoria (episode: "Stand Still Like the Hummingbird") | Outstanding Lead Actress in a Drama Series | Won | |
| 2022 | "Elliot's Song" | Outstanding Original Music and Lyrics (shared with Labrinth and Muz) | Nominated | |
| 2022 | "I'm Tired" | Outstanding Original Music and Lyrics (shared with Labrinth and Sam Levinson) | Nominated | |
| 2026 | Euphoria (episode: "In God We Trust") | Outstanding Lead Actress in a Drama Series | Nominated | |

== Miscellaneous awards ==
=== AACTA International Awards ===
The AACTA International Awards are presented annually by the Australian Academy of Cinema and Television Arts (AACTA) to recognize and honor achievements in the global film and television industry.

| Year | Nominated work | Category | Result | Ref. |
|---|---|---|---|---|
| 2023 | Euphoria | Best Actress in a Series | Nominated | |

=== BET Awards ===
The BET Awards are an American award show established by the Black Entertainment Television (BET) network to celebrate African Americans and other American minorities in music, acting, sports, and other fields of entertainment over the past year.

| Year | Nominated work | Category | Result | Ref. |
|---|---|---|---|---|
| 2014 | Zendaya | YoungStars Award | Nominated | |
| 2015 | Zendaya | YoungStars Award | Nominated | |
| 2020 | Zendaya | Best Actress | Nominated | |
| 2021 | Zendaya | Best Actress | Nominated | |
| 2022 | Zendaya | Best Actress | Won | |
| 2023 | Zendaya | Best Actress | Nominated | |
| 2025 | Zendaya | Best Actress | Nominated | |
| 2026 | Zendaya | Fashion Vanguard Award | Nominated | |

=== Black Reel Awards ===
The Black Reel Awards are an annual American awards ceremony hosted by the Foundation for the Augmentation of African Americans in Film (FAAAF) to recognize excellence of African Americans, as well as the cinematic achievements of the African diaspora, in the global film industry, as assessed by the Foundation's voting membership.

| Year | Nominated work | Category | Result | Ref. |
|---|---|---|---|---|
| 2020 | Euphoria | Outstanding Actress, Drama Series | Won | |
| 2021 | Malcolm & Marie | Outstanding Actress | Nominated | |
| 2021 | Malcolm & Marie | Outstanding Breakthrough Performance, Female | Nominated | |
| 2022 | Euphoria | Outstanding Actress, Drama Series | Won | |
| 2022 | "I'm Tired" | Outstanding Original Song (shared with Labrinth and Sam Levinson) | Won | |
| 2025 | Challengers | Outstanding Film | Nominated | |
| 2025 | Challengers | Outstanding Lead Performance | Nominated | |
| 2026 | Euphoria | Outstanding Lead Performance, Drama Series | Nominated | |

=== CFDA Fashion Awards ===
The CFDA Fashion Awards are an annual ceremony hosted by the Council of Fashion Designers of America (CFDA). They were founded in 1980 to honor excellence in fashion design.

| Year | Nominated work | Category | Result | Ref. |
|---|---|---|---|---|
| 2021 | Zendaya | Fashion Icon | Won | |

=== CinemaCon Awards ===
The CinemaCon is an annual convention controlled by the National Association of Theatre Owners (NATO) which bestows various awards that honor cinematic achievements each year.

| Year | Nominated work | Category | Result | Ref. |
|---|---|---|---|---|
| 2023 | Zendaya | Star of the Year Award | Won | |

=== Dorian Awards ===
The Dorian Awards are film and television accolades given by GALECA: The Society of LGBTQ Entertainment Critics, founded in 2009 as the Gay and Lesbian Entertainment Critics Association.

| Year | Nominated work | Category | Result | Ref. |
|---|---|---|---|---|
| 2022 | Euphoria | Best TV Performance | Nominated | |
| 2026 | Euphoria | Best TV Performance – Drama | Nominated | |

=== Glamour Awards ===
The Glamour Awards is an annual set of awards hosted by Glamour to honor "extraordinary and inspirational" women from a variety of fields, including entertainment, business, sports, music, science, medicine, education and politics.

| Year | Nominated work | Category | Result | Ref. |
|---|---|---|---|---|
| 2016 | Zendaya | The Voice for Girls | Won | |

=== Gotham Awards ===
The Gotham Awards are American film awards presented by the Gotham Film & Media Institute to honor the makers of independent films.

| Year | Nominated work | Category | Result | Ref. |
|---|---|---|---|---|
| 2024 | Challengers | Best Feature | Nominated | |
| 2024 | Challengers | Spotlight Tribute | Won | |

=== IGN Awards ===
IGN is an American video game and entertainment media website operated by IGN Entertainment Inc.

| Year | Nominated work | Category | Result | Ref. |
|---|---|---|---|---|
| 2019 | Euphoria | Best Dramatic TV Performance | Nominated | |

=== iHeart Radio Music Awards ===
The iHeartRadio Music Awards is a music awards show that celebrates music heard throughout the year across iHeartMedia radio stations nationwide and on iHeartRadio, iHeartMedia's digital music platform.

| Year | Nominated work | Category | Result | Ref. |
|---|---|---|---|---|
| 2016 | Zendaya | Biggest Triple Threat | Nominated | |

=== Jupiter Awards ===
The Jupiter Awards is a German annual cinema award show. It is Germany's biggest audience award for cinema and TV and is awarded annually by Cinema magazine and TV Spielfilm in eleven categories.

| Year | Nominated work | Category | Result | Ref. |
|---|---|---|---|---|
| 2025 | Challengers | Best International Actress | Won | |

=== MTV Movie & TV Awards ===
The MTV Movie & TV Awards is an annual award show presented by MTV to honor outstanding achievements in films. Founded in 1992, the winners of the awards are decided online by the audience.

| Year | Nominated work | Category | Result | Ref. |
|---|---|---|---|---|
| 2021 | Malcolm & Marie | Best Performance in a Movie | Nominated | |
| 2022 | Euphoria | Best Performance in a Show | Won | |
| 2022 | Spider-Man: No Way Home | Best Kiss (shared with Tom Holland) | Nominated | |

=== NAACP Image Awards ===
The NAACP Image Awards are an annual awards ceremony presented by the US-based National Association for the Advancement of Colored People (NAACP) to honor outstanding performances in film, television, music, and literature.

| Year | Nominated work | Category | Result | Ref. |
|---|---|---|---|---|
| 2012 | Shake It Up | Outstanding Performance by a Youth | Nominated | |
| 2014 | Shake It Up | Outstanding Performance by a Youth | Nominated | |
| 2022 | Malcolm & Marie | Outstanding Actress in a Motion Picture | Nominated | |
| 2023 | Euphoria | Outstanding Actress in a Drama Series | Nominated | |
| 2023 | Zendaya | Entertainer of the Year | Nominated | |

=== National Film Awards Awards ===
The National Film Awards UK are accolades presented by the National Film Academy, celebrating the achievements of established and independent filmmakers, actors, actresses, casting directors, production companies, and crew who make up the motion picture industry.

| Year | Nominated work | Category | Result | Ref. |
|---|---|---|---|---|
| 2026 | The Drama | Best Actress | Nominated | |

=== Nickelodeon Kids' Choice Awards ===
The Nickelodeon Kids' Choice Awards are an annual American children's awards ceremony show that is produced by Nickelodeon.

| Year | Nominated work | Category | Result | Ref. |
|---|---|---|---|---|
| 2016 | K.C. Undercover | Favorite Female TV Star | Won | |
| 2017 | K.C. Undercover | Favorite Female TV Star | Won | |
| 2018 | K.C. Undercover | Favorite Female TV Star | Nominated | |
| 2018 | Spider-Man: Homecoming and The Greatest Showman | Favorite Movie Actress | Won | |
| 2019 | K.C. Undercover | Favorite Female TV Star | Won | |
| 2019 | Smallfoot | Favorite Female Voice from an Animated Movie | Nominated | |
| 2020 | Spider-Man: Far from Home | Favorite Movie Actress | Nominated | |
| 2022 | Dune and Spider-Man: No Way Home | Favorite Movie Actress | Won | |
| 2024 | Dune: Part Two | Favorite Movie Actress | Nominated | |
| 2026 | Spider-Man: Brand New Day | Favorite Movie Actress | Won | |

=== People's Choice Awards ===
The People's Choice Awards is an American awards show, recognizing people in entertainment, voted online by the general public and fans.

| Year | Nominated work | Category | Result | Ref. |
|---|---|---|---|---|
| 2019 | Euphoria | Favorite Drama TV Star of the Year | Won | |
| 2019 | Spider-Man: Far from Home | Favorite Female Movie Star of the Year | Won | |
| 2020 | Zendaya | Favorite Style Star of the Year | Won | |
| 2022 | Euphoria | Favorite Drama TV Star of the Year | Nominated | |

=== Radio Disney Music Awards ===
The Radio Disney Music Awards (RDMA) is an annual awards show operated and governed by Radio Disney, an American radio network.

| Year | Nominated work | Category | Result | Ref. |
|---|---|---|---|---|
| 2013 | "Fashion Is My Kryptonite" | Best Music Video (shared with Bella Thorne) | Nominated | |
| 2014 | Zendaya | Breakout Artist | Nominated | |
| 2014 | Zendaya | Best Style | Won | |
| 2015 | Zendaya | Best Style | Nominated | |
| 2016 | Zendaya | Best Style | Nominated | |

=== Satellite Awards ===
The Satellite Awards are annual awards given by the International Press Academy that are commonly noted in entertainment industry journals and blogs.

| Year | Nominated work | Category | Result | Ref. |
|---|---|---|---|---|
| 2020 | Euphoria | Best Actress in a Drama / Genre Series | Won | |
| 2021 | Euphoria: "Trouble Don't Last Always" | Best Actress in a Miniseries or Television Film | Nominated | |
| 2023 | Euphoria | Best Actress in a Drama / Genre Series | Nominated | |

=== Saturn Awards ===
The Saturn Awards are American awards presented annually by the Academy of Science Fiction, Fantasy and Horror Films. They were initially created to honor science fiction, fantasy, and horror on film, but have since grown to reward other films belonging to genre fiction, as well as television and home media releases.

| Year | Nominated work | Category | Result | Ref. |
|---|---|---|---|---|
| 2018 | Spider-Man: Homecoming | Best Performance by a Younger Actor | Nominated | |
| 2019 | Spider-Man: Far from Home | Best Supporting Actress | Won | |
| 2022 | Spider-Man: No Way Home | Best Actress | Nominated | |
| 2025 | Dune: Part Two | Best Supporting Actress | Nominated | |

=== Shorty Awards ===
The Shorty Awards is an annual awards show recognizing the people and organizations that produce real-time short form content across Twitter, Facebook, YouTube, Instagram, TikTok, Twitch and the rest of the social web.

| Year | Nominated work | Category | Result | Ref. |
|---|---|---|---|---|
| 2020 | Zendaya | Best Celebrity | Won | |

=== Teen Choice Awards ===
The Teen Choice Awards are an annual awards show that airs on the Fox television network. The awards honor the year's biggest achievements in music, film, sports, television, fashion, social media, and more, voted by viewers living in the US, aged 13 and over, through various social media sites.

| Year | Nominated work | Category | Result | Ref. |
|---|---|---|---|---|
| 2014 | Zendaya | Choice Music Breakout Artist | Nominated | |
| 2014 | Zendaya | Choice Candie's Style Icon | Won | |
| 2015 | K.C. Undercover | Choice TV Actress Comedy | Nominated | |
| 2016 | "Something New" | Choice Music R&B/Hip-Hop Song | Nominated | |
| 2016 | Zendaya | Choice Style Female | Won | |
| 2017 | K.C. Undercover | Choice TV Actress Comedy | Nominated | |
| 2017 | Spider-Man: Homecoming | Choice Summer Movie Actress | Won | |
| 2017 | Spider-Man: Homecoming | Choice Breakout Movie Star | Nominated | |
| 2017 | Zendaya | Choice Twit | Nominated | |
| 2017 | Zendaya | Choice Style Icon | Nominated | |
| 2017 | Zendaya | Choice Female Hottie | Nominated | |
| 2018 | The Greatest Showman | Choice Movie Actress Drama | Won | |
| 2018 | The Greatest Showman | Choice Movie Ship (shared with Zac Efron) | Won | |
| 2018 | The Greatest Showman | Choice Liplock (shared with Zac Efron) | Nominated | |
| 2018 | "Rewrite the Stars" | Choice Collaboration (shared with Zac Efron) | Won | |
| 2018 | Zendaya | Choice Style Icon | Nominated | |
| 2019 | Spider-Man: Far from Home | Choice Summer Movie Actress | Won | |

=== World Music Awards ===
The World Music Awards is an international award show based in Monte Carlo and presented to the world's best-selling artists in a number of categories.

| Year | Nominated work | Category | Result | Ref. |
|---|---|---|---|---|
| 2014 | "Replay" | World's Best Song | Nominated | |
| 2014 | "Replay" | World's Best Video | Nominated | |
| 2014 | Zendaya | World's Best Female Artist | Nominated | |

=== Young Artist Awards ===
The Young Artist Award is an accolade presented by the Young Artist Foundation, a nonprofit organization founded in 1978 to honor excellence of youth performers.

| Year | Nominated work | Category | Result | Ref. |
|---|---|---|---|---|
| 2011 | Shake It Up | Outstanding Young Ensemble in a TV Series (Note: Shared with Bella Thorne, Davis Cleveland, Roshon Fegan, Adam Irigoyen, Kenton Duty, and Caroline Sunshine.) | Nominated | |
| 2012 | Shake It Up | Outstanding Leading Young Actress in a TV Series | Nominated | |
| 2012 | Shake It Up | Outstanding Young Ensemble in a TV Series | Nominated | |
| 2013 | Frenemies | Outstanding Leading Young Actress in a TV Movie, Miniseries or Special | Nominated | |

== Critics associations ==
| Year | Nominated work | Association | Category | Result | Ref. |
|---|---|---|---|---|---|
| 2019 | Smallfoot | Alliance of Women Film Journalists | Best Animated Female | Nominated | |
| 2021 | Malcolm & Marie | Hollywood Critics Association (Film Awards) | Best Actress | Nominated | |
| 2021 | Euphoria: "Trouble Don't Last Always" | Hollywood Critics Association (TV Awards) | Best Actress in a Limited Series, Anthology Series, or Television Movie | Nominated | |
| 2022 | Dune | Austin Film Critics Association | Best Ensemble (Note: Shared with the ensemble cast of Dune.) | Nominated | |
| 2022 | Dune | Georgia Film Critics Association | Best Ensemble | Nominated | |
| 2022 | Dune | San Diego Film Critics Society | Best Ensemble | Nominated | |
| 2022 | Euphoria | Hollywood Critics Association (TV Awards) | Best Actress in a Broadcast Network or Cable Series, Drama | Nominated | |
| 2024 | Challengers | Hollywood Creative Alliance (Midseason Awards) | Best Actress | Won | |
| 2024 | Challengers | Florida Film Critics Circle | Best Cast (Note: Shared with the ensemble cast of Challengers.) | Nominated | |
| 2024 | Dune: Part Two | Hollywood Creative Alliance (Film Awards) | Best Cast Ensemble (Note: Shared with the ensemble cast of Dune: Part Two.) | Nominated | |
| 2024 | Dune: Part Two | San Diego Film Critics Society | Best Ensemble | Nominated | |
| 2024 | Dune: Part Two | St. Louis Film Critics Association | Best Ensemble | Nominated | |
| 2025 | Dune: Part Two | Austin Film Critics Association | Best Ensemble | Nominated | |
| 2025 | Dune: Part Two | Georgia Film Critics Association | Best Ensemble | Nominated | |
| 2026 | Euphoria | Hollywood Creative Alliance (TV Awards) | Best Actress in a Drama Series | Nominated | |
| 2026 | Euphoria | Hollywood Creative Alliance (TV Awards) | Best Cable Drama Ensemble (Note: Shared with the ensemble cast of Euphoria.) | Nominated | |
| 2026 | The Drama | Hollywood Creative Alliance (Midseason Awards) | Best Actress | Nominated | |

== Film festivals ==
| Year | Nominated work | Festival | Category | Result | Ref. |
|---|---|---|---|---|---|
| 2021 | Malcolm & Marie | Santa Barbara International Film Festival | Virtuoso Award | Won | |
