= Zendaya discography =

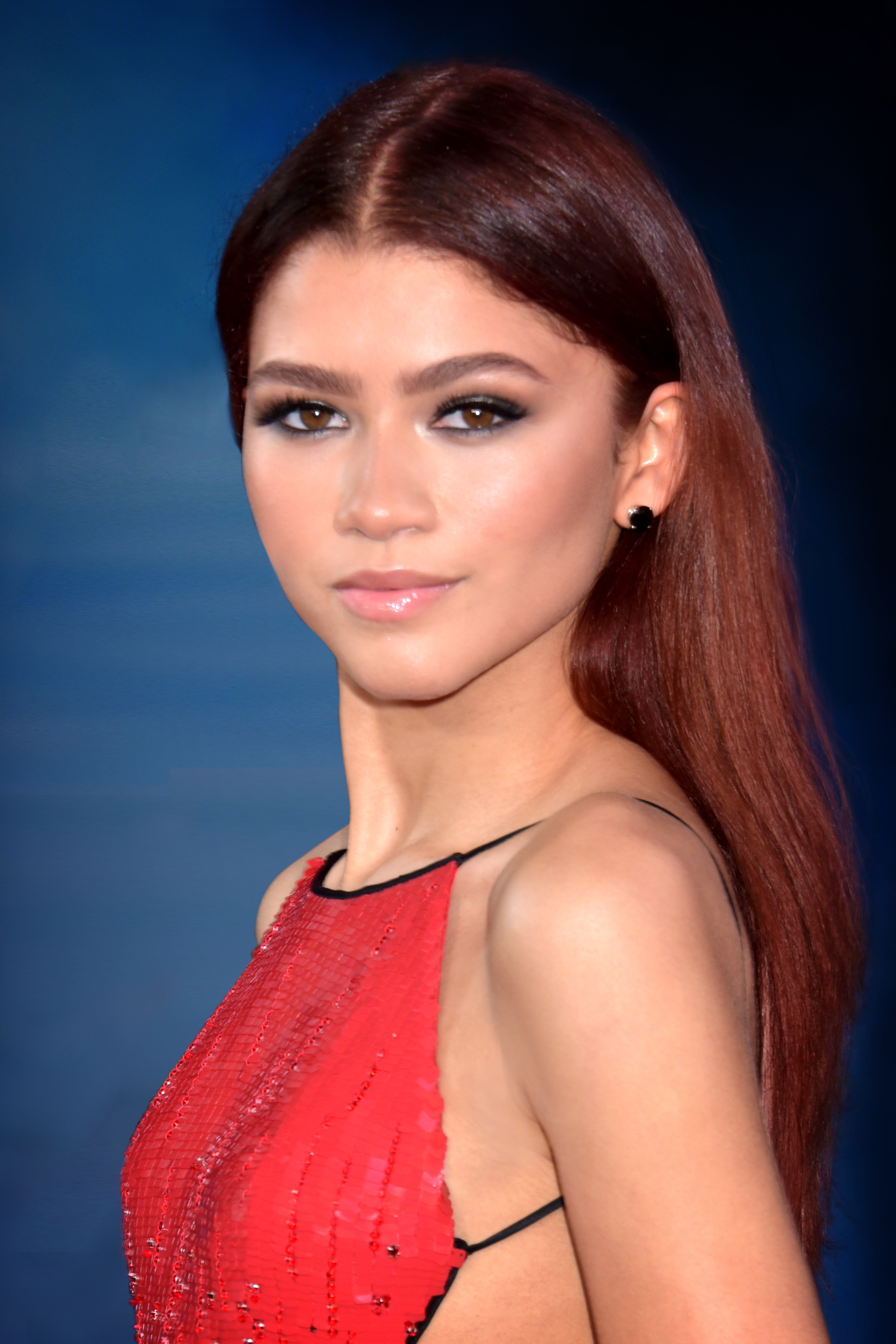
- Zendaya in 2019
- Studio albums: 1
- Extended plays: 1
- Singles: 10
- Promotional singles: 3

American actress and singer Zendaya has released one studio album, 10 singles, three promotional singles, 15 music videos and several album appearances. In 2011, she independently released her debut single, "Swag It Out". Her next single, "Watch Me", peaked at number 86 on the US Billboard Hot 100.

On August 8, 2012, Zendaya signed to Hollywood Records and began writing songs for her debut album. Her debut single, "Replay", was released on July 16, 2013, produced by Mick Schultz and written by Tiffany Fred and Paul "Phamous" Shelton. Her debut album, Zendaya, was released on September 17, 2013, and reached number 51 on the US Billboard 200.

On March 6, 2015, Timbaland confirmed that he would be working with Zendaya on her second album. Speaking on the album, Zendaya told MTV News that the music is a "new wave of R&B. It's where I think it should be going, or it should be headed; it's very old-school vibe, but it's a new age version." In July 2015, Zendaya posted a snippet of a song produced by Timbaland on Instagram. Following this, she appeared on a radio station in Dubai and premiered a longer snippet of the song entitled "Close Up". On November 8, 2015, she posted another video of her lip-syncing to an R&B song which would be included on her then-upcoming album. A music video for the song was released by Hunger TV on November 12, 2015. The single "Something New" featuring Chris Brown was released on February 5, 2016, via Hollywood Records and Republic Records.

== Studio albums ==
List of studio albums, with selected chart positions
| Title | Album details | Peak chart positions |
| Title | Album details | US |
|---|---|---|
| Zendaya | Released: September 17, 2013; Label: Hollywood; Format: CD, LP, digital download, streaming | 51 |

== Extended plays ==
List of extended plays
| Title | EP details |
|---|---|
| Made in Japan (with Bella Thorne) | Released: August 21, 2012; Format: Digital download, streaming; Label: Walt Disney |

== Singles ==
=== As lead artist ===
List of singles, with selected chart positions
| Title | Year | Peak chart positions | | | | | | | | | | Certifications | Album |
| Title | Year | US | US Pop | AUS | CAN | FRA | IRE | NZ | SPA | SWE | UK | Certifications | Album |
|---|---|---|---|---|---|---|---|---|---|---|---|---|---|
| "Watch Me" (with Bella Thorne) | 2011 | 86 | — | — | — | — | — | — | — | — | — | RIAA: Gold | Shake It Up: Break It Down |
| "Something to Dance For" | 2012 | — (Note: "Something to Dance For" did not enter the Billboard Hot 100, but peaked at number 24 on the Bubbling Under Hot 100 chart.) | — | — | — | — | — | — | — | — | — | | Shake It Up: Live 2 Dance |
| "Fashion Is My Kryptonite" (with Bella Thorne) | 2012 | — | — | — | — | — | — | — | — | — | — | | Made in Japan |
| "Contagious Love" (with Bella Thorne) | 2013 | — | — | — | — | — | — | — | — | — | — | | Shake It Up: I Love Dance |
| "Replay" | 2013 | 40 | 20 | 8 | 83 | — | — | 18 | — | — | — | RIAA: 3× Platinum; ARIA: 2× Platinum; RMNZ: Platinum | Zendaya |
| "My Baby" (solo or featuring Ty Dolla Sign, Bobby Brackins and Iamsu!) | 2014 | — | — | — | — | — | — | — | — | — | — | | Zendaya |
| "Something New" (featuring Chris Brown) | 2016 | 93 | 28 | — | — | — | — | — | — | — | — | RMNZ: Gold | Non-album single |
| "Rewrite the Stars" (with Zac Efron) | 2018 | 70 | — | 24 | 71 | 115 | 21 | 32 | 82 | 90 | 16 | RIAA: 3× Platinum; ARIA: 2× Platinum; BPI: 3× Platinum; MC: Gold; PROMUSICAE: Platinum; RMNZ: 3× Platinum | The Greatest Showman |
| "I'm Tired" (with Labrinth) | 2022 | 53 | 34 | 21 | 35 | — | 21 | 16 | — | 40 | 47 | MC: Gold; RIAA: Gold; RMNZ: Gold | Euphoria Season 2 (An HBO Original Series Soundtrack) and Euphoria Season 2 Official Score (From the HBO Original Series) |
| "Elliot's Song" (with Dominic Fike) | 2022 | — (Note: "Elliot's Song" did not enter the Billboard Hot 100, but peaked at number six on the Bubbling Under Hot 100 chart.) | — | 66 | 77 | — | 51 | — | — | 92 | 91 | | Euphoria Season 2 (An HBO Original Series Soundtrack) and Euphoria Season 2 Official Score (From the HBO Original Series) |
"—" denotes releases that did not chart or were not released in that territory.

=== As featured artist ===
List of singles, with selected chart positions
| Title | Year | Peak chart positions | | | | Certifications | Album |
| Title | Year | US Dance | AUS | IRE | UK | Certifications | Album |
|---|---|---|---|---|---|---|---|
| "My Jam" (Bobby Brackins featuring Zendaya and Jeremih) | 2015 | — | — | — | — | | To Live For |
| "This Is for My Girls" (among Artists for Let Girls Learn) | 2016 | 5 | — | — | — | | Non-album single |
| "All for Us" (Labrinth featuring Zendaya) | 2019 | — | 49 | 24 | 52 | RIAA: Gold; RMNZ: Platinum | Imagination & the Misfit Kid |
"—" denotes releases that did not chart or were not released in that territory.

=== Promotional singles ===
List of singles, with selected chart positions
| Title | Year | Peak chart positions | Album |
| Title | Year | US Kid | Album |
|---|---|---|---|
| "Swag It Out" | 2011 | — | Non-album single |
| "Too Much" | 2014 | 1 | Disney Channel Play It Loud |
| "Keep It Undercover" | 2015 | 11 | Non-album single |
| "Wonderful Life" | 2018 | 5 | Smallfoot |
"—" denotes releases that did not chart or were not released in that territory.

== Other charted and certified songs ==
List of songs, with selected chart positions and certifications, showing year released and album name
| Title | Year | Peak chart positions | | | | | | | | Certifications | Album |
| Title | Year | US | US Holiday Dig. | US Kid | US Pop Dig. | AUS | IRE | FRA | UK | Certifications | Album |
|---|---|---|---|---|---|---|---|---|---|---|---|
| "The Same Heart" (with Bella Thorne) | 2012 | — | — | 4 | — | — | — | — | — | | Made in Japan |
| "Made in Japan" (with Bella Thorne) | 2012 | — | — | 3 | — | — | — | — | — | | Made in Japan |
| "Shake Santa Shake" | 2012 | — | 8 | 5 | — | — | — | — | — | | Disney Channel Holiday Playlist |
| "This Is My Dance Floor" (with Bella Thorne) | 2013 | — | — | 2 | — | — | — | — | — | | Shake It Up: I Love Dance |
| "Beat of My Drum" | 2013 | — | — | 8 | — | — | — | — | — | | Shake It Up: I Love Dance |
| "The Greatest Show" (with Hugh Jackman, Keala Settle and Zac Efron) | 2017 | 88 | — | — | 23 | 42 | 34 | 109 | 20 | RIAA: 2× Platinum; ARIA: 2× Platinum; BPI: 2× Platinum | The Greatest Showman |
| "Come Alive" (with Hugh Jackman, Keala Settle and Daniel Everidge) | 2017 | — (Note: "Come Alive" did not enter the Billboard Hot 100, but peaked at number 21 on the Bubbling Under Hot 100 chart.) | — | — | — | — | 70 | — | 55 | BPI: Platinum; RIAA: Gold | The Greatest Showman |
"—" denotes releases that did not chart or were not released in that territory.

== Guest appearances ==
| Title | Year | Other artist(s) | Album |
|---|---|---|---|
| "Dig Down Deeper" | 2011 | —N/a | Disney Fairies: Faith, Trust And Pixie Dust |
| "Something to Dance For / TTYLXOX Mash-Up" | 2012 | Bella Thorne | Shake It Up: Live 2 Dance |
| "I'm Back" | 2013 | —N/a | Shake It Up: I Love Dance |
| "Remember Me" | 2014 | —N/a | Disney Channel Play It Loud |
| "Safe and Sound" | 2014 | Kurt Hugo Schneider, Kina Grannis and MAX | Non-album song |
| "All of Me" | 2014 | Kurt Hugo Schneider and MAX | Piano Acoustic Covers, Vol. 1 |
| "Neverland" | 2015 | —N/a | Finding Neverland: The Album |
| "X" | 2017 | Prince Royce | Five |
| "Wonderful Questions" | 2018 | Channing Tatum | Smallfoot |
| "Rue's I'm Tired" | 2022 | Labrinth | Euphoria Season 2 Official Score (From the HBO Original Series) |
| "The Feels" | 2023 | Labrinth | Ends & Begins |
