= Swag It Out Tour =

2012–14 concert tour by Zendaya

Swag It Out Tour by Crystal
- Tour by Zendaya
- Location: North America
- Associated album: Shake It Up: Break It Down; Zendaya
- Start date: August 5, 2012
- End date: November 1, 2014
- Legs: 3
- No. of shows: 44

Swag It Out Tour (also known as Zendaya: Live in Concert) is the debut concert tour by American actress and recording artist Zendaya. The tour spanned the course of two years, playing music festivals in state fairs in North America.

== Opening acts ==
- Liam Lis (New York City, Freehold Township, Glenside)
- Trevor Jackson (Del Mar, Kennewick, Vancouver, Pomona, Salt Lake City)

== Setlist ==
The following setlist was obtained from the May 2, 2014 concert, held at the Best Buy Theater in New York City, New York. It does not represent all concerts during the tour.

1. "Putcha Body Down"
2. "Heaven Lost an Angel"
3. "Butterflies"
4. "Love You Forever"
5. "Cry for Love"
6. "Only When You're Close"
7. "Fashion Is My Kryptonite" / "Watch Me" / "Something to Dance For"
8. "Scared"
9. "Fireflies"
10. "Bottle You Up"
11. "All of Me"
12. "Smile"
13. "My Baby"
14. "Beat of My Drum"
15. "Replay"

== Tour dates ==
| Date | City | Country | Venue |
North America
Leg 1
| August 5, 2012^{[A]} | Oakland | United States | Frank H. Ogawa Plaza |
| September 22, 2012^{[B]} | St. Louis | United States | Soldiers' Memorial Park |
| October 21, 2012^{[C]} | Los Angeles | United States | Los Angeles Memorial Sports Arena |
| November 3, 2012^{[D]} | Phoenix | United States | Arizona Veterans Memorial Coliseum |
| November 10, 2012 | Cupertino | United States | Flint Center For the Performing Arts |
| November 10, 2012 | San Rafael | United States | Marin Veterans Memorial Auditorium |
| December 27, 2012^{[E]} | Uniondale | United States | Nassau Veterans Memorial Coliseum |
| December 28, 2012^{[E]} | Baltimore | United States | 1st Mariner Arena |
| December 30, 2012^{[E]} | Rochester | United States | Blue Cross Arena |
Leg 2
| June 30, 2013^{[F]} | Joliet | United States | Joliet Memorial Stadium |
| July 5, 2013^{[G]} | San Rafael | United States | Play Fair Pavilion |
| July 6, 2013^{[H]} | Pleasanton | United States | Safeway Amphitheater |
| July 14, 2013^{[I]} | Saratoga Springs | United States | Saratoga Race Course |
| July 27, 2013^{[J]} | Sacramento | United States | Golden 1 Credit Union Concert Stage |
| August 24, 2013^{[K]} | Geddes | United States | Chevy Court |
| August 25, 2013^{[L]} | Toronto | Canada | Molson Canadian Amphitheatre |
| September 20, 2013^{[M]} | Bakersfield | United States | Budweiser Pavilion |
| September 21, 2013^{[N]} | Pomona | United States | Fairplex Park Budweiser Grandstand |
| October 1, 2013^{[O]} | Tulsa | United States | Oklahoma Stage |
| October 12, 2013^{[P]} | Fresno | United States | Paul Paul Theater |
| October 25, 2013^{[D]} | Phoenix | United States | Arizona Veterans Memorial Coliseum |
| December 3, 2013^{[Q]} | San Jose | United States | SAP Center |
| December 7, 2013^{[R]} | National City | United States | Westfield Plaza Bonita |
| December 16, 2013 | Lake Buena Vista | United States | House of Blues |
| December 17, 2013^{[S]} | Los Angeles | United States | 5 Towers Stage |
| December 19, 2013 | Houston | United States | House of Blues |
Leg 3
| May 2, 2014 | New York City | United States | Best Buy Theater |
| May 3, 2014 | Freehold Township | United States | iPlay America Event Center |
| May 4, 2014 | Glenside | United States | Keswick Theatre |
| May 16, 2014 | Beaumont | United States | Beaumont Civic Center |
| May 17, 2014 | Pharr | United States | Pharr Events Center |
| May 31, 2014^{[T]} | Hot Springs | United States | Timberwood Amphitheater |
| June 7, 2014^{[U]} | Denver | United States | Elitch Arena |
| June 14, 2014^{[V]} | Oklahoma City | United States | Starlight Amphitheater |
| June 18, 2014^{[W]} | Del Mar | United States | Heineken Grandstand Stage |
| August 8, 2014^{[X]} | Arlington | United States | Music Mill Amphitheatre |
| August 9, 2014^{[Y]} | Austell | United States | Peachtree Square |
| August 23, 2014^{[Z]} | Kennewick | United States | Hayden Homes Stage |
| August 24, 2014^{[AA]} | Vancouver | Canada | Westjet Concert Stage |
| August 29, 2014^{[N]} | Pomona | United States | Fairplex Park Budweiser Grandstand |
| August 30, 2014^{[AB]} | San Antonio | United States | Lila Cockrell Theatre |
| September 13 2014^{[AC]} | Salt Lake City | United States | Utah State Fair Grandstand |
| October 30, 2014 | Albany | United States | Palace Theatre |
| November 1, 2014 | Uncasville | United States | Mohegan Sun Arena |

Festivals and other miscellaneous performances

^{A} This concert was a part of "Art and Soul Oakland"
^{B} This concert was a part of "Believe in Girls Day"
^{C} This concert was a part of "Who Came To Party With Operation Smile?"
^{D} This concert was a part of the "Arizona State Fair"
^{E} This concert was a part of the "Teen Music Fest"
^{F} This concert was a part of the "Taste of Joliet"
^{G} This concert was a part of the "Marin County Fair"
^{H} This concert was a part of the "Alameda County Fair"
^{I} This concert was a part of "Open House"
^{J} This concert was a part of the "Toyota Concert Series"
^{K} This concert was a part of the "Great New York State Fair"
^{L} This concert was a part of the "Big Ticket Summer Concert"
^{M} This concert was a part of the "Kern County Fair"
^{N} This concert was a part of the "End of Summer Concert Series"
^{O} This concert was a part of the "Tulsa State Fair"
^{P} This concert was a part of the "Table Mountain Concert Series"
^{Q} This concert was a part of the "Triple Ho Show"
^{R} This concert was a part of the "FREECEMBER Toy Drive & Concert"
^{S} This concert was a part of "Toys for Teens"
^{T} This concert was a part of the "Magic Springs 2014 Concert Series"
^{U} This concert was a part of "Elitch Gardens Summer Concert Series"
^{V} This concert was a part of "Frontier City Summer Concert Series"
^{W} This concert was a part of the "Toyota Summer Concert Series"
^{X} This concert was a part of the "Six Flags Summer Concert Series"
^{Y} This concert was a part of "Runaround: A Pop Experience"
^{Z} This concert was a part of the "Benton Franklin Fair & Rodeo"
^{AA} This concert was a part of the "Summer Night Concerts"
^{AB} This concert was a part of the "Chicas Poderosas Concert"
^{AC} This concert was a part of the "Utah State Fair"

Cancellations and rescheduled shows

| November 17, 2012 | Chicago, Illinois | UIC Pavilion | Cancelled. This concert was a part of the "Teen Music Fest" |
| November 23, 2012 | Newark, New Jersey | Prudential Center | Cancelled. This concert was a part of the "Teen Music Fest" |
| November 24, 2012 | Baltimore, Maryland | 1st Mariner Arena | Rescheduled to December 28, 2012 |
| November 25, 2012 | Uniondale, New York | Nassau Veterans Memorial Coliseum | Rescheduled to December 27, 2012 |
| November 27, 2012 | Rochester, New York | Blue Cross Arena | Rescheduled to December 30, 2012 |
| July 16, 2014 | Turlock, California | Bud Light Veriety Free Stage | Cancelled. This concert was a part of the "Stanislaus County Fair" |
| July 18, 2014 | Costa Mesa, California | Pacific Amphitheatre | Cancelled. This concert was a part of the "Orange County Fair" |
| July 19, 2014 | Palmdale, California | Palmdale Amphitheater | Cancelled |
| July 21, 2014 | Harrington, Delaware | M&T Bank Grandstand | Cancelled. This concert was a part of the "Delaware State Fair" |
| August 1, 2014 | Columbus, Ohio | Celeste Center | Cancelled. This concert was a part of the "Ohio State Fair" |
| August 2, 2014 | West Allis, Wisconsin | State Fair Main Stage | Cancelled. This concert was a part of the "Wisconsin State Fair" |

=== Box office score data ===
| Venue | City | Tickets sold / Available | Gross revenue |
|---|---|---|---|
| Best Buy Theater | New York City | 1,581 / 2,150 (73%) | $45,716 |
| iPlay America Event Center | Freehold Township | 1,915 / 1,915 (100%) | $63,205 |
| Mohegan Sun Arena | Uncasville | 4,270 / 6,211 (69%) | $127,905 |

== Personnel ==
Band

- Keyboards: Dylan Wiggins
- Bass guitar: Jaden Wiggins
- Percussion: Ali Khan
- Drums: Jared Anderson
- Guitar: Cole Berliner
- Backing vocalist: Whitney Boswell, Sabrina Chaco and Vivian Allen
- Dancers: Richard Curtis IV, Jake Deanda, Brenna Mendoza, Deja Carter, Dominique Battiste
