= Art and Soul Oakland =

Summer festival in California

Art + Soul Oakland is an annual summer art and music festival held in downtown Oakland, California, first held in 2001. It is held in and around Frank Ogawa Plaza. Past performers have included Zendaya, Lisa Loeb, Leela James, Vintage Trouble, Con Funk Shun, Tristan Prettyman, Pacific Mambo Orchestra, San Francisco-based Luce, Lyrics Born, Meshell Ndegeocello, Souls of Mischief, and Los Rakas.

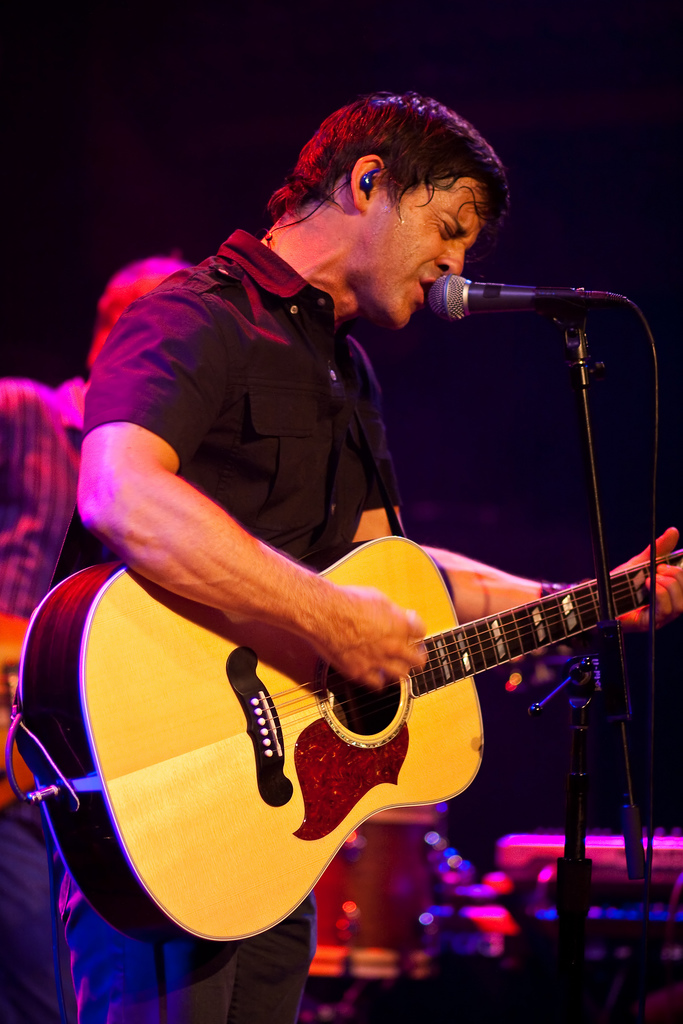
Tom Luce of Luce, playing in San Francisco
