= Frank H. Ogawa =

American politician

Member of the Oakland City Council for the 7th district
- In office April 1, 1966 – July 13, 1994
- Succeeded by: Henry Chang Jr.

Member of the Oakland Park Commission
- In office 1961 – April 1, 1966

Member of the San Francisco Bay Conservation and Development Commission
- In office 1972–1988

Member of the Bay Area Air Quality Management District Board of Directors
- In office January 1979 – December 1992

Personal details
- Born: Hirao Ogawa; May 17, 1917 Lodi, California
- Died: July 13, 1994 (aged 77) Oakland, California
- Spouse: Grace Ogawa (née Hiruma)
- Children: Alan and Nancy
- Occupation: Nursery operator

Frank Hirao Ogawa (Japanese: 小川 平男, May 17, 1917 – July 13, 1994) was a civil rights leader and the first Japanese American to serve on the Oakland City Council, of which he was a member from 1966 until his death in 1994.

== Early life ==
A Nisei, Ogawa was born in Lodi, California and never lived in Japan. Nevertheless, as Japanese Americans, Ogawa and his family members were involuntarily relocated by the U.S. government to the Topaz War Relocation Center in Millard County, Utah following the signing of Executive Order 9066; they were detained there for the duration of World War II. Ogawa married Grace Ogawa (née Hiruma) prior to their wartime detention and they had two children, Alan and Nancy. Nancy was born in the Topaz War Relocation Center but died at age 2.

After the war, Ogawa returned to Oakland where he found work as a gardener. Eventually, he borrowed and saved enough money to open his own nursery.

== Career ==
In 1966, Ogawa became the first Japanese American to serve on the Oakland City Council, of which he was a member until his death in 1994.

Ogawa was a member of the San Francisco Bay Conservation and Development Commission (BCDC) from 1972 to 1988, having been appointed to the commission by the Association of Bay Area Governments.

Ogawa served on the Bay Area Air Quality Management District Board of Directors from 1979 until 1992 when he had to retire from the Board because of health issues. He served as chairman of the board during most of 1987 and served as chair and Vice-Chair of the Board's Executive Committee and Personnel Committee.

Ogawa was a Republican. However, he never held nor was he ever a candidate for any partisan office.

As a public official, Ogawa was known as kind, optimistic, and adept at building consensus.

In about December 1988, Ogawa underwent successful heart surgery.

== Death ==
Ogawa died in Oakland on July 13, 1994, of lung cancer. He was survived by his wife Grace and son Alan, and by two grandchildren, Courtney and Matthew.

More than 600 people, including a representative of Oakland's sister city of Fukuoka, Japan, attended Ogawa's memorial service.

When Ogawa died, Congresswoman Anna Eshoo, in her Tribute to Frank H. Ogawa, said:

"Frank Ogawa was a remarkable person because he could take personal misfortune and turn it into a positive learning experience for himself and others. When Frank and Grace Ogawa were forced to sell their belongings and live in internment camps during World War II, they had to sleep on straw mattresses in horse stalls for six months before being shipped to a camp in Utah to spend another 3 1/2 years in confinement. Despite this mistreatment and injustice, he never lost faith in the United States. Just the opposite--he strived to prove his loyalty to his country and became an internationally recognized champion of Asian-Americans in the process."

She went on to say

"Having served five years on the Oakland Parks Commission, Frank Ogawa was elected to the city council in 1966, making him the first Japanese-American to hold a council seat in a major city in the continental United States. He held that position for 28 years until his passing -- the longest tenure in Oakland's history."

== Legacy ==
Upon his death, the Oakland City Council voted unanimously to rename City Hall Plaza in his honor as Frank H. Ogawa Plaza. The Plaza displays a Bronze Bust of Ogawa.

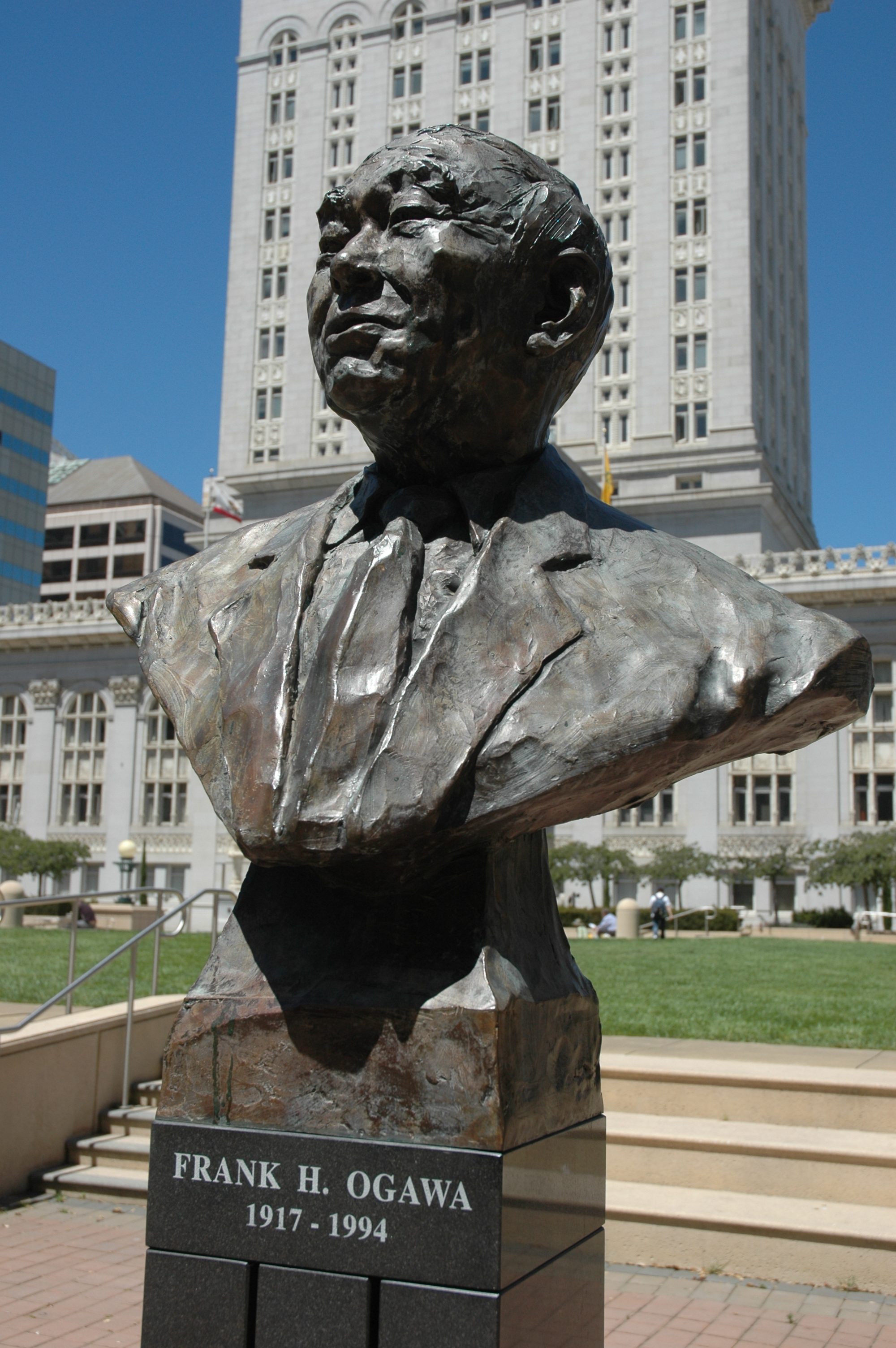
Frank H. Ogawa bust in the former City Hall Plaza (now named for him), Oakland, CA
