= Zendaya =

American actress and singer (born 1996)

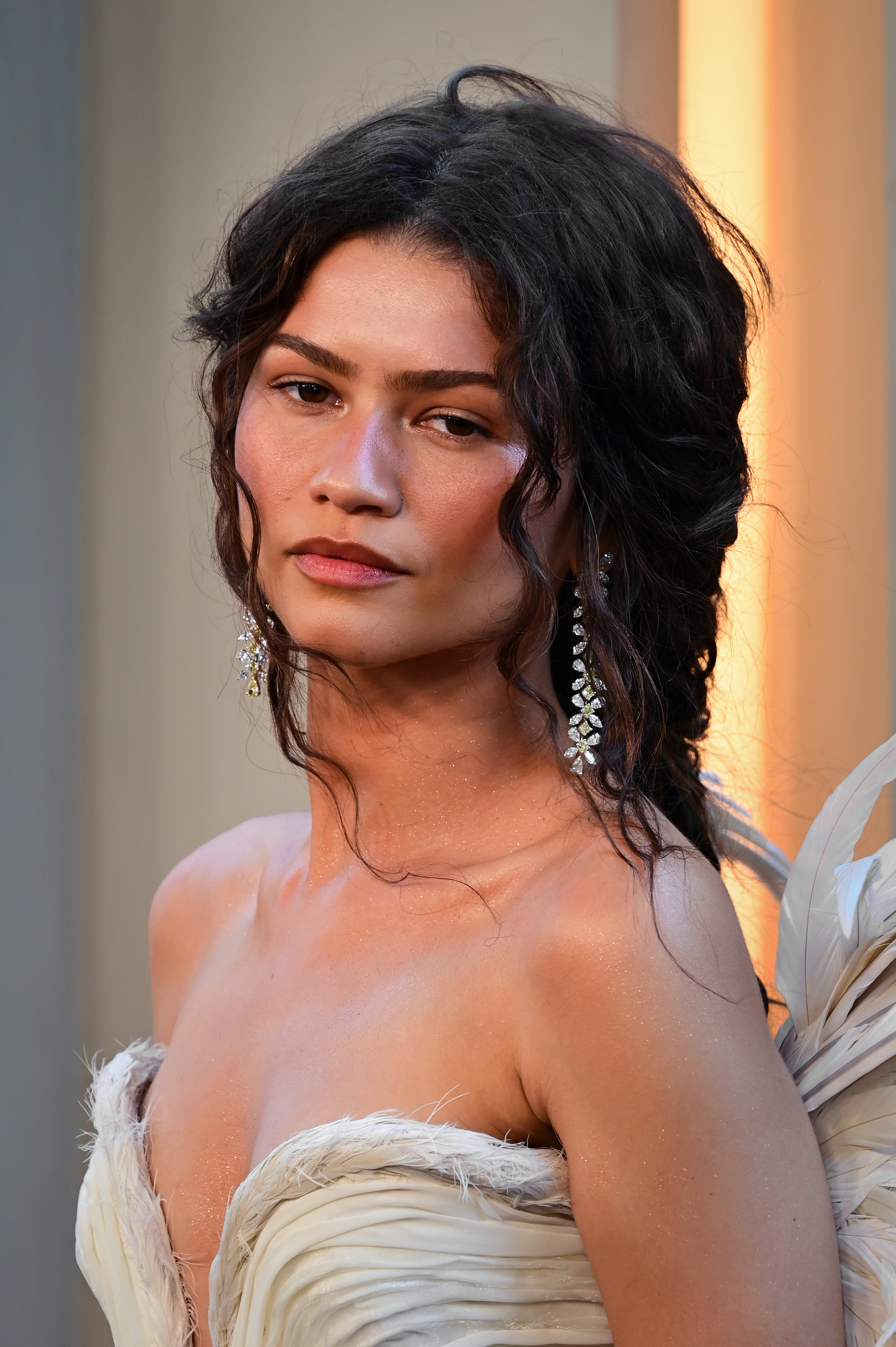
- Zendaya in 2026
- Born: Zendaya Maree Stoermer Coleman; September 1, 1996 (age 30); Oakland, California, U.S.
- Occupations: Actress; singer
- Years active: 2004–present
- Spouse: Tom Holland (m. 2026)
- Awards: Full list
- Musical career
- Instrument: Vocals
- Labels: Hollywood; Republic
- Website: zendaya.com

Zendaya Maree Stoermer Coleman (Note: Pronunciation: /zɛnˈdeɪ.ə/ zen-DAY-ə) (born September 1, 1996) is an American actress and singer. (Note: Attributed to multiple references:) Known for her work in television, blockbuster films, and advertising, her accolades include two Primetime Emmy Awards and a Golden Globe Award. She has been featured on Forbes' 30 under 30 list and was named one of the 100 most influential people in the world in 2022 by Time. Zendaya's films as a leading actress have grossed over $9.8 billion worldwide.

Born in Oakland, California, Zendaya began her career as a child model and dancer before gaining prominence for her roles on the Disney Channel sitcoms Shake It Up (2010–2013) and K.C. Undercover (2015–2018), the latter of which she also produced. For her performance as the drug-addicted teenager Rue Bennett in the HBO drama series Euphoria (2019–2026), Zendaya was nominated for three Primetime Emmy Awards for Outstanding Lead Actress in a Drama Series and won two, becoming the youngest performer to win the award.

Zendaya made her feature film debut as Michelle Jones-Watson in the Marvel Cinematic Universe film Spider-Man: Homecoming (2017). She reprised the role in the film's sequels Far From Home (2019), No Way Home (2021), and Brand New Day (2026). She also starred in the musical film The Greatest Showman (2017), Denis Villeneuve's Dune trilogy (2021–2026), and The Odyssey (2026), and has earned praise for her performances in the romance films Malcolm & Marie (2021), Challengers (2024) and The Drama (2026).

As a singer, Zendaya released her self-titled debut album with Hollywood Records in 2013. Its lead single, "Replay", peaked in the top 40 of the US Billboard Hot 100 and earned multi-platinum certifications. "Rewrite the Stars", her duet with Zac Efron from the 2017 soundtrack for The Greatest Showman, charted in the top 20 and achieved multi-platinum status in various countries. Outside of acting and music, Zendaya wrote the 2013 book Between U and Me: How to Rock Your Tween Years with Style and Confidence, and in 2021 she became the youngest person to win the CFDA Fashion Icon award at the CFDA Fashion Awards.

== Early life ==
Zendaya was born in Oakland, California. Her name derives from the Shona name Tendai (meaning 'to give thanks'). Both of her parents were working as teachers at the time of her birth. Her father, Kazembe Ajamu Coleman, is a black American with Nigerian ancestry. Her mother, Claire Stoermer, has German and Scottish ancestry. Zendaya has six older half-siblings from her father's previous relationships: Latonja, Austin, Julien, Kaylee, Katianna and AnnaBella. Zendaya's parents divorced in 2016.

Zendaya attended Fruitvale Elementary School in Oakland, where her mother taught. She was described as energetic and outgoing at home but reserved and shy at school. At the end of her first school year, her parents had her repeat kindergarten to help build her confidence. Because of her father's passion for basketball, Zendaya's parents enrolled her in a local basketball team. After losing interest in the sport, she switched to soccer and track, but lost interest in those sports, too. At age six, Zendaya and two of her friends—the only three Black children at the school—convinced the principal to let them perform a play for Black History Month.

== Career ==
=== 2004–2009: Beginnings ===
At age eight, Zendaya joined Future Shock Oakland, a hip-hop dance group with which she performed for three years. She also spent two years dancing hula with the Academy of Hawaiian Arts. After deciding to pursue acting, Zendaya assisted her mother, who spent the summer working as a house manager at the California Shakespeare Theater. There, she assisted patrons with their seats and sold fundraising tickets, but her primary interest was in the performances. Her first acting role was as a silkworm in her school's production of James and the Giant Peach. At age eleven, she began attending Oakland School for the Arts and was cast in several roles in local theaters. Zendaya portrayed Little Ti Moune in Once on This Island at the Berkeley Playhouse. She played Joe—a role originally written for a male performer—at TheaterWorks' Palo Alto production of Caroline, or Change.

By the sixth grade, Zendaya had played Lady Anne in Richard III and Celia in As You Like It and had participated in a production of Twelfth Night. When she was in seventh grade, she and her father moved to a small apartment in downtown Los Angeles, while her mother remained in Oakland. She later reflected that her father was highly attuned to her ambitions, and she "missed a lot of fun things" while pursuing her dreams. In 2015, Zendaya graduated from Oak Park High School of Ventura County.

=== 2009–2016: Disney Channel ===
Zendaya began her career working as a fashion model for Macy's, Old Navy, and the department store Mervyn's. She also appeared as a backup dancer in a Sears commercial with Disney star Selena Gomez. In 2009, Zendaya was a featured performer in the video for the Kidz Bop cover of Katy Perry's song "Hot n Cold". The same year, Zendaya was among 200 girls who auditioned for the Disney Channel sitcom Shake It Up, which follows two teenage friends who get their big break on the local dance show Shake It Up Chicago. She originally auditioned for the role of CeCe Jones, which ultimately went to her co-star Bella Thorne; Zendaya was cast as Rocky Blue. Disney Channel senior vice president Judy Taylor said Zendaya had a "great presence" and was "completely engaging".

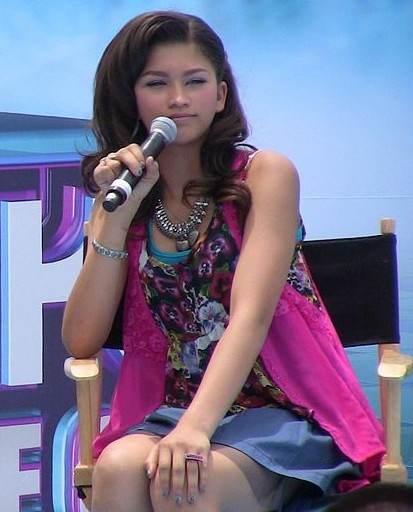
Zendaya hosting the Make Your Mark: Ultimate Dance Off event in 2011

The first season of Shake It Up premiered on November 7, 2010, was watched by 6.2 million viewers, and was the Disney Channel's second highest-rated premiere ever. In 2011, Zendaya released "Swag It Out", a promotional independent single, and starred in the book trailer for From Bad To Cursed by Katie Alender. The same year, Zendaya released the single "Watch Me" with Thorne, which peaked at number 86 on the US Billboard Hot 100 chart. It was also in 2011 that Target stores launched a clothing line inspired by the outfits worn by Zendaya and other Shake It Up cast members. The second season of Shake It Up premiered in September 2011. Zendaya made her film debut as an aspiring magazine editor in Frenemies (2012), a Disney Channel Original Movie. In March 2012, Zendaya's "Something to Dance For" was released as a promotional single for the soundtrack of the second season of Shake It Up.

In October 2012, Shake It Up's third and final season premiered. That year, Zendaya signed with Hollywood Records. She was later announced as one of the celebrity contestants on the 16th season of Dancing with the Stars. At age sixteen, she became the youngest contestant in the show's history at the time. She and her dance partner, the professional dancer Valentin Chmerkovskiy, finished as runners-up to Kellie Pickler and Derek Hough. Zendaya released her debut studio album, Zendaya, on September 17, 2013. The pop and R&B album explores love and heartbreak, and peaked at number 51 on the US Billboard 200. It was preceded by its lead single, "Replay", which peaked at number 40 on the Billboard Hot 100. She auditioned several times for the 2015 Disney Channel film Descendants, but did not get a role.

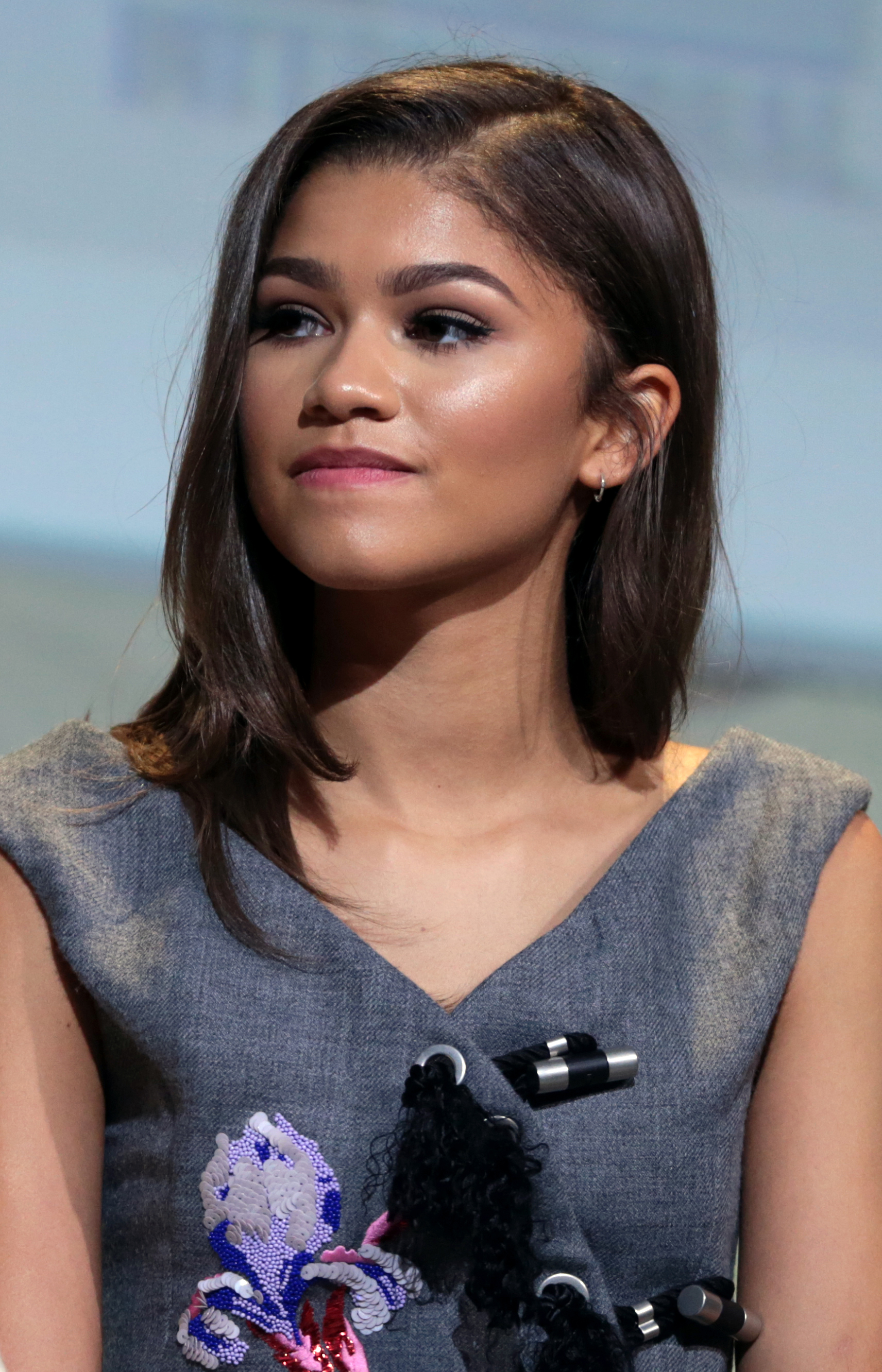
Zendaya at San Diego Comic-Con in 2016

In 2014, Zendaya starred in the Disney Channel film Zapped as a high school student whose cell phone gains the power to control the boys around her. She was then cast as the lead in a Disney Channel pilot, Super Awesome Katy. She was unhappy with the name of her character and the name of the series, and lobbied for them to be changed. Ultimately, the character's name was changed from Katy Cooper to K.C. Cooper, and the show was retitled K.C. Undercover. Disney made the 16-year-old Zendaya a producer on the show after she insisted on it. The studio also agreed to Zendaya's demands that the series depict a family of color, and that K.C. not be talented at acting, dancing or singing, or be otherwise artistically inclined, to show audiences that there are "other things that a girl can be." K.C. Undercover premiered in January 2015. In 2016, in the middle of its second season, the series had 160 million total viewers across all Disney platforms. Common Sense Media called the series "tepid" but said that Zendaya "rescues" it.

In 2014, Zendaya appeared as a guest judge on an episode of Project Runway: Under the Gunn in which contestants were challenged to design an outfit for her to wear at an upcoming concert performance. In March 2015, musician Timbaland confirmed that he was collaborating with Zendaya on her second album, after her move from Disney's label to Republic Records. The following year, she released the single "Something New" featuring Chris Brown, through Hollywood Records and Republic Records. In December 2016, Zendaya appeared as a guest judge in the season finale of Project Runway's 15th season.

=== 2017–2021: Mature roles and breakthrough ===
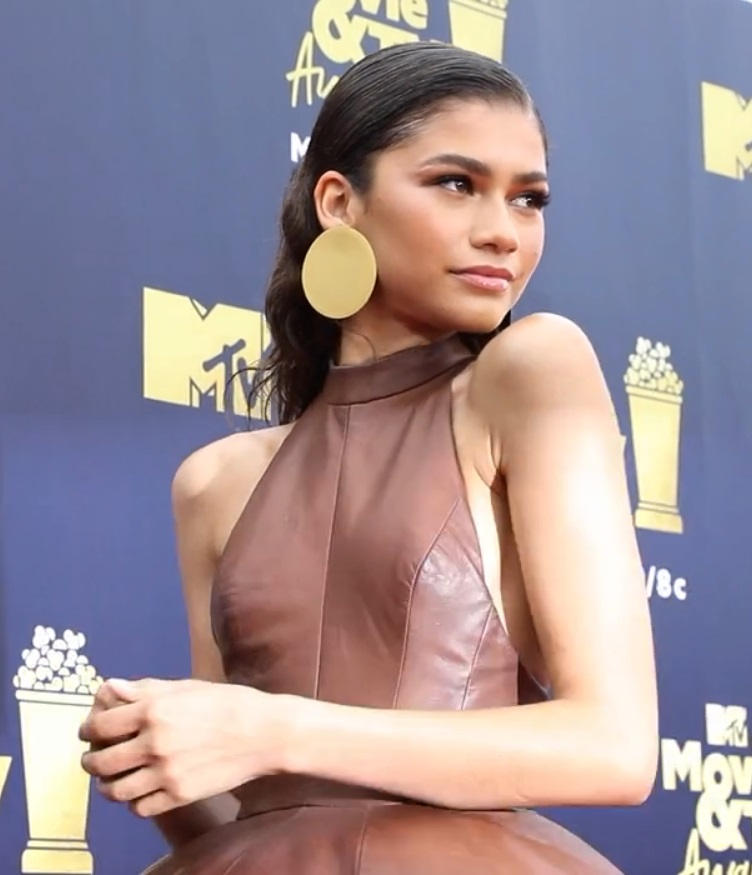
Zendaya at the 2018 MTV Movie & TV Awards in Santa Monica, California

In 2017, Zendaya appeared in the music video for Bruno Mars's song "Versace on the Floor" and made her feature film debut in the Marvel Cinematic Universe film Spider-Man: Homecoming as Michelle "MJ" Jones-Watson. She wore no makeup and regular clothes to her screen test; producers Kevin Feige and Amy Pascal did not recognize her despite her fame. Zendaya described Michelle as awkward, intellectual, and "very dry". She found it refreshing to play a character who was "weird" and "different", and believed that many young people—and especially young women—could relate to Michelle. Zendaya added her own embellishments to the character, including carrying around a mug of "strange" herbal tea.

Spider-Man: Homecoming grossed over $880 million worldwide, making it the sixth-highest-grossing film of 2017. Critics at The Hollywood Reporter and The Guardian praised Zendaya as a "scene stealer", while Stephanie Zacharek of Time lauded her "delightfully sullen insouciance". Zendaya then starred in the musical film The Greatest Showman (2017), portraying a trapeze artist who falls in love with a white man (Zac Efron) during a time when interracial relationships were socially taboo. Owen Gleiberman of Variety praised her on-screen chemistry with Efron, while David Rooney of The Hollywood Reporter said she brought "touching sensitivity" to her role. Zendaya appeared on three songs from the film's soundtrack, including "Rewrite the Stars" and "The Greatest Show", which reached numbers 70 and 88 respectively on Billboard Hot 100.

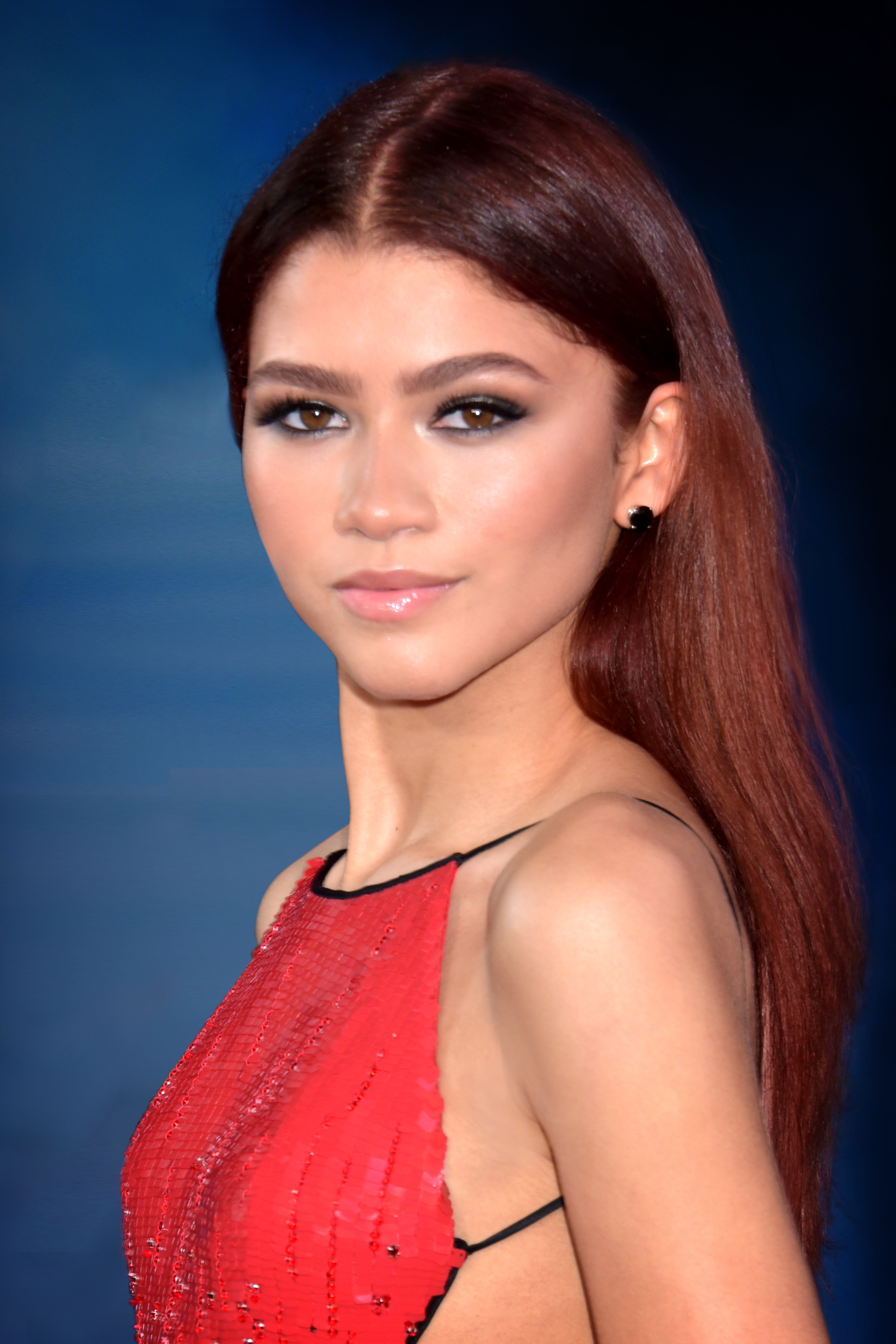
Zendaya at the premiere of Spider-Man: Far From Home in Hollywood, California in 2019

In September 2018, Zendaya voiced the yeti Meechee in the Warner Animation Group film Smallfoot, which received positive reviews from critics. In 2019, she began starring in the HBO drama series Euphoria, an adaptation of the Israeli show Euphoria. She plays Rue Bennett, a 17-year-old drug addict who also narrates the series. Rebecca Nicholson of The Guardian said Zendaya defied expectations about her acting abilities by giving a "truly astonishing, mesmerising performance" as the "self-destructive, self-loathing Rue". Doreen St. Félix of The New Yorker wrote that "it becomes difficult, and then absolutely silly, to recall the pink outlines of her early career on the Disney Channel, so grandly does she inhabit this dark new role".

The same year, she reprised her role as MJ in Spider-Man: Far From Home. Critic Christy Lemire called her performance "darkly alluring" and praised her "humorous, deadpan charm", while Todd McCarthy of The Hollywood Reporter described her as "appealing" and funny. The film grossed over $1.1 billion worldwide, ranking as the fourth highest-grossing release of 2019. In 2020, Zendaya won the Primetime Emmy Award for Outstanding Lead Actress in a Drama Series for her performance in Euphoria, becoming the youngest recipient of the award at 24 years old. In 2021, she starred in and produced Sam Levinson's Malcolm & Marie, filmed during the early months of the COVID-19 pandemic under strict safety protocols and with a minimal crew. The film received mixed reviews, with Richard Brody of The New Yorker calling Zendaya "the movie's only redeeming quality".

Zendaya next voiced Lola Bunny in Space Jam: A New Legacy (2021). She accepted the role after Ryan Coogler approached her, citing both her admiration for him and her fondness for the original 1996 film. She also drew inspiration from her family's love of basketball for her performance. The same year, she portrayed Chani in Denis Villeneuve's science fiction epic Dune, the first installment of a three-part adaptation of the 1965 novel. Glenn Kenny of RogerEbert.com called her performance "better than apt". Zendaya then reprised her role as MJ in Spider-Man: No Way Home; critic Brian Tallerico of RogerEbert.com praised her chemistry with Tom Holland and her handling of MJ's "emotional final beats".

=== 2022–present: Established actress ===
Zendaya started 2022 with the release of Euphoria's second season. Having previously collaborated with Labrinth on the single "All for Us" for the first season, she co-wrote two more songs, "I'm Tired" and "Elliot's Song", also singing on "I'm Tired". For her acting performance, she earned four Emmy nominations at the 74th Primetime Emmy Awards. She became the youngest person in Emmy history to be nominated twice for Outstanding Lead Actress in a Drama Series, and her nomination as an executive producer for Outstanding Drama Series made her the youngest woman ever nominated in the category. By winning the lead actress award, she also became the youngest person to win two Emmys. Zendaya next appeared in Elvis Mitchell's documentary Is That Black Enough for You?!? (2022).

At the 80th Golden Globe Awards in January 2023, Zendaya won the Golden Globe Award for Best Actress – Television Series Drama for her performance in Euphoria, and received a Screen Actors Guild Award nomination the next month. During the second weekend of Coachella in April 2023, she joined Labrinth for a surprise performance of "All for Us" and "I'm Tired", which was her first live performance in eight years. She was also featured on "The Feels", the opening track of Labrinth's third studio album Ends & Begins. Zendaya next appeared in the documentary Invisible Beauty (2023) which focuses on the life and work of American model and activist Bethann Hardison.

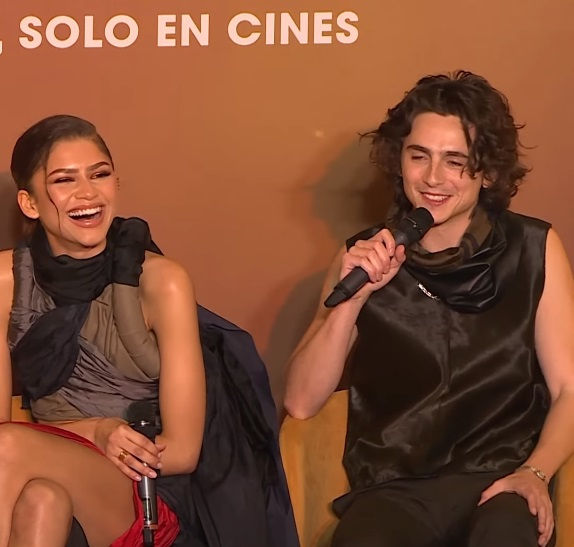
Zendaya and co-star Timothée Chalamet promoting Dune: Part Two in 2024

In 2024, Zendaya reprised her role as Chani in Dune: Part Two. During filming in the Jordan desert, she experienced heatstroke because she did not drink enough water. Alison Willmore of Vulture praised her "fierce, open-hearted performance", while Austen Goslin of Polygon lauded her "economical" acting, deeming it a career best. She next starred in and produced Challengers (2024), directed by Luca Guadagnino. In the film, she plays a former tennis prodigy who suffered a career-ending injury and became a coach. She characterized the role as an opportunity to abandon her youthful image and portray a character closer to her own age. Hans Simran of the New Statesman called the film "a brilliant showcase for Zendaya, whose on-screen magnetism has rarely been channelled so effectively". For her performance, Zendaya was nominated for the Golden Globe Award for Best Actress in a Motion Picture – Musical or Comedy at the 82nd Golden Globes.

In 2026, Zendaya reprised her role as Rue in the third and final season of Euphoria and starred opposite Robert Pattinson in the romantic drama The Drama. She also appeared as the goddess Athena in Christopher Nolan's The Odyssey and as MJ in Spider-Man: Brand New Day. After finding MJ to be too "normal" in an early draft of the Brand New Day screenplay, Zendaya worked with the writers to give MJ more quirks. The total combined gross of The Drama, The Odyssey and Spider-Man: Brand New Day surpassed $4 billion worldwide, making Zendaya the highest-grossing actor of 2026. (Note: Attributed to multiple references:)

==== Upcoming ====
Zendaya reprises her role as Chani in Dune: Part Three, releasing in December 2026. She will voice Shrek and Fiona's daughter Felicia in Shrek 5, scheduled for release in 2027.

In 2025, it was confirmed that Zendaya will star as Ronnie Spector, the frontwoman of the American girl group the Ronettes, in Be My Baby, a biopic based on Spector's 1990 memoir. Before Spector's death in 2022, she chose Zendaya for the role. Zendaya will also serve as a producer on the project, with Barry Jenkins as director; the two previously collaborated on an advertising campaign for Prada in 2026. Zendaya said she wants the film to be "more experimental" than a traditional biopic.

== Fashion and media image ==
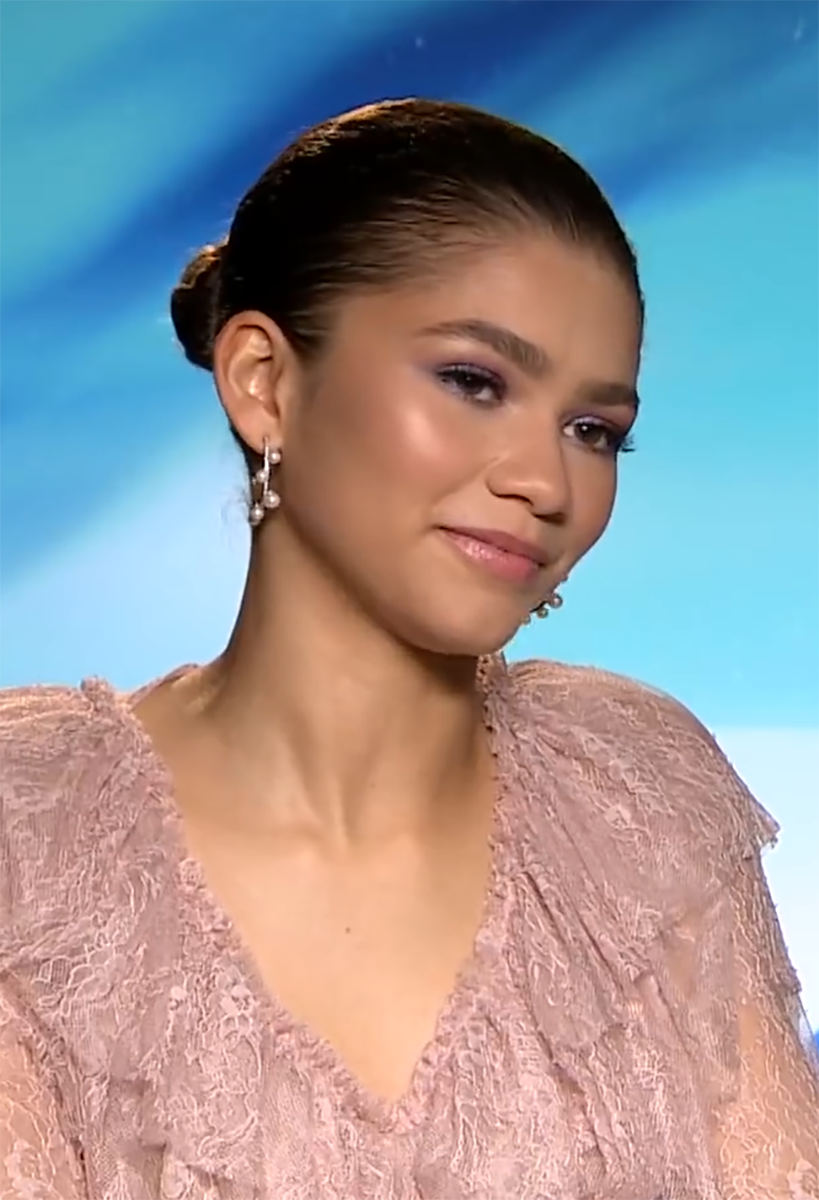
Zendaya promoting Smallfoot in 2018

Zendaya has been described as a "style star" by the fashion-industry trade journal Women's Wear Daily, and is known for her longtime partnership with stylist Law Roach. She is recognized for her use of method dressing, a promotional fashion practice in which an actor incorporates elements of a film's themes, characters, or aesthetics into their red carpet and press appearances. She began the practice following her work on The Greatest Showman. (Note: Attributed to multiple references:) In 2015, Zendaya launched the Daya shoe collection, and the following year she launched the Daya by Zendaya clothing line. She co-designed capsule collections for Tommy Hilfiger, drawing inspiration from the 1970s and its "strong, iconic women". Her Paris and New York Fashion Week shows were praised for their diversity and inclusivity, as they featured women of color, plus-size models, and models up to seventy years old.

In 2013, Zendaya authored the book Between U and Me: How to Rock Your Tween Years with Style and Confidence, in order to "help girls through the tougher parts of the tween years". In 2016, she was featured on Forbes' 30 under 30 list, and in 2018 she was ranked as one of the best-dressed women by the fashion website Net-a-Porter. For the September 2020 issue of InStyle, she and Roach used all Black designers, artists, and creatives for Zendaya's cover photoshoot. The same year, Zendaya won the Visionary Award at the CNMI Green Carpet Fashion Awards for "promoting diversity and inclusion in fashion and film". In 2021, she became the youngest person to win the CFDA Fashion Icon award at the CFDA Fashion Awards. In 2022, she was included on Time's annual list of the 100 most influential people in the world and on Variety's list of the 500 most influential figures in global media. The same year, Dune director Denis Villeneuve called her "a cultural icon in the making. In November 2026, Variety named Zendaya among the best movie stars of all time, ranking her 98th of 100, with Owen Gleiberman pointin to her breakthrough in The Greatest Showman (2017) and her more eclectic roles in Challengers (2024) and The Drama (2026), while opining that the actress is "rewriting stardom".

Zendaya has promoted the brands Beats Electronics, Bulgari, Chi Hair Care, CoverGirl, Glaceau Smartwater, Lancôme, Louis Vuitton, Material Girl, On, Prada, Rolex, and Valentino. She has modeled for the designers Michael Kors and Dolce & Gabbana. In 2025, various internet memes emerged related to a large Emporio Armani hat Zendaya had worn to the Teen Vogue Young Hollywood Party in 2014.

== Philanthropy and activism ==
Zendaya has supported various charities and causes. In 2012, she performed at a benefit event for Operation Smile and supported Hurricane Sandy relief efforts as an ambassador for the organization Convoy of Hope. In 2014, she recorded a cover version of John Legend's song "All of Me", with a portion of the proceeds going to Convoy of Hope. In 2016, she celebrated her 20th birthday with a campaign to raise $50,000 to support the organization's Women's Empowerment Initiative. She was a spokesperson for UNICEF's Trick-or-Treat campaign in 2014. In July 2015, she visited South Africa with UNAIDS, the United Nations program dedicated to preventing and creating access to treatment for HIV and AIDS. She also held a fundraiser with Crowdrise, with proceeds going to nonprofit, community-based, Ikageng charity in Soweto for a family of AIDS orphans. When Malcolm & Marie, filmed during the pandemic, was sold in September 2020, a portion of the proceeds was shared with Feeding America. In October 2023, she voiced support for Palestine.

Zendaya supports campaigns to raise awareness about underserved communities and underprivileged schools and to financially support schools. In 2017, she became a spokesperson for the Verizon Foundation's #WeNeedMore initiative, which seeks to bring technology and learning opportunities to children. In 2018, she partnered with Google.org to fund a computer science program at an Oakland school.

Zendaya considers herself an intersectional feminist. She took part in the George Floyd protests in June 2020 and temporarily lent her Instagram account to Patrisse Cullors to share anti-racism resources and media. She has been an advocate for voting; in October 2016, she participated in the "Vote Your Future" initiative, and in September 2020, she and her nonpartisan "When We All Vote" organization encouraged fans to check their voter registration ahead of elections. In October 2013, Zendaya took part in P&G's anti-bullying campaign Mean Stinks, co-hosting a nationwide live-streamed assembly with nearly 500 schools. In September 2017, she and her Spider-Man: Homecoming co-stars were featured in a PSA for the awareness campaign Stomp Out Bullying.

== Personal life ==
In November 2021, Zendaya and her Spider-Man co-star Tom Holland confirmed they were in a relationship. (Note: Attributed to multiple references:) Zendaya felt the media attention their relationship received was "weird and confusing and invasive". The couple moved into a £3 million home in London in 2023 and became engaged in December 2024. During the 32nd Actor Awards in March 2026, Zendaya's longtime stylist Law Roach said that Zendaya and Holland had secretly wed. Holland confirmed their marriage during an interview with Esquire UK that June. The couple held a private wedding celebration two months later in Surrey. Zendaya also owns a house in Los Angeles and a condominium in Brooklyn. She is a vegetarian due to her love for animals.

== Filmography ==
Key
†	Denotes films that have not yet been released

=== Film ===
Year	Title	Role	Notes	Ref.
2013	Super Buddies	Lollipop	Voice role; direct-to-video film	
2017	Spider-Man: Homecoming	Michelle "MJ" Jones-Watson		
2017	The Greatest Showman	Anne Wheeler		
2018	Duck Duck Goose	Chi	Voice role	
2018	Smallfoot	Meechee	Voice role	
2019	Spider-Man: Far From Home	Michelle "MJ" Jones-Watson		
2021	Malcolm & Marie	Marie Jones	Also producer	
2021	Space Jam: A New Legacy	Lola Bunny	Voice role	
2021	Dune	Chani		
2021	Spider-Man: No Way Home	Michelle "MJ" Jones-Watson		
2024	Dune: Part Two	Chani		
2024	Challengers	Tashi Duncan	Also producer	
2026	The Drama	Emma Harwood		
2026	The Odyssey	Athena / Trojan priestess		
2026	Spider-Man: Brand New Day	Michelle "MJ" Jones-Watson		
2026	Dune: Part Three †	Chani		
2027	Shrek 5 †	Felicia	Voice role; post-production	

=== Television ===
Year	Title	Role	Notes	Ref.
2010–2013	Shake It Up	Rocky Blue	Co-lead role; 75 episodes	
2011	Good Luck Charlie	Rocky Blue	Episode: "Charlie Shakes It Up"	
2011	PrankStars	Herself	Episode: "Walk the Prank"	
2011	Pixie Hollow Games	Fern (voice)	Television special	
2012	A.N.T. Farm	Sequoia Jones	Episode: "Creative consultANT"	
2012	Frenemies	Halley Brandon	Television film	
2013	Dancing with the Stars	Herself	Contestant (season 16), and runner-up	
2013	The Story of Zendaya	Herself	Documentary series	
2014	Zapped	Zoey Stevens	Television film	
2014	The Making of SWAY	Herself	Television dancing-preparation show; 8 episodes	
2014	SWAY: A Dance Trilogy	Herself	Television dance show	
2015–2018	K.C. Undercover	K.C. Cooper	Lead role; 75 episodes (also co-producer)	
2015	Black-ish	Rasheida	Episode: "Daddy's Day"	
2016	America's Next Top Model	Herself	Episode: "Lights, Camera, Catwalk"	
2017	Walk the Prank	Herself	Episode: "K.C. Undercover Edition"	
2017	Lip Sync Battle	Herself	Episode: "Tom Holland vs. Zendaya"	
2019	The OA	Fola Udaki	Recurring role; 3 episodes (season 2)	
2019–2026	Euphoria	Rue Bennett	Lead role; 26 episodes (also executive producer for specials and season 2)	

=== Web ===
Year	Title	Role	Note	Ref.
2021	Fortnite Winterfest Trailer - Featuring Spider-Man	Michelle "MJ" Jones (voice)		

=== Music videos ===
==== As lead artist ====
Title	Year	Director
"Watch Me" (with Bella Thorne)	2011	Lipo Chang
"Dig Down Deeper"	2011	Unknown
"Swag It Out"	2011	Glenn A. Foster
"Something to Dance For / TTYLXOX Mash-Up"	2012	Sanaa Hamri
"Fashion Is My Kryptonite" (with Bella Thorne)	2012	Marc Klasfeld
"Contagious Love" (with Bella Thorne)	2013	Marc Klasfeld
"Replay"	2013	Colin Tilley
"My Baby"	2014	Stephen Garnett
"My Baby" (Remix)	2014	Stephen Garnett
"Safe and Sound"	2014	—N/a
"All of Me"	2014	—N/a
"Neverland"	2016	Brad Furman

==== As featured artist ====
Title	Year	Main artist(s)	Director(s)
"My Jam"	2015	Bobby Brackins, Jeremih	Damien Sandoval

==== As guest appearance ====
Title	Year	Artist	Director	Ref.
"Hot n Cold"	2009	Kidz Bop Kids	Unknown	
"Like We Grown"	2013	Trevor Jackson	Mike He	
"Bad Blood"	2015	Taylor Swift	Joseph Kahn	
"All Night"	2016	Beyoncé	Beyoncé	
"Versace on the Floor"	2017	Bruno Mars	Cameron Duddy and Bruno Mars	

== Discography ==
- Zendaya (2013)

== Awards and recognition ==
In 2020, at age 24, Zendaya became the youngest recipient of the Primetime Emmy Award for Outstanding Lead Actress in a Drama Series, winning for her role as Rue Bennett in the HBO drama series Euphoria. After winning the award again at the 2022 Primetime Emmy Awards, she became the youngest two-time acting winner. Zendaya received the CinemaCon Star of the Year Award in 2023.

== Concert tours ==
- Swag It Out Tour (2012–2014)

Opening act

- Summer Tour (Bridgit Mendler) (2014)

== See also ==
- List of black Golden Globe Award winners and nominees
- List of Primetime Emmy Award winners
- Mononymous person

== Bibliography ==
- James, Alison (2023). Zendaya. Michael O'Mara Books. ISBN 978-1-78929-551-1.
- Perricone, Kathleen (2025). Zendaya Is Life. Quarto Publishing. ISBN 978-0-7603-9501-1.
