= Malcolm & Marie =

2021 film by Sam Levinson

- Official release poster
- Directed by: Sam Levinson
- Written by: Sam Levinson
- Produced by: Kevin Turen; Ashley Levinson; Sam Levinson; Zendaya; John David Washington; Scott Mescudi
- Starring: Zendaya; John David Washington
- Cinematography: Marcell Rév
- Edited by: Julio C. Perez IV
- Music by: Labrinth
- Production companies: Little Lamb; FotoKem
- Distributed by: Netflix
- Release date: February 5, 2021 (United States)
- Running time: 106 minutes
- Country: United States
- Language: English
- Budget: $2.5 million

Malcolm & Marie is a 2021 American black-and-white romantic drama film written, co-produced and directed by Sam Levinson. The film stars Zendaya and John David Washington (who both also served as producers, alongside American musician Kid Cudi) and follows a writer-director and his girlfriend whose relationship is tested on the night of his latest film's premiere when revelations about themselves surface. The project was the first Hollywood feature to be entirely written, financed, and produced during the COVID-19 lockdowns, with filming taking place in secret in June and July 2020.

Malcolm & Marie received a limited release on January 29, 2021, before being released digitally on February 5, 2021, by Netflix. The film received mixed reviews from critics, with many praising Zendaya and Washington's performances and chemistry and Levinson's direction, but criticizing his screenplay. The film also received some criticism for the twelve-year age difference between the two actors portraying the protagonist characters. For her performance, Zendaya was nominated for Best Actress at the 26th Critics' Choice Awards.

== Plot ==
Writer-director Malcolm Elliott returns home from his film premiere with his girlfriend, Marie Jones. Malcolm eagerly anticipates the critical reviews following the emotional audience response from the screening. When he notices Marie looking displeased, he urges her to tell him what is bothering her. Initially reluctant to start a fight in the middle of the night, she tells him that she is upset that she was not thanked or acknowledged in his speech at the premiere.

Marie believes that she is the basis of his film; a drama about a struggling, black, female drug addict, named Imani, as she herself was a drug addict when they met. Malcolm dismisses her accusations, claiming that Imani is not based on her and is an amalgamation of different people. Marie insists that he would not have authentically portrayed Imani's struggles with drug abuse and addiction if they were not together. Malcolm believes that Marie is overreacting, claiming that, because she quit acting years ago, she is jealous of the actress who played Imani and that she is projecting her personal problems on him and his film. Marie affirms her position on his lack of acknowledgment and calls his talents "mediocre." While Marie is taking a bath, Malcolm describes to her the different women he had relationships with, who inspired the character of Imani, stating that only Imani's feelings of hopelessness were based on Marie. After drying herself from the bath, she responds by playing Dionne Warwick's song "Get Rid of Him" on her phone, while the two are sitting silently outside.

Heading back inside, Malcolm then finds and reads the first critic review posted about his film. Despite the review being positive, he rants about the white female critic's political interpretation of his film as he did not intend it to be political. He laments that film critics are focusing too much on his black male identity and projecting politics into their interpretations, rather than judging him for his own merits. Marie playfully belittles his angry reaction to the positive review and his inability to take criticism, before the two appear to be bonding again following their arguments.

Before the two can begin to have sex, Marie provokes him when she asks why he did not cast her as Imani, believing that she would have brought a vulnerability and authenticity to the character that could have made the film better. After they angrily accuse each other of being egotistical, Marie then brings out a knife and acts out a scene as Imani to demonstrate authenticity, scaring but impressing Malcolm over how convincing she is. The two go to their bedroom and argue once more, until Marie lectures him about him taking her for granted and his lack of acknowledgement of how their genuine love for each other inspired the film.

Their arguing finally stops as they go to bed without saying anything to each other, only thanking each other before they sleep. Malcolm wakes up alone in bed in the morning daylight. He finds Marie alone outside and joins her as they look across the distance, leaving the fate of their relationship unknown.

== Cast ==
- Zendaya as Marie Jones
- John David Washington as Malcolm Elliott

== Production ==
In 2020, Sam Levinson and Zendaya were both involved in the HBO show Euphoria, which had stopped production due to the COVID-19 pandemic, and the two discussed the possibility and idea of making a feature film project during the pandemic. Levinson pitched several possibilities to Zendaya, including a psychological thriller they would film at her home. He then began to come up with "a relationship piece that plays out in real time."

John David Washington joined the project after Levinson read 10 pages of dialogue to Washington over the phone, saying, "I couldn't believe it. It was beautiful words I heard, and at the same time very disturbing with visceral confrontations."

After receiving approval from the Writers Guild of America, SAG-AFTRA and the Directors Guild of America, principal production took place from June 17 to July 2, shooting entirely at the Caterpillar House, a private home at The Santa Lucia Preserve in Carmel-by-the-Sea, California. The film followed local COVID-19 safety protocols, including the entire cast and crew being quarantined during shooting, as well as two weeks before and after shooting, daily temperature checks, and increased sanitation measures. The crew included many members of the Euphoria crew, including cinematographer Marcell Rév and production designer Michael Grasley. Both Washington and Zendaya were responsible for doing their own makeup and picking out their own costumes, as there were no makeup artists or costume designer on set. No more than 12 people were allowed on set at a time. The production also had to be kept very confined so that the cast and crew could remain undisturbed during shooting. The film was shot on black-and-white 35 mm film.

== Release ==
In September 2020, Netflix acquired distribution rights to the film for $30 million, outbidding HBO, Amazon Studios, Searchlight Pictures, Metro-Goldwyn-Mayer, Apple TV+, A24 and Focus Features. It was released theatrically in select theaters on January 29, 2021, and then was streamed on Netflix beginning February 5, 2021. Deadline Hollywood reported the film "made hardly any money" during its theatrical run (due to the COVID-19 lockdowns). The film was the most-watched title on the platform in its debut weekend, but dropped out of the top 10 by its second.

== Reception ==
=== Critical response ===
According to review aggregator Rotten Tomatoes, 57% of 252 critic reviews were positive. The website's critics consensus reads, "Malcolm & Marie's ambitions aren't always satisfactorily fulfilled, but its flaws are often offset by the strong chemistry between the film's stars." On Metacritic, the film has a weighted average score of 53 out of 100, based on 44 critics, indicating "mixed or average reviews".

Writing for Variety, Peter Debruge said "Levinson gives his stars roughly equal time, carefully modulating the sense of balance throughout. His direction seldom seems showy, and yet, we sense the intention behind each cut as power and control shifts throughout the movie." David Ehrlich of IndieWire gave the film a grade of C+ and wrote, "Sam Levinson's exasperatingly gorgeous Malcolm & Marie is a lot like the two people who lend its title their names: confident and insecure in equal measure, stuffed to the gills with big ideas but convinced of nothing beyond its own frenzied existence, and reverent of Hollywood's past at the same time it's trying to stake a new claim for its future." Will Gompertz of BBC News awarded the film 2/5 stars, writing that "John David Washington and Zendaya have been bickering for well over an hour when a moment of theatrical excellence (at 80 mins, to be precise) lights up an otherwise pedestrian drama about a couple having a domestic." Charles Bramesco of Little White Lies criticized the film for being an "awkward, hideously overacted talkathon", scoring it with a 1/5 rating.

In a very positive review, Mike Crowley of You'll Probably Agree called Malcolm & Marie a "decent quarantine capsule", concluding that it is "pretentious in all the right ways", and scored the film with a 3.5/4 rating. Furthermore, although criticizing the film itself, Gompertz positively reviewed "the impressive acting chops of Washington and Zendaya." Bill Lowry of CNN Entertainment similarly praised their acting, writing, "pairing Zendaya and John David Washington, the movie -- quickly and stealthily shot during the pandemic -- wins points for ingenuity, then loses them with its shrill tone and the uneven hairpin turns of its writing." One of the film's early champions was FilmSpeak's Zach Marsh, who, in a glowing review, unilaterally praised the writing, the performances of Washington and Zendaya, and the cinematography, calling Malcolm & Marie "one of the greatest films of the past twenty years," and predicting that the film would come to be seen as such by critics in retrospect.

In a response to criticism, Sam Levinson said that some reviewers focused too much on Malcolm and his speech on film criticism and disregarded the importance of Marie's character and opposing viewpoint.

=== Accolades ===
Award	Category	Recipient	Result	Ref.
BET Awards	Best Actress	Zendaya	Nominated	
Black Reel Awards	Outstanding Actress	Zendaya	Nominated	
Black Reel Awards	Outstanding Breakthrough Performance – Female	Zendaya	Nominated	
Black Reel Awards	Outstanding Cinematography	Marcell Rév	Won	
Critics' Choice Movie Awards	Best Actress	Zendaya	Nominated	
Hollywood Critics Association	Best Actress	Zendaya	Nominated	
MTV Movie & TV Awards	Best Performance in a Movie	Zendaya	Nominated	
Santa Barbara International Film Festival	Virtuosos Award	Zendaya	Won	
