= Zendaya (album) =

Studio album by Zendaya
- Released: September 17, 2013
- Recorded: December 2012 – May 2013
- Studios: Mick Schultz Studios (Malibu, California); London Bridge Studios, Paramount Recording Studios, Henson Studios and 7-12 Productions (Los Angeles, California); R8D Studios and The Guest House (North Hollywood, California); Soundworks Studios (Burbank, California); Rondor Studios; Jungle City Studios (New York City)
- Genre: Electropop
- Length: 39:20
- Label: Hollywood
- Producers: Bobby Brackins; Jason Evigan; Harmony; Jonas Jeberg; Nick Jonas; Jukebox; The Monsters & Strangerz; Nic Nac; Mick Schultz; Paul "Phamous" Shelton; The Suspex

Zendaya chronology
Made in Japan (2012)	Zendaya (2013)

Singles from Zendaya
- 1. "Replay" Released: July 16, 2013; 2. "My Baby" Released: January 27, 2014

Zendaya is the debut studio album by the American actress and singer Zendaya, released on September 17, 2013, by Hollywood Records. After acting on the Disney Channel series Shake It Up, Zendaya signed a recording contract with Hollywood and began recording the album in late 2012. Musically, it is an electropop record that incorporates elements of dubstep, R&B, and urban music. Lyrically, it discusses issues of heartbreak and love.

Upon its release, it was met with positive reviews from music critics, who praised the album's production. Commercially, the album debuted on the US Billboard 200 at number 51, selling 7,000 copies in its first week. The album's lead single "Replay" was released on July 16, 2013, and its music video premiered on August 15, 2013 on Vevo and Disney Channel. The single became Zendaya's highest-charting song at the time, charting within both the top forty of the US and New Zealand. To further promote the album, Zendaya performed on a variety of television shows and set out on a North American tour entitled the Swag It Out Tour. To date, it remains as her only studio album.

== Background ==
After starting her career as an actress, landing roles in shows including Shake It Up, Zendaya began featuring on soundtracks releasing the singles "Watch Me" and "Something to Dance For". On August 8, 2012, she announced she had signed a record deal with Hollywood Records via her official Twitter account. In May 2013, it was reported her debut album would be released in the fall of 2013 and the album's lead single would be released in June. On August 13, 2013, Zendaya revealed that her debut album would be self-titled, along with the official artwork for the record.

== Music and lyrics ==
"I'm kind of creating my own music and I'm kind of creating my own zone, my own lane as an artist. I want to do rhythmic pop, it's not necessarily your average pop song. It has some kind of urban edge, some kind of more hip-hop-ish tones to it that kind of edge it up and do something a little different so it's not just your stereotypical pop music."

Zendaya consists of twelve tracks. The album is mainly rooted in urban electropop, that musically experiment with pop, R&B, trap and dubstep genres. The album's lyrical content tackles issues of love and heartbreak. After streaming the album to radio presenter Ryan Seacrest, he commented on the album's music calling is a "pop/R&B hybrid offering for the most part", he continued to comment saying the album contained "urban cuts"

The album's opening track and lead single "Replay" is a "grittier club-ready pop track", that was produced by Mick Schultz. "Replay" is an electro-R&B song with influences from glitch and dubstep. The following song "Fireflies" is blend of pop and R&B genres, that contains a "heavy beat."

"Scared" is an up-tempo pop song that lyrically speaks about "trying to save a relationship because she is scared of being alone". "Scared" was written by Tiffany Fred and Paul "Phamous" Shelton, and was described by Zendaya as having a "Kanye West type of vibe". "Love You Forever" is an up-tempo "90s throwback" song that has been compared to the work of the late singer Aaliyah. Lyrically the song discusses Zendaya falling in love on the dance floor, the concept of the song is introduced with lyrics such as "We on that all night, get it right/ If you keep on moving like that, I might love you forever/ We on that first time love high/ Just keep on moving/ 'Cause I might love you Forever ."

== Promotion ==
On September 19, 2013, Zendaya made her first national performance on The Ellen DeGeneres Show, in which she sang the album's lead single. On October 29, Zendaya was the New Artist of the Month on The Today Show, where she performed an acoustic version of "Replay". On November 29, she performed "Replay" on BET's 106 & Park. Zendaya further promoted the project by hosting events like "106 & park" special "106 & prom", in which she spoke about her upcoming music project. In early 2012 Zendaya embarked on a North American tour entitled Swag It Out Tour, in order to promote her debut album and the Shake It Up soundtrack. The tour started on August 5, 2012, in Oakland and finished on December 17, 2013. The tour consisted of two legs over America and Canada with a total of twenty one shows.

=== Singles ===
"Replay" was released as the album's lead single on July 16, 2013. The song was met with positive reviews from critics noting the single from breaking the musical "mould" and praised the song for its catchy lyrics. "Replay" was a moderate success in the US, where it debuted at number 77 and reached a peak of 40 on the US Billboard Hot 100, making "Replay" her first Top 40 hit. The song also made appearances on the New Zealand chart and US Billboard Dance Club Play, by peaking at 18 and 3, respectively. It was however a top 10 hit in Australia where it peaked at 8. A remix of "My Baby", featuring American rappers Ty Dolla Sign, Iamsu! and Bobby Brackins, was released as a CD single but failed to chart. Music videos were created for both versions.

== Critical reception ==
AllMusic praised the self-titled album, commending its production saying the album "delivers sleek pop thrills with fewer growing pains than some of her predecessors suffered on their early albums". AllMusic continued to compare the album to the debut of Cassie, overall saying the album "is a streamlined, self-assured first effort".

== Commercial performance ==
The album debuted on the US Billboard 200 at number 51, selling 7,000 copies in its first week.

== Track listing ==
No.	Title	Writer(s)	Producer(s)	Length
1.	"Replay"	Zendaya Stoermer Coleman; Mick Schultz; Paul "Phamous" Shelton; Tiffany Fred	Schultz; Fred^{[a]}; Ajayi Jackson^{[a]}; Shelton^{[a]}	3:29
2.	"Fireflies"	Harmony Samuels; Dawn Richard; Andrew "Druski" Scott	Harmony^{[p]}; Carmen Reece^{[a]}	4:13
3.	"Butterflies"	Jason Evigan; Sam Watters; Jordan Johnson; Marcus Lomax; Stefan Johnson	Evigan; The Monsters & Strangerz; Lomax^{[a]}; S. Johnson^{[a]}; Watters^{[a]}	3:47
4.	"Putcha Body Down"	Jonas Jeberg; Marlin "Hookman" Bonds; CJ Holland	Jeberg^{[p]}	3:19
5.	"Heaven Lost an Angel"	Coleman; Lomax; Clarence Coffee; J. Johnson; S. Johnson	The Monsters & Strangerz; Lomax^{[a]}; S. Johnson^{[a]}	3:11
6.	"Cry for Love"	James Roston; Chris "Flict" Aparri	Flict	3:48
7.	"Only When You're Close"	Coleman; Lomax; J. Johnson; Autumn Rowe; Coffee; S. Johnson	The Monsters & Strangerz; Lomax^{[a]}; S. Johnson^{[a]}	3:44
8.	"Bottle You Up"	Livvi Franc; Evigan; Mitch Allan	The Suspex; Dan Book^{[a]}	3:38
9.	"Scared"	Ronald Jackson; Fred; Robert L. Allen; Shelton	Jukebox	2:57
10.	"Love You Forever"	Coleman; Nick Jonas; Shelton; Fred; Marcus Kincy	Jonas; Shelton	4:07
11.	"My Baby"	Coleman; Nicholas Balding; Bobby Brackins	Brackins; Nic Nac	3:07

United States Target bonus track
No.	Title	Writer(s)	Producer(s)	Length
12.	"Parachute"	Coleman; Shelton; Pierre Heath; Nick Gross; Mike Riley; Anthony Vasquez; Kimberly Dopson	The STRZ; Animal	3:10
Total length:				42:30

Notes

- ^{^[p]} signifies a primary and vocal producer
- ^{^[a]} signifies a vocal producer

== Personnel ==
Musicians

- Zendaya – lead vocals
- Carmen Reece – backing vocals on "Fireflies"
- Harmony Samuels – all instruments on "Fireflies"
- Jonas Jeberg – all instruments and programming on "Putcha Body Down"
- Jaiden the Cure – backing vocals on "Cry for Love"
- Livvi Franc – additional backing vocals on "Bottle You Up"
- The Suspex – all instruments on "Bottle You Up"
- Rob Allen – backing vocals on "Scared"
- Tiffany Fred – backing vocals on "Scared"
- Jukebox – keyboards, percussion, and programming on "Scared"
- Marcus Kincy – keyboards on "Love You Forever"
- Nick Jonas – programming on "Love You Forever"

Technical

- Brian "Big Bass" Gardner – mastering
- Neal H Pogue – mixing on all tracks except "Love You Forever"
- Jeremy Cimino – mixing on "Love You Forever"
- Mick Schultz – engineering on "Replay"
- Carlos King – engineering on "Butterflies"
- Jose Cardoza – engineering on "Butterflies"
- Stefan Johnson – engineering on "Butterflies", "Heaven Lost an Angel", and "Only When You're Close"
- Jonas Jeberg – engineering on "Putcha Body Down"
- Dustin – engineering on "Putcha Body Down"
- Aldo Lehman – engineering on "Cry for Love"
- Nic Nac – engineering on "My Baby"
- Carmen Reece – backing vocals arrangement on "Fireflies"
- Zendaya – executive production
- Al Manerson – executive production
- Kazembe Ajamu – executive production
- Jeremiah Jhop Olvera – mixing assistance on all tracks except "Love You Forever"
- Vernon Mungo – mixing assistance on all tracks except "Love You Forever"
- Michael Manata – mixing assistance on "Love You Forever"

Visuals

- Enny Joo – art direction, design
- Zendaya – cover concept
- Dave Snow – creative direction
- Michael Schwartz – photography

== Charts ==
Chart (2013)	Peak position
US Billboard 200	51

== Release history ==
List of release dates, showing region, edition, and label
Region	Date	Edition(s)	Label
United States	September 17, 2013	Standard; Target edition	Hollywood Records
Canada	September 17, 2013	Standard	Hollywood Records
Various	April 11, 2014	Standard	Universal Music
