= Frank H. Ogawa Plaza =

Park in Oakland, Alameda County, United States of America

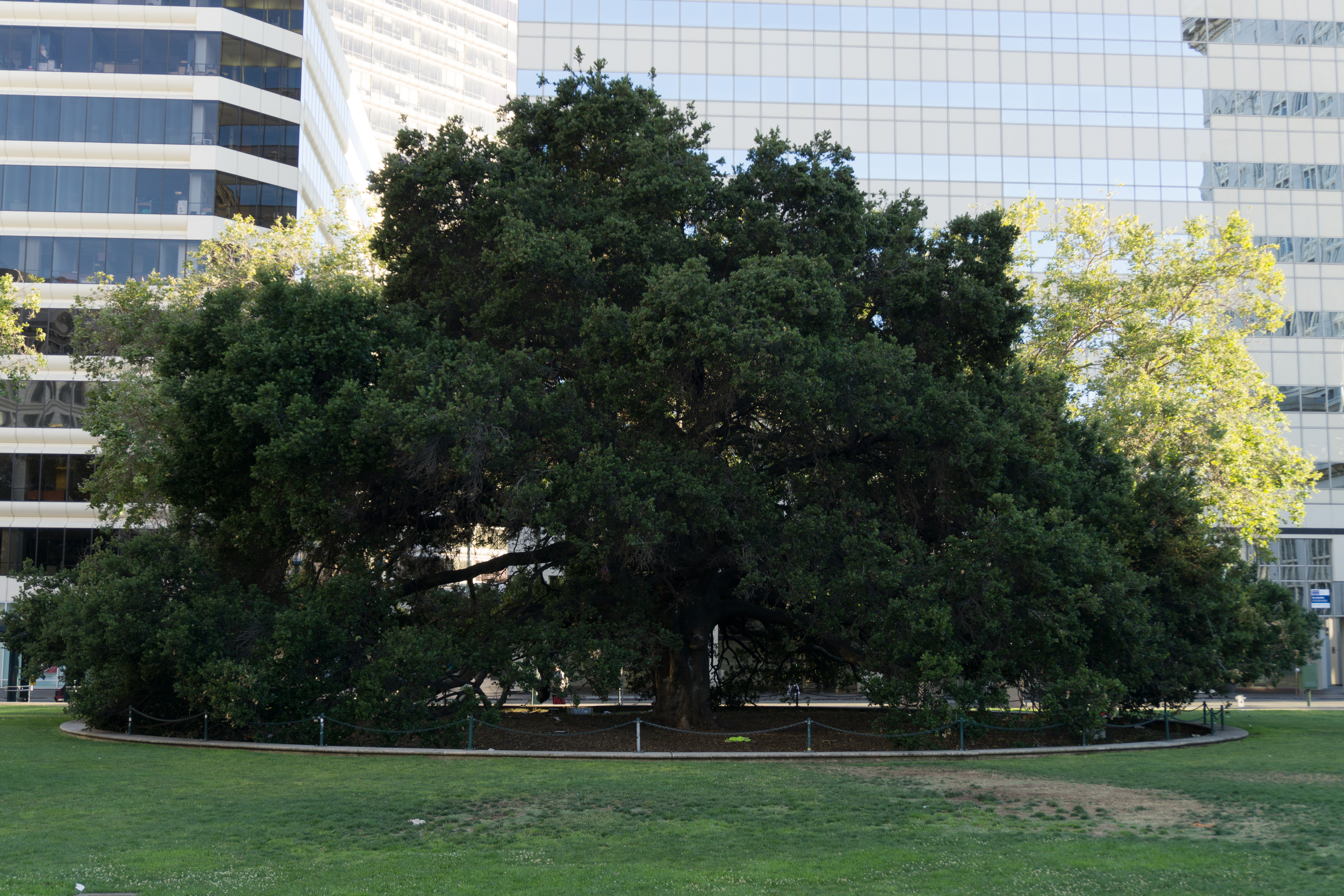
- Oak Tree growing in Frank H. Ogawa Plaza

- Location within Oakland, California Location within the United States
- Former name: City Hall Plaza
- Namesake: Frank H. Ogawa
- Area: 160,000 square feet (15,000 m^{2})
- Coordinates: 37.8050°N 122.2718°W

Construction
- Inauguration: 1998

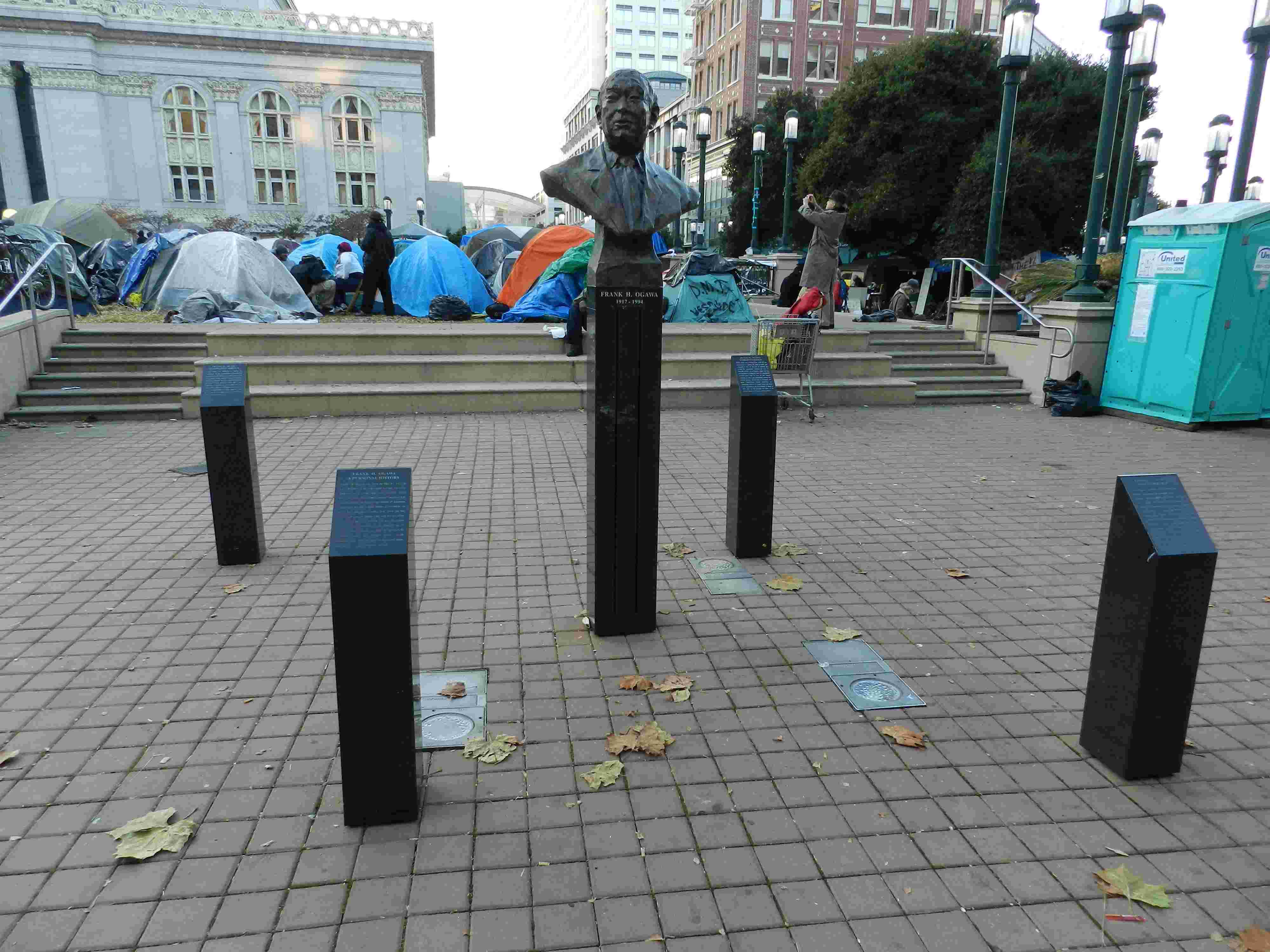
a Bust of Frank Ogawa on the Grounds of the Plaza

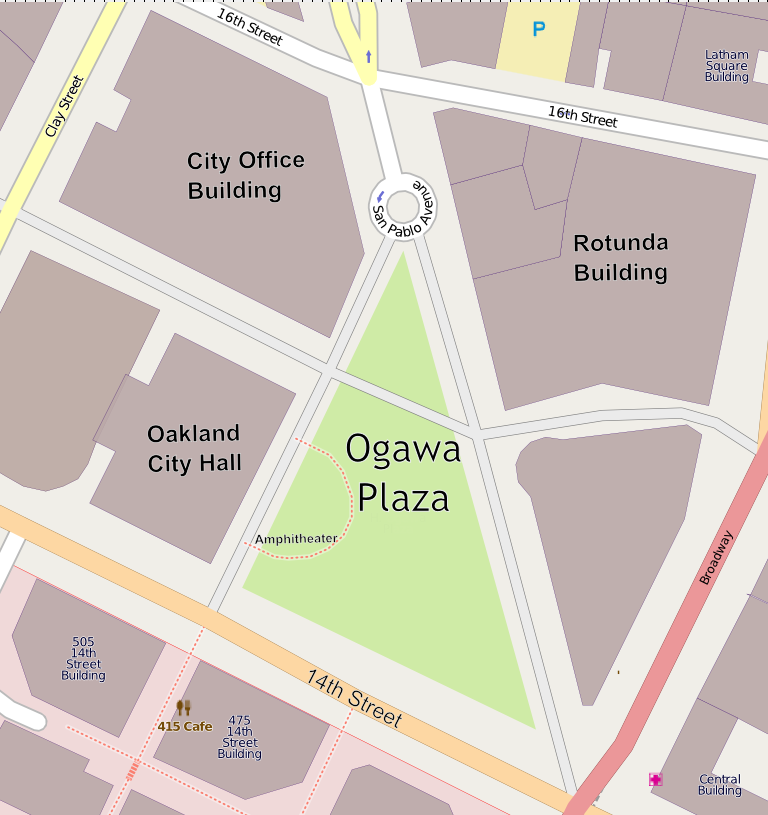
Ogawa plaza

Frank H. Ogawa Plaza is a public square located in Downtown Oakland.

== Location and elements ==
Frank H. Ogawa Plaza is located where San Pablo Avenue converges with Broadway and 14th Street. The west side of the plaza is the site of Oakland City Hall and a city office building. Around the plaza are several Beaux-Arts styled commercial buildings from the early 20th century. New buildings have been constructed to fit visually with the older architecture.

The plaza is a 160,000-square-foot (15,000 m^{2}) public space. Most of the plaza is composed of "The Commons", a raised lawn. The plaza also features "The Forum", or amphitheater—a space for public gatherings and performances. A portion of San Pablo Avenue which runs along the north side of the plaza has been pedestrianized and incorporated into the plaza, along with the blocks of 15th Street on either side of the plaza. An entrance to the 12th Street Oakland City Center BART station is located at the intersection with Broadway. At the center of the plaza is a single large Coast Live Oak, the symbol of the city.

The plaza is adjacent to the Oakland City Center complex, directly across 14th Street to the south. Latham Square, a small plaza where Telegraph Avenue converges with Broadway, is one block to the northeast.

== History ==
In 1896, the San Francisco Chronicle reported on a young Jack London giving speeches in what was then called "City Hall park". The open space in front of the city hall was part of Oakland's Administrative Buildings project that included the redevelopment of the city center in 1994. 1998 marked the completion of the renovated plaza.

Along with being the seat of government, the area has become part of the city's arts culture with the annual Art and Soul Festival and publicly commissioned art. In 2001, the city council commissioned a sculpture for the plaza from artist Bruce Beasley. The sculpture, Vitality, was completed in 2002.

The plaza has been the site of various protests and civil disobedience.

== Name of the plaza ==
In 1998, the Oakland City Council renamed City Hall Plaza as "Frank H. Ogawa Plaza" in honor of Frank H. Ogawa, a civil rights leader and the first Japanese American to serve on the Oakland City Council. Ogawa served on the Council from 1966 until his death in 1994. The plaza displays a bronze bust of Ogawa.

== Occupy Oakland ==
Members of Occupy Oakland used Ogawa Plaza as a main protest encampment in the fall of 2011. Their presence was criticized for potential health and safety concerns. However, others defended the camp, presenting statistics showing that Oakland became safer during the occupation; they showed e-mails of police attempting to cover that up. Frank H. Ogawa Plaza was unofficially renamed as "Oscar Grant Plaza" by the Occupy Oakland protesters. Oscar Grant was a young Hayward man who was killed by a Bay Area Rapid Transit police officer in 2009.
