= Luce (band) =

American rock band

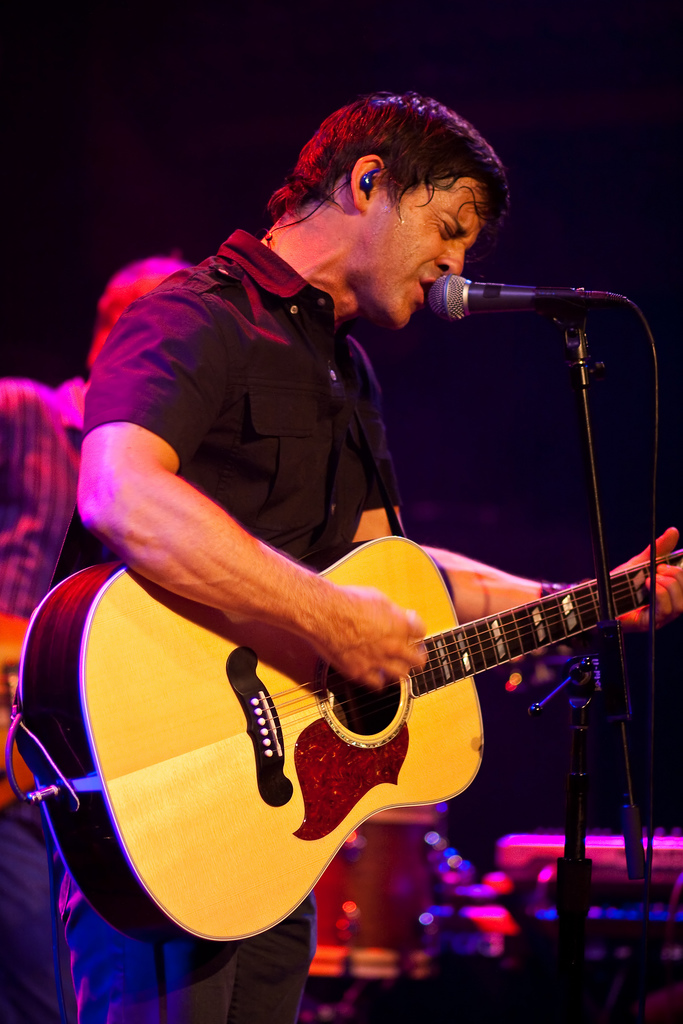
- Tom Luce

Background information
- Origin: San Francisco, California
- Genres: Alternative; Pop; Rock
- Years active: 2000–present
- Label: Opus Music Ventures
- Members: Tom Luce; Adam Rossi; Kevin White; Dylan Brock; Brian Zalewski
- Past members: Larry Rigs; Brian Kroll; Steve Bowman
- Website: Official Luce Website

Luce is a rock band based in San Francisco, California. The band was founded in 2000 by lead singer Tom Luce and is made up of keyboardist/producer Adam Rossi, drummer Brian Zalewski, bassist Alex Cordrey, and lead guitarist Dylan Brock.

Luce's self-titled first album, released in 2001, met with success in the San Francisco Bay Area, winning the California Music Award for Outstanding Debut. It was promoted heavily on the San Francisco radio station KFOG; a single from the album entitled "Good Day" peaked at #39 on the Billboard Adult Top 40 chart. "Good Day" was heard in the movies 13 Going on 30 and How to Lose a Guy in 10 Days and TV shows The O.C. and Alias, and was also featured in commercials for American Leather. The band makes appearances all over Northern California and the U.S.; one notable appearance was at Golden Gate Park for the finish of the 2005 Bay to Breakers race.

Luce's second album, Never Ending, was released April 19, 2005, and the first single, "Buy A Dog", was the most played song on at least 13 radio stations, including KFOG and WRLT in Nashville. On Nov. 6 of '05, Tom Luce and Adam Rossi sang the national anthem at Arrowhead Stadium before the Kansas City Chiefs hosted the Oakland Raiders.

In 2007 the band suffered from two setbacks; Tom Luce's house burnt to the ground and the trailer containing all their equipment was stolen while they were touring. For a short time, the band broke up before regrouping and reassembling. In September 2008, Luce went back into the recording studio to record an EP of cover songs; this exercise was a way for the band to improve their musicianship and to rejuvenate and inspire the band. Also in 2008, Luce signed with Opus Music Ventures, a Bay Area record label and in 2009 they released their third album titled "Corner of the World".

On January 22, 2010, Tom Luce and his two brothers created an album titled "Luce Brothers." In April 2010, Luce released "The Year We'll Have." Luce's most recent studio album is "Fall to Fly" released in February 2013. 2016 brought the band back to performing locally and recording as they participated an original song to the Notes4Hope CD that brings artist together to raise money for breast cancer research and education. The band is currently in the studio working on their 5th full-length CD.

== Members ==
Current

- Tom Luce (vocals, guitar)
- Adam Rossi (keyboards)
- Brian Zalewski (drums)
- Alex Cordrey (bass guitar)
- Dylan Brock (lead guitar)

Former

- Kevin White - bass
- Kyle Wheeler - trumpet
- Johnathon Moe - drums
- Brian Kroll - guitar
- Matt Blackett - guitar
- Steve Bowman - drums
- Larry Riggs - bass guitar

== Discography ==
- Luce (2001 - What Are Records?)
  - 1) Long Way Down
  - 2) Good Day
  - 3) Numb
  - 4) Electric Chair
  - 5) Life
  - 6) In the Middle There
  - 7) Sunniest of Weekends
  - 8) Bring Her In
  - 9) Here
  - 10) After Tomorrow
- Luce (2002 - Nettwerk Records)
  - 1) Long Way Down
  - 2) Good Day
  - 3) Numb
  - 4) Electric Chair
  - 5) Life
  - 6) In the Middle There
  - 7) Sunniest of Weekends
  - 8) Bring Her In
  - 9) Here
  - 10) After Tomorrow
  - 11) If I Had the Wind
  - 12) Hidden Track (Waiting)
- Never Ending (2005)
  - 1) From the World of the Lonely
  - 2) Buy a Dog
  - 3) Amsterdam
  - 4) The Sweetest Smile
  - 5) Fortunately, I
  - 6) Worth the Wait
  - 7) Wanna Be
  - 8) Interlude One
  - 9) Never Ending
  - 10) Outside of it All
  - 11) With a Kiss
  - 12) Diamond Lights (a.k.a. "Good Thing")
  - 13) Interlude Two
  - 14) Maria
- Songs from the Covers Catalogue (2007)
  - 1) Eleanor Rigby
  - 2) Anytime
  - 3) Somebody More Like You
  - 4) Bridge Over Troubled Water
  - 5) Better Things
  - 6) In Every Sunflower
- Corner of the World (2009)
  - 1) Corner of the World
  - 2) Always Will
  - 3) My Life Alone
  - 4) Gotta Live
  - 5) Tidal Waves
  - 6) Blue Violet Fade
  - 7) Empty Rooms
  - 8) Life for a Life
  - 9) Awake
  - 10) For You
- Live At The Broderick House (2010)
  - 1) Trumpet Intro
  - 2) In The Middle
  - 3) Worth The Wait
  - 4) Buy A Dog
  - 5) Diamond Lights
  - 6) Corner of the World/Acid Rain
  - 7) Change A Thing
  - 8) Waiting
  - 9) Good Day
  - 10) 50 Ways feat. Elliot Cahn
  - 11) Sunniest of California
  - 12) The Year We'll Have
  - 13) After Tomorrow
- The Year We'll Have (2010)
  - 1) Won't Change A Thing
  - 2) Good Day
  - 3) The Year We'll Have
  - 4) Willing to Try
  - 5) Gotta Live
  - 6) Corner of the World
  - 7) After Tomorrow
  - 8) All That I've Been Waiting For
- Fall to Fly (2013)
  - 1) Something Came Around
  - 2) Fall to Fly
  - 3) Ruby
  - 4) Safe and Sound
  - 5) Many Miles Away
  - 6) Wait and See
  - 7) The Greatest Sword
  - 8) Windowsill
  - 9) Found
  - 10) Cool Life

=== Other contributions ===
- Live at the World Café: Vol. 15 - Handcrafted (2002, World Café) - "Long Way Down"
