= Replay (Zendaya song) =

2013 single by Zendaya

Single by Zendaya

from the album Zendaya
- Released: July 16, 2013
- Recorded: 2013
- Studio: Mick Schultz Studios (Malibu, California)
- Genre: Pop
- Length: 3:29
- Label: Hollywood
- Songwriters: Mick Schultz; Tiffany Fred; Paul "Phamous" Phamous; Zendaya Stoermer Coleman
- Producer: Mick Schultz

Zendaya singles chronology
"Contagious Love" (2013)	"Replay" (2013)	"My Baby" (2014)

Music video
- "Replay" on YouTube

"Replay" is a song by American actress and singer Zendaya from her self-titled debut album (2013). The song was released on July 16, 2013, as the lead single from the album through Hollywood Records after being premiered on July 12, 2013. The song was written by Zendaya in collaboration with Mick Schultz, Tiffany Fred and Paul Phamous while the song's production was handled by Mick Schultz.

Critical response to "Replay" was positive. The song reached number forty on the United States' Billboard Hot 100 chart. It has been certified triple platinum by the Recording Industry Association of America (RIAA). The song also made appearances on charts in Australia, where it reached the top ten, New Zealand, Canada, and Flanders (Belgium).

An accompanying video was recorded on June 1, 2013, in Los Angeles and directed by Colin Tilley; the music video premiered on MTV on August 15, 2013, and later that day on Zendaya's new Vevo channel. It was inspired by Janet Jackson's "The Pleasure Principle" video, referencing the clip in several scenes. To further promote the song, Zendaya performed it on The Ellen DeGeneres Show and included it as part of her setlist for her debut tour.

== Background ==
After starting her career as an actress, acting in shows including Shake It Up, she began featuring on soundtracks releasing the singles "Watch Me" and "Something to Dance For". On August 8, 2012, Zendaya announced she had signed a record deal with Hollywood Records, via her official Twitter account she commented on the signing writing; "epic moment in my life...it's official!!! HOLLYWOOD RECORDS!!!", the comment also included pictures of herself with the label executives signing a contract. In May 2013, it was reported that Zendaya's debut album would be released in the fall of 2013 and the album's lead single would be released in June.

== Composition ==
"Replay" has a length of three minutes and twenty-nine seconds. Musically, "Replay" is a pop song infused with elements of dubstep and electro-R&B. Zendaya's vocal range spans from the low note of F♯_{3} to the high note of C♯_{5}.

The song was composed by Tiffany Fred and Paul "Phamous" Shelton. "It's a very special song. I think it's very different and unexpected for me because I feel like it's on a higher level production wise", Zendaya said in an interview with Radio Disney: "It's one of those songs that's creating its own lane or genre. I don't think it's pop, I don't think it's hip-hop, I don't think it's R&B. I don't even know where you would consider it because it kind of mixes that pop sound beat with a very R&B kind of melody". Zendaya describes the single as not basic pop music, but having an urban twist to it.

== Promotion ==
Zendaya released a preview of "Replay" on July 12, 2013, and released it to Radio Disney the next day. On July 16, 2013, she officially released "Replay" on iTunes. In August 2013, Zendaya released two previews of the music video. On September 19, 2013, Zendaya made her first national performance on The Ellen DeGeneres Show, in which she sang the album's lead single. On October 29, 2013, Zendaya was the New Artist of the Month on The Today Show, where she performed an acoustic version of "Replay". On November 29, 2013, she performed "Replay" on BET's 106 & Park. Zendaya further promoted the project by hosting events like the 106 & Park special "106 & Prom", in which she spoke about her upcoming music project. In early 2012, Zendaya embarked on a North American tour entitled Swag It Out Tour, to promote her debut album and the Shake It Up soundtrack. The tour started on August 5, 2012, in Oakland and finished on December 17, 2013. The tour consisted of two legs over America and Canada with a total of twenty one shows.

== Reception ==
Sam Lansky of Idolator praised the song calling "Replay" a "sick burner with a pristine pop finish." Lanksy went on to praise the song calling it "mature, self-assured and sexy without being overly provocative" and compared the song to that of Usher's "Climax" or a Cassie mixtape track. Muumuse praised the song and Zendaya for the maturity, praising the production and its "strange and drippy, full of spacey", "something more urban" sound. He also compared "Replay" to the music of Cassie and JoJo.

== Commercial performance ==
"Replay" made its debut at number 42 on the Pop Digital Songs issue dated July 26, 2013, with 12,000 digital downloads sold, according to Nielsen SoundScan. The song subsequently debuted at number seventy seven on the US Billboard Hot 100, climbing nine positions to number sixty eight the following week. "Replay" eventually peaked at number forty on the Hot 100 and was certified triple platinum by the RIAA, and has since sold over 1.2 million copies in the US as of December 2014. To date, "Replay" is Zendaya's first and only top-forty hit, her most successful and only single as a lead artist.

== Music video ==
The video of the song was recorded on June 1, 2013, in Los Angeles and directed by Colin Tilley. The dance is choreographed by Ian Eastwood. The music video premiered on MTV on August 15, 2013 and later that day on Zendaya's new Vevo channel. It was inspired by Janet Jackson's "The Pleasure Principle" video, referencing the clip in several scenes. The video peaked at number five on the iTunes Music Video chart. As of June 29, 2024, "Replay" is Vevo Certified, which means that it has accumulated 100,000,000 views on her YouTube channel for Vevo.

== Track listing ==
Digital single

1. "Replay" – 3:29

Remixes

1. "Replay" (Ralphi Rosario remix) – 8:07
2. "Replay" (Jason Nevins remix) – 6:34
3. "Replay" (It's the Kue remix!) – 6:13
4. "Replay" (Belanger remix) – 6:24
5. "Replay" (Riddler remix) – 7:13
6. "Replay" (Jump Smokers remix) – 4:48

Replayed and Remixed – one

1. "Replay" (Cahill club mix) – 6:05
2. "Replay" (Cahill edit) – 3:45
3. "Replay" (Ralphi Rosario remix) – 8:06
4. "Replay" (Country Club Martini Crew remix) – 6:42
5. "Replay" (Jump Smokers remix) – 4:48
6. "Replay" (Jason Nevins remix) – 6:34

Replayed and Remixed – two

1. "Replay" (Monsieur Adi remix) – 5:28
2. "Replay" (Monsieur Adi remix / radio edit) – 3:38
3. "Replay" (Belanger remix) – 6:24
4. "Replay" (Bit Error remix) – 5:43
5. "Replay" (Riddler remix) – 7:13
6. "Replay" (It's the Kue remix!) – 6:13

== Credits and personnel ==
Recording and management

- Recorded at Mick Schultz Studios (Malibu, California)
- Mixed at TheHotPurplePettingZoo
- Mastered at Bernie Grundman Mastering
- Mick Schultz Publishing (BMI), Irving Music, Inc./Underdog East Songs (BMI), Paul "Phamous" Shelton Publishing Designee, Seven Summits Music (BMI) obo itself and Z-Swagg Music Publishing, LLC (BMI)

Personnel

- Zendaya – vocals, lyrics
- Mick Schultz – lyrics, production, recording
- Tiffany Fred – lyrics, vocal production
- Paul "Phamous" Shelton – lyrics, vocal production
- Ajayi Jackson – vocal production
- Nealhpogue – mixing
- Vernon Mungo – mix assistant
- Jeremiah Jhop Olvera – assistant
- Brian Gardner – mastering

Credits adapted from Zendaya liner notes.

== Charts ==
=== Weekly charts ===
Weekly chart performance for "Replay"
Chart (2013–2014)	Peak position
Australia (ARIA)	8
Belgium (Ultratip Bubbling Under Flanders)	89
Canada Hot 100 (Billboard)	83
New Zealand (Recorded Music NZ)	18
US Billboard Hot 100	40
US Dance Club Songs (Billboard)	3
US Pop Airplay (Billboard)	20

=== Year-end charts ===
2013 year-end chart performance for "Replay"
Chart (2013)	Position
US Hot Dance/Club Songs (Billboard)	43

2014 year-end chart performance for "Replay"
Chart (2014)	Position
Australia (ARIA)	96

== Certifications ==
Certifications and sales for "Replay"
Region	Certification	Certified units/sales
Australia (ARIA)	2× Platinum	140,000^{‡}
New Zealand (RMNZ)	Platinum	30,000^{‡}
United States (RIAA)	3× Platinum	3,000,000^{‡}
^{‡} Sales+streaming figures based on certification alone.

== Release history ==
Release dates and formats for "Replay"
Region	Date	Format	Label
United States	July 13, 2013	Radio impact	Hollywood; Republic
United States	July 16, 2013	Digital download	Hollywood; Republic
Various	July 23, 2013	Digital download – remixes	Hollywood; Republic
Canada	August 22, 2013	Digital download	Hollywood; Republic
United States	October 1, 2013	Mainstream airplay	Hollywood; Republic
Various	February 24, 2014	Digital download – Replayed and Remixed – one	Hollywood; Republic
Various	February 24, 2014	Digital download – Replayed and Remixed – two	Hollywood; Republic
Italy	February 25, 2014	Digital download	Hollywood; Republic
