= Something New (Zendaya song) =

Single by Zendaya featuring Chris Brown
- Released: February 3, 2016
- Recorded: 2015
- Genre: R&B
- Length: 3:32
- Label: Hollywood; Republic
- Songwriters: Khristopher Riddick-Tynes; Kenneth Edmonds; Leon Thomas III; Zendaya; Chris Brown
- Producers: Babyface; Khris Riddick-Tynes; Prince Chrishan

Zendaya singles chronology
"My Jam" (2015)	"Something New" (2016)	"Rewrite the Stars" (2018)

Chris Brown singles chronology
"Fine by Me" (2015)	"Something New" (2016)	"Paradise" (2016)

"Something New" is a song by American singer Zendaya featuring fellow American singer Chris Brown. It was released as a single on February 3, 2016, by Hollywood Records and Republic Records. The song samples TLC's "Creep".

== Background ==
The song samples the 1994 TLC song "Creep", which Zendaya has noted as one of the things that attracted her initially to the song. She first recorded the song as a duet with musician Babyface, although his verse was later swapped out with one by Brown. After hearing Brown's verse, Zendaya rerecorded her verses, telling iHeartRadio that she didn't want to be shown up by him.

== Music video ==
On February 3, 2016, Zendaya uploaded the audio for "Something New" on her YouTube channel. Three weeks later, on February 23, 2016, Zendaya uploaded the official lyric video of "Something New" on her Vevo channel.

However, its official music video remains unreleased with the exception of a 25-second clip shown on The Ellen DeGeneres Show. T-Boz also confirmed she shot a cameo in the video and pictures of her cameo are released by TLC fan page Cyber TLC World.

Zendaya decided to not have the music video premiered due to not wanting to associate with Chris Brown after he made light of singer Kehlani's statements on contemplating suicide. In August 2020, Brown publicly asked Zendaya to release the music video, coincidingly sharing a 15 second snippet of the video on his Instagram stories.

== Charts ==
Chart (2016)	Peak position
US Billboard Hot 100	93
US Hot R&B/Hip-Hop Songs (Billboard)	27
US Pop Airplay (Billboard)	28
US Rhythmic Airplay (Billboard)	10

== Certifications ==
Region	Certification	Certified units/sales
New Zealand (RMNZ)	Gold	15,000^{‡}
^{‡} Sales+streaming figures based on certification alone.
