= Empire season 3 =

Empire
- Season 3
- Promotional poster
- Starring: Terrence Howard; Taraji P. Henson; Bryshere Y. Gray; Trai Byers; Grace Byers; Gabourey Sidibe; Ta'Rhonda Jones; Serayah McNeill; Xzibit; Morocco Omari; Bre-Z
- No. of episodes: 18

Release
- Original network: Fox
- Original release: September 21, 2016 – May 24, 2017

Season chronology
- ← Previous; Season 2 Next → Season 4

The third season of the American television drama series Empire premiered on September 21, 2016, in the United States on Fox. The third season was ordered on January 15, 2016. The show is produced by 20th Century Fox Television, in association with Imagine Entertainment, Lee Daniels Entertainment, Danny Strong Productions and Little Chicken Inc. The showrunners for this season are Ilene Chaiken, Danny Strong and Lee Daniels. The season aired on Wednesday at 9:00 pm, the same slot as the previous seasons. The season concluded on May 24, 2017 and consisted of 18 episodes.

== Premise ==
The show centers around a hip hop music and entertainment company, Empire Entertainment, and the drama among the members of the founders' family as they fight for control of the company.

== Cast and characters ==
=== Main cast ===
- Terrence Howard as Lucious Lyon
- Taraji P. Henson as Cookie Lyon
- Bryshere Y. Gray as Hakeem Lyon
- Jussie Smollett as Jamal Lyon
- Trai Byers as Andre Lyon
- Grace Byers as Anika Lyon
- Gabourey Sidibe as Becky Williams
- Ta'Rhonda Jones as Porsha Taylor
- Serayah as Tiana Brown
- Morocco Omari as Tariq Cousins
- Xzibit as Shyne Johnson
- Bre-Z as Freda Gatz

=== Recurring cast ===
- Kaitlin Doubleday as Rhonda Lyon
- Leslie Uggams as Leah Walker
- Tasha Smith as Carol Holloway
- Vivica A. Fox as Candace Holloway
- Sierra A. McClain as Nessa Parker
- Ajiona Alexus as Young Cookie
- Jeremy Carver as Young Lucious
- Taye Diggs as Angelo DuBois
- Andre Royo as Thirsty Rawlings
- Samuel Hunt as Xavier Rosen
- Romeo Miller as Gram
- Phylicia Rashad as Diana DuBois
- Ezri Walker as Zeah
- Juan Antonio as Phillip
- Tobias Truvillion as D-Major
- Nia Long as Giuliana Green
- Demi Moore as Nurse Claudia
- Veronika Bozeman as Veronica
- Mike Moh as Steve Cho
- Claudette Burchett as Juanita

=== Guest cast ===
- French Montana as Vaughn
- Birdman as himself
- Mariah Carey as Kitty
- Eva Longoria as Charlotte Frost
- Sticky Fingaz as Brick
- Remy Ma as herself
- Rumer Willis as Tory Ash
- Estelle as Delphine
- Tinashe as herself
- Fetty Wap as Trig

== Production ==
=== Development ===
Empire was renewed for a third season on January 15, 2016. It was later announced that the season will premiere on September 21, 2016. Fox released a promotional poster on July 14, 2016, for the season, showcasing both Lucious Lyon and Cookie Lyon.

=== Casting ===
TVLine announced on June 18, 2016, that Xzibit who plays Shyne Johnson, Lucious’ drug-dealing adversary, was upgraded to a series regular for the third season after being a recurring role in the second season. On July 8, 2016, Entertainment Weekly announced that rapper French Montana will appear in the third-season premiere, playing music mogul Vaughn, a member of Lucious Lyon's powerful inner circle. Birdman will also appear on the show as himself. The Hollywood Reporter announced on July 13, 2016, that Sierra McClain will join the show in a recurring role. She will be playing Nessa, Shyne's loyal protege whom Lucious is eager to sign. In August 2016, it was announced Mariah Carey would appear as Kitty, a superstar who collaborates with Jamal. On August 29, 2016, it was announced that Phylicia Rashad had joined the cast. On November 22, 2016, it was announced Nia Long would appear in a recurring role as Giuliana, a night club owner. On January 30, 2017, it was announced Eva Longoria would guest star. On February 21, 2017, Demi Moore was announced to be joining the cast of the series, making an appearance in the season finale, before recurring in Season 4. In episode 13, Estelle will reprise her season 1 role as Empire recording artist Delphine.

== Episodes ==
No. overall	No. in season	Title	Directed by	Written by	Original release date	Prod. code	U.S. viewers (millions)
31	1	"Light in Darkness"	Sanaa Hamri	Malcolm Spellman & Joshua Allen	September 21, 2016	3AXP01	10.87
Following the events of "Past is Prologue", Hakeem leaves the altar, and a rooftop fight between Anika and Rhonda leads to Rhonda crashing down to a car, killing her. Anika gives birth to a girl named Bella Lyon, while Hakeem heads drunk to Tiana's house. Lucious uses Empire's new music-streaming service, Empire-X-Stream to pursue his music legacy and clashes with Tariq, who leads a federal task force to investigate him. Cookie is willing to focus on anything besides Lucious. Andre starts having hallucinations of Rhonda. Shyne's protegee, Nessa Parker, impresses Lucious at the Empire-X-Stream Launch Event. Lucious invites Tariq to a tense dinner with the Lyons.
32	2	"Sin That Amends"	Craig Brewer	Cherien Dabis & Carlito Rodriguez	September 28, 2016	3AXP02	9.65
Jamal partners with Councilman Angelo Dubois to host a summit for gun violence awareness; Lucious tries to win over Cookie; Hakeem and Nessa start to record new songs together; Anika finds Tariq's hidden camera; Andre is racially profiled by the Police.
33	3	"What Remains Is Bestial"	Millicent Shelton	Diane Ademu-John & Eric Haywood	October 5, 2016	3AXP03	9.25
Cookie asks superstar Kitty (Mariah Carey) to record a new song with Jamal, hoping to help him regain his ability to perform. Andre is falsely accused of more serious charges during the trial for his arrest. Hakeem and Gram vie for Tiana's attention, calling each other out in Diss tracks. Lucious plans to regain full control of Empire after releasing the Black half of Jamal's album and Cookie retaliates by declaring war on Lucious. Andre is confronted by Tariq, who wants him to turn on his father in exchange for having the charges dropped.
34	4	"Cupid Kills"	Hanelle Culpepper	Matt Pyken & Attica Locke	October 12, 2016	3AXP04	9.27
Just as Cookie inches closer to Angelo, Lucious starts seeing him as a threat. Jamal returns to see Freda Gatz, who has been brutally beaten in jail, and Shyne and Andre physically fight after the latter informs Nessa that Shyne is exploiting her. Lucious forces Shyne to sign her deal. Andre starts to have feelings for Nessa and they make love as Rhonda appears and encourages Andre.
35	5	"One Before Another"	Mario Van Peebles	Joshua Allen & Carlito Rodriguez	November 9, 2016	3AXP05	8.15
Jamal teams up with Hakeem for a performance that he thinks could help him face his fears; Cookie is caught off guard during a routine meeting with her probation officer. Lucious informs Hakeem of Andre's developing romance to boost the music-streaming subscriptions on Empire-X-Stream.
36	6	"Chimes at Midnight"	Sanaa Hamri	Cherien Dabis & Eric Haywood	November 16, 2016	3AXP06	8.39
When Empire is hacked, the leak creates feuds between artists and among the Lyon family; Andre tries to prove his worth to the company; Lucious is determined to divide Cookie and Angelo; Jamal is caught in a love triangle.
37	7	"What We May Be"	Kevin Bray	Diane Ademu-John & Malcom Spellman	November 30, 2016	3AXP07	7.84
Cookie tries to set up the perfect family dinner to impress Angelo's mother, Diana; Jamal's use of old home videos chronicling Cookie's childhood cause her to face the truth about her father; Andre plans an unlikely duet.
38	8	"The Unkindest Cut"	Dennie Gordon	Attica Locke & Jamie Rosengard	December 7, 2016	3AXP08	7.00
Andre sabotages Tiana's big appearance at a fashion event, headed by designer Helene Von Wyeth (Gina Gershon) in order to get Nessa in the spotlight; Tariq teams up with Leah to bring down Lucious; Jamal has high hopes that working with Phillip will finally overcome his PTSD.
39	9	"A Furnace for Your Foe"	Sanaa Hamri	Ilene Chaiken & Matt Pyken	December 14, 2016	3AXP09	7.58
Cookie organizes a free park concert to strengthen Angelo's mass appeal as he works to win the mayoral bid. Meanwhile, Empire's assets are frozen by the FBI, forcing Lucious to ally with Shyne, unaware of his ulterior motives.
40	10	"Sound and Fury"	Craig Brewer	Eric Haywood & Carlito Rodriguez	March 22, 2017	3AXP10	7.95
Lucious announces a new album, "Inferno." He and Cookie go to war over control of the company, while Thirsty plants evidence to get Xavier fired for Becky. Jamal bonds with a fellow musician in rehab, Tory Ash, and the two slip out to record a new song. Andre and Shyne's plan to kill Lucious hits a snag when Nessa and Tiana start feuding. Lucious reappoints Anika as head of A&R and Cookie retaliates by going on a rampage at Empire; she and Lucious briefly make out before she leaves him.
41	11	"Play On"	Benny Boom	Story by : Malcolm Spellman; Teleplay by : Janeika James & Jasheika James	March 29, 2017	3AXP11	6.91
Lucious must deal with the increasing tension between Leah, Cookie, and Anika, which is compounded further when evidence surfaces suggesting that Tariq is planning to turn the latter into an informant. Andre and Shine meet with a Las Vegas club promoter to discuss doing business with Empire, but his abused girlfriend Giuliana kills him and reveals herself to be the real contact. Jamal informs D-Major that he will never be comfortable so long as he remains in the closet and Cookie struggles between her loyalty to Lucious and her chance to start fresh with Angelo.
42	12	"Strange Bedfellows"	Bille Woodruff	Matt Pyken & Attica Locke	April 5, 2017	3AXP12	6.35
Hakeem is annoyed to find that, despite his 21st birthday approaching, the rest of the family is too busy to celebrate. D-Major comes out of the closet in order to pursue a relationship with Jamal, only to find him sleeping with Philip. Anika contacts Lucious and returns home and he and Cookie threaten to let Leah kill her unless she turns on Tariq. At Hakeem's party, a new "friend" attacks a member of Tiana's entourage and Andre retaliates by stripping Hakeem of his XStream channel. Jamal warns Hakeem that he will never be taken seriously as an adult unless he starts behaving responsibly and Hakeem decides to spend the rest of the night with Bella.
43	13	"My Naked Villainy"	Cherien Dabis	Joshua Allen & Jamie Rosengard	April 12, 2017	3AXP13	6.59
Lucious' condition worsens and Thirsty arranges for in-house treatment. Jamal pushes ahead with a new single exploring the relationship between his parents, causing Cookie to reflect on the sacrifices she made for Lucious. Andre, Giuliana, and Shine seek a license for Empire's Vegas operation and Anika asks Cookie to raise Bella should something happen to her. A lawsuit is filed against Hakeem over the club incident and he rails against Thirsty's sleazy approach to fighting it. With Jamal's help, he makes a public apology. Andre calls a board meeting to get the Vegas expansion approved. Lucious tries to fire him for "insubordination," but everyone, including Cookie, supports the idea. Angelo wins his primary and Lucious, bitter from defeat, performs "You're So Beautiful" at the victory party. It is subsequently revealed that he has a past with Giuliana.
44	14	"Love Is a Smoke"	Tricia Brock	Diane Ademu-John & Cherien Dabis	April 26, 2017	3AXP14	6.31
Cookie catches Lucious playing a song he wrote for Giuliana during their affair and reveals that Angelo intends to propose to her. Giuliana and Andre prepare to meet with Vegas gaming commissioner Charlotte Frost to obtain their license. After listening to Tory's superior vocals on Nessa's song, Lucious decides to release it on Empire XStream. Giuliana confronts him and insists that he sign the deal; a flashback shows her husband stealing $10 million that Lucious had planned to use to expand Empire into Vegas years ago. Anika's wiretap enables the Lyons to inform the FBI of Tariq's illegal investigation, but Lucious gives him a bag of money before he goes into hiding. Cookie admits that she still loves Lucious and Angelo flies into a rage; Diana vows to destroy the Lyon family for hurting her son. Lucious successfully cuts Andre and Nessa out of the Vegas deal and the former plans to kill him.
45	15	"Civil Hands Unclean"	Howard Deutch	Ilene Chaiken & Carlito Rodriguez	May 3, 2017	3AXP15	5.60
Both Lucious and Jamal struggle to finish their albums. Snoop Dogg, as one of Empire's Vegas partners, persuades the former to put his son on Inferno, but Jamal refuses. Angelo has the fire marshal shut down Laviticus for "safety violations." Cookie, angered by Lucious' relationship with Giuliana, persuades Andre and Shine not to kill Lucious, but instead reap the profits from his Vegas expansion. Snoop informs Empire that his investment advisor, who told him to block the deal, is Ezekiel DuBois. Cookie tries to talk to Angelo, but it becomes clear he and Diana want to go to war with the Lyons. Jamal, seeing a chance to take the high road, offers Angelo a charitable donation in order to make peace. Hakeem composes a new song, "Elevated," to prove he can be a father. Lucious, Jamal, and Cookie agree to combine their efforts for Vegas, but the moment is shattered when Child Protective Services arrives to take Bella.
46	16	"Absent Child"	Millicent Shelton	Attica Locke & Malcolm Spellman	May 10, 2017	3AXP16	6.32
The Lyons confront the DuBois clan, but they deny having anything to do with what happened to Bella. Hakeem and Anika subsequently discover that their daughter has been removed from state custody and the Lyons realize that they must unite as a family to win her back. Lucious and Jamal continue to fight over the direction of their joint recording. Andre goes to kill Anika, but spares her so she can truly suffer. Hakeem's online followers stage a public demonstration against the DuBois family. Leah reminds Lucious that he can't be a good father since he isn't even a good person. She later brings him a box of pictures of his father and commends Lucious on bringing Jamal into the world. The two men reconcile and finally record their song together. Cookie has Shyne abduct and torture Angelo for Bella's location, but their interrogation fails. In turn, Diana reveals that she has adopted Bella as a DuBois.
47	17	"Toil & Trouble, Pt. 1"	Craig Brewer	Diane Ademu-John & Eric Haywood	May 17, 2017	3AXP17	6.14
At the grand opening of Laviticus Las Vegas, Cookie causes a disturbance and is thrown out. Hakeem becomes increasingly unstable and Lucious fires Thirsty at Giuliana's behest. Lucious's new PR man convinces him to delay Jamal's album. Cookie gathers her allies, but most of them desert her due to their conflicting interests. Lucious recruits Tariq to find Bella and the two begin to bond. Cookie sets up a heist of the casino to steal Giuliana's ledgers. The plan has a complication when Becky is forced to switch roles with Carol and Cookie must persuade her sister to finish executing it. The ledgers are presented to Commissioner Frost, but she is on Lucious' payroll and does not shut the project down as expected. Cookie then tries to persuade Jamal to launch his album solo, but it turns out that he has already decided to join Inferno instead. In turn, Andre conspires with his mother to sabotage the show, having learned Frost's secrets during their trysts. Tariq learns of the DuBois family's part in Bella's disappearance, but is fatally stabbed by Leah before he can inform Lucious.
48	18	"Toil & Trouble, Pt. 2"	Sanaa Hamri	Ilene Chaiken & Joshua Allen	May 24, 2017	3AXP18	6.94
As Lucious finishes preparations for Inferno, he has Leah locked up in the bathroom with Tariq's corpse. Cookie worries that Giuliana will come after her sons once she removes her from the equation. Admitting his fear that Bella will not be found, Lucious asks her to attend Inferno's opening in order to stabilize the family. Hakeem tails Anika to the DuBois household and offers to provide a favor in return for Bella's safety. Andre admits that he has dirt on Charlotte if she tries to interfere with his plans. Lucious calls Cookie and Giuliana together and has the latter thrown out, revealing that he and Jamal have already planned a rendition of "When Cookie Met Lucious" as a sign of faith, and Cookie has Shine call off a planned riot at Laviticus. Diana sets up her nephew Warren DuBois to take advantage of Jamal, while Leah frames Anika for Tariq's death and has her arrested. After reuniting with Cookie's childhood crush Barry, Lucious persuades Cookie to turn over complete control of Empire to Andre so they can retire. Andre tries to call off the hit on his dad's life when Andre finds out about Lucious and Cookie's plan, but Shine carries it out anyway, leaving Lucious in a coma. Upon waking up, he's revealed to have developed amnesia.

== Reception ==
=== Live + SD ratings ===
No. in series	No. in season	Episode	Air date	Time slot (EST)	Rating/Share (18–49)	Viewers (m)	18–49 Rank	Viewership rank	Drama rank
31	1	"Light in Darkness"	September 21, 2016	Wednesdays; 9:00 p.m.	4.2/13	10.87	3	12	4
32	2	"Sin That Amends"	September 28, 2016	Wednesdays; 9:00 p.m.	3.7/12	9.65	4	17	—N/a
33	3	"What Remains Is Bestial"	October 5, 2016	Wednesdays; 9:00 p.m.	3.4/11	9.25	5	13	—N/a
34	4	"Cupid Kills"	October 12, 2016	Wednesdays; 9:00 p.m.	3.5/12	9.27	4	15	—N/a
35	5	"One Before Another"	November 9, 2016	Wednesdays; 9:00 p.m.	2.9/9	8.15	—N/a	—N/a	—N/a
36	6	"Chimes at Midnight"	November 16, 2016	Wednesdays; 9:00 p.m.	3.1/10	8.39	—N/a	—N/a	—N/a
37	7	"What We May Be"	November 30, 2016	Wednesdays; 9:00 p.m.	2.9/9	7.84	—N/a	—N/a	—N/a
38	8	"The Unkindest Cut"	December 7, 2016	Wednesdays; 9:00 p.m.	2.5/8	7.00	—N/a	—N/a	—N/a
39	9	"A Furnace For Your Foe"	December 14, 2016	Wednesdays; 9:00 p.m.	2.7/9	7.58	—N/a	—N/a	—N/a
40	10	"Sound and Fury"	March 22, 2017	Wednesdays; 9:00 p.m.	2.8/10	7.95	2	11	—N/a
41	11	"Play On"	March 29, 2017	Wednesdays; 9:00 p.m.	2.4/8	6.91	4	18	—N/a
42	12	"Strange Bedfellows"	April 5, 2017	Wednesdays; 9:00 p.m.	2.2/8	6.35	—N/a	—N/a	—N/a
43	13	"My Naked Villainy"	April 12, 2017	Wednesdays; 9:00 p.m.	2.3/8	6.59	—N/a	—N/a	—N/a
44	14	"Love is a Smoke"	April 26, 2017	Wednesdays; 9:00 p.m.	2.1/8	6.31	—N/a	—N/a	—N/a
45	15	"Civil Hands Unclean"	May 3, 2017	Wednesdays; 9:00 p.m.	1.9/7	5.60	—N/a	—N/a	—N/a
46	16	"Absent Child"	May 10, 2017	Wednesdays; 9:00 p.m.	2.2/8	6.32	—N/a	—N/a	—N/a
47	17	"Toil & Trouble, Pt. 1"	May 17, 2017	Wednesdays; 9:00 p.m.	2.2/8	6.14	—N/a	—N/a	—N/a
48	18	"Toil & Trouble, Pt. 2"	May 24, 2017	Wednesdays; 9:00 p.m.	2.5/9	6.94	—N/a	—N/a	—N/a

=== Live + 7 Day (DVR) ratings ===
No. in ser	No. in season	Episode	Air date	Time slot (EST)	18–49 rating increase	Viewers (millions) increase	Total 18-49	Total viewers (millions)	Ref
31	1	"Light in Darkness"	September 21, 2016	Wednesdays; 9:00 p.m.	1.7	4.08	5.9	14.95	
32	2	"Sin That Amends"	September 28, 2016	Wednesdays; 9:00 p.m.	1.9	4.24	5.6	13.89	
33	3	"What Remains Is Bestial"	October 5, 2016	Wednesdays; 9:00 p.m.	1.9	4.34	5.3	13.59	
34	4	"Cupid Kills"	October 12, 2016	Wednesdays; 9:00 p.m.	1.5	3.77	5.0	13.03	
35	5	"One Before Another"	November 9, 2016	Wednesdays; 9:00 p.m.	1.6	3.83	4.5	11.98	
36	6	"Chimes at Midnight"	November 16, 2016	Wednesdays; 9:00 p.m.	1.5	3.64	4.6	12.03	
37	7	"What We May Be"	November 30, 2016	Wednesdays; 9:00 p.m.	1.5	3.49	4.4	11.33	
38	8	"The Unkindest Cut"	December 7, 2016	Wednesdays; 9:00 p.m.	1.5	3.66	4.0	10.66	
39	9	"A Furnace For Your Foe"	December 14, 2016	Wednesdays; 9:00 p.m.	1.4	3.47	4.1	11.04	
40	10	"Sound and Fury"	March 22, 2017	Wednesdays; 9:00 p.m.	1.7	3.63	4.5	11.58	
41	11	"Play On"	March 29, 2017	Wednesdays; 9:00 p.m.	1.4	3.06	3.8	9.97	—N/a
42	12	"Strange Bedfellows"	April 5, 2017	Wednesdays; 9:00 p.m.	1.3	2.94	3.5	9.29	—N/a
43	13	"My Naked Villainy"	April 12, 2017	Wednesdays; 9:00 p.m.	1.1	2.70	3.4	9.29	—N/a
44	14	"Love is a Smoke"	April 26, 2017	Wednesdays; 9:00 p.m.	—N/a	—N/a	—N/a	—N/a	—N/a
45	15	"Civil Hands Unclean"	May 3, 2017	Wednesdays; 9:00 p.m.	1.2	2.80	3.1	8.40	
46	16	"Absent Child"	May 10, 2017	Wednesdays; 9:00 p.m.	1.2	2.63	3.4	8.94	—N/a
47	17	"Toil & Trouble, Pt. 1"	May 17, 2017	Wednesdays; 9:00 p.m.	1.3	2.97	3.5	9.11	—N/a
48	18	"Toil & Trouble, Pt. 2"	May 24, 2017	Wednesdays; 9:00 p.m.	1.3	3.09	3.8	10.07	—N/a
