= Empire season 2 =

Empire
- Season 2
- DVD cover
- Starring: Terrence Howard; Taraji P. Henson; Bryshere Y. Gray; Jussie Smollett; Trai Byers; Grace Gealey; Kaitlin Doubleday; Gabourey Sidibe; Ta'Rhonda Jones; Serayah
- No. of episodes: 18

Release
- Original network: Fox
- Original release: September 23, 2015 – May 18, 2016

Season chronology
- ← Previous; Season 1 Next → Season 3

The second season of the American television drama series Empire premiered on September 23, 2015, in the United States on Fox. The season was ordered on January 17, 2015. The show is produced by 20th Century Fox Television, in association with Imagine Entertainment, Lee Daniels Entertainment, Danny Strong Productions and Little Chicken Inc. The showrunners for this season are Ilene Chaiken, Danny Strong and Lee Daniels. The season aired on Wednesday at 9:00 pm, the same slot as the previous season. The season concluded on May 18, 2016, and consisted of 18 episodes.

== Premise ==
The show centers on a hip hop music and entertainment company, Empire Entertainment, and the drama among the members of the founders' family as they fight for control of the company.

== Cast and characters ==
=== Main cast ===
- Taraji P. Henson as Cookie Lyon
- Terrence Howard as Lucious Lyon
- Bryshere Y. Gray as Hakeem Lyon
- Jussie Smollett as Jamal Lyon
- Trai Byers as Andre Lyon
- Grace Gealey as Anika Calhoun
- Kaitlin Doubleday as Rhonda Lyon
- Gabourey Sidibe as Becky Williams
- Ta'Rhonda Jones as Porsha Taylor
- Serayah as Tiana Brown

=== Recurring cast ===
- Bre-Z as Freda Gatz
- Shannon Brown as Young Dwight Walker
- AzMarie Livingston as Chicken
- Kelly Rowland as Leah Walker (in flashbacks)
- Leslie Uggams as Leah Walker
- Andre Royo as Thirsty Rawlings
- Jamila Velazquez as Laura Calleros
- Tyra Ferrell as Roxanne Ford
- Rafael de la Fuente as Michael Sanchez
- Yani Marin as Carmen
- Raquel Castro as Marisol
- Adam Rodriguez as Laz Delgado
- Charles Malik Whitfield as Reverend L.C. Pryce
- Adam Busch as Chase One
- Patrick Mulvey as Jago Locke
- Becky G as Valentina Galindo
- Tyler Ravelson as Tay-O
- Tasha Smith as Carol Holloway
- Veronika Bozeman as Veronica
- Mo McRae as J Poppa
- Vivica A. Fox as Candace Holloway
- Naomi Campbell as Camilla Marks-Whiteman
- Tobias Truvillion as Derek Major

=== Special guest stars ===
- Marisa Tomei as Mimi Whiteman
- Petey Pablo as Clyde
- Swizz Beatz as himself
- Al Sharpton as himself
- André Leon Talley as himself
- Don Lemon as himself
- DeRay Davis as Jermel
- Chris Rock as Frank Gathers
- Ludacris as Officer McKnight
- Sway Calloway as himself
- Pitbull as himself
- Timbaland as himself
- Ne-Yo as himself
- William Fichtner as Jamieson Hintrhop
- Funkmaster Flex as himself
- Rosie O'Donnell as Pepper O'Leary
- Jason Derulo as himself
- Joel Madden as himself
- Nicole Richie as herself
- Alicia Keys as Skye Summers
- Da Brat as Jezzy
- Xzibit as Leslie Shyne Johnson
- Siyah as himself

== Production ==
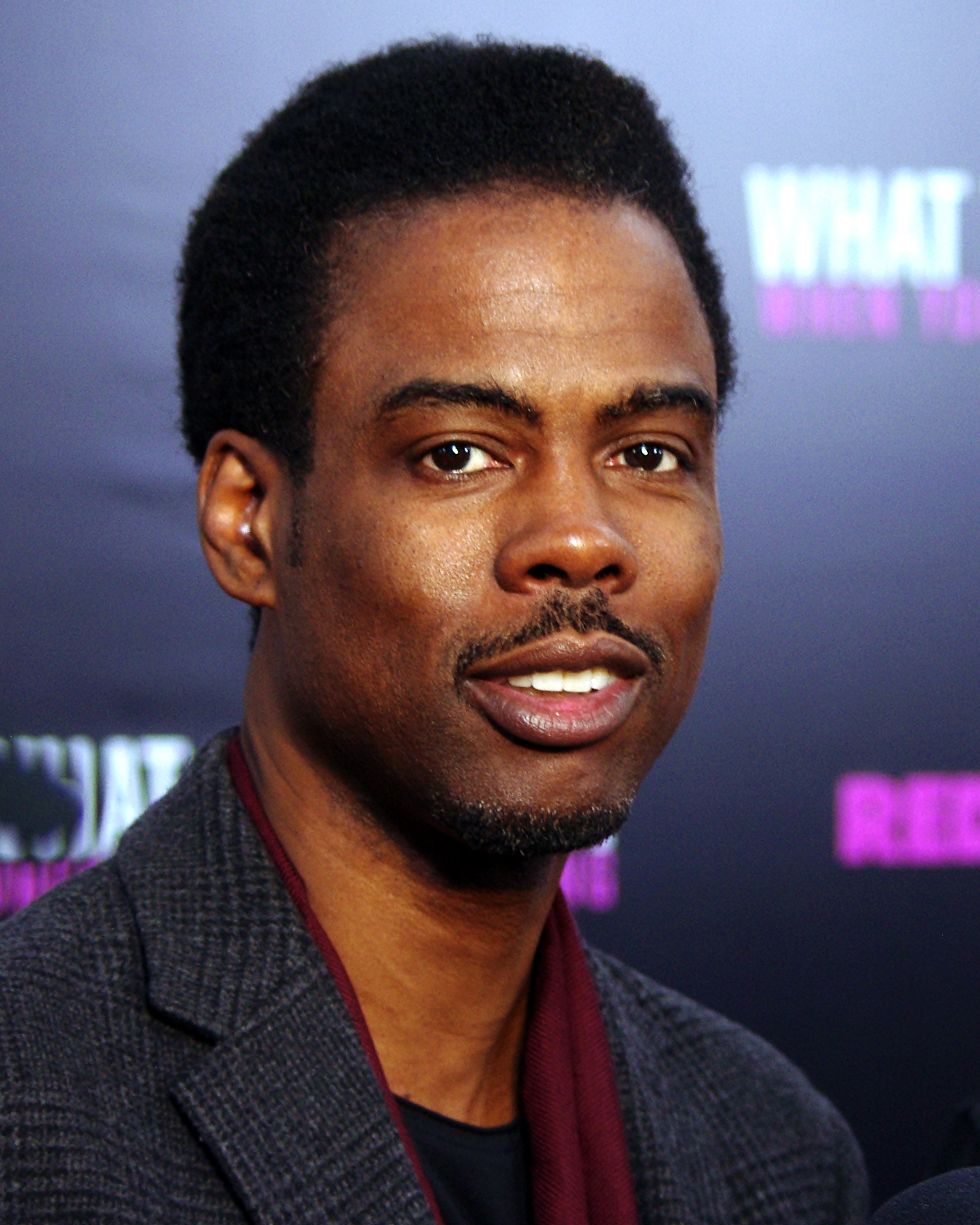
Chris Rock

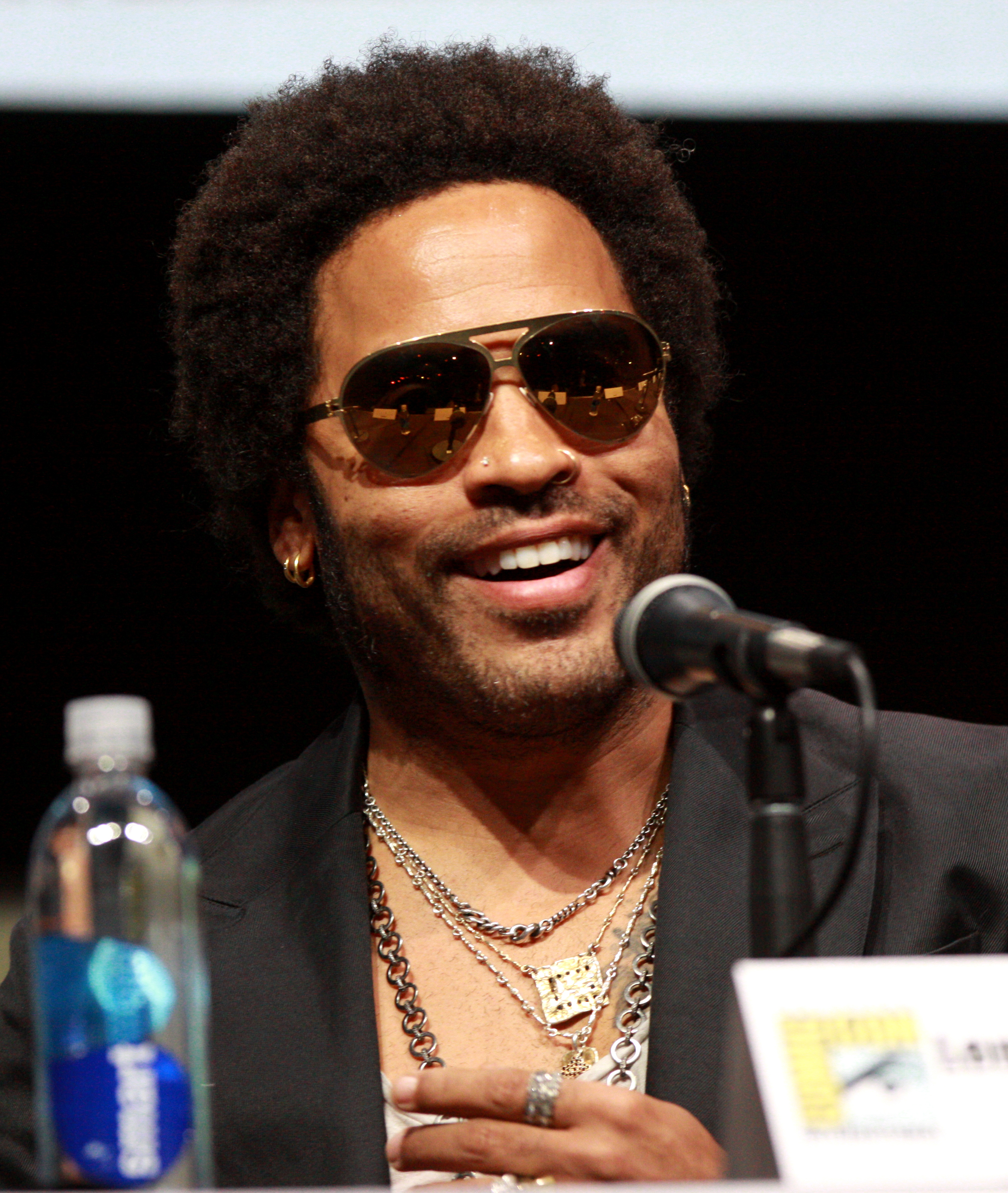
Lenny Kravitz

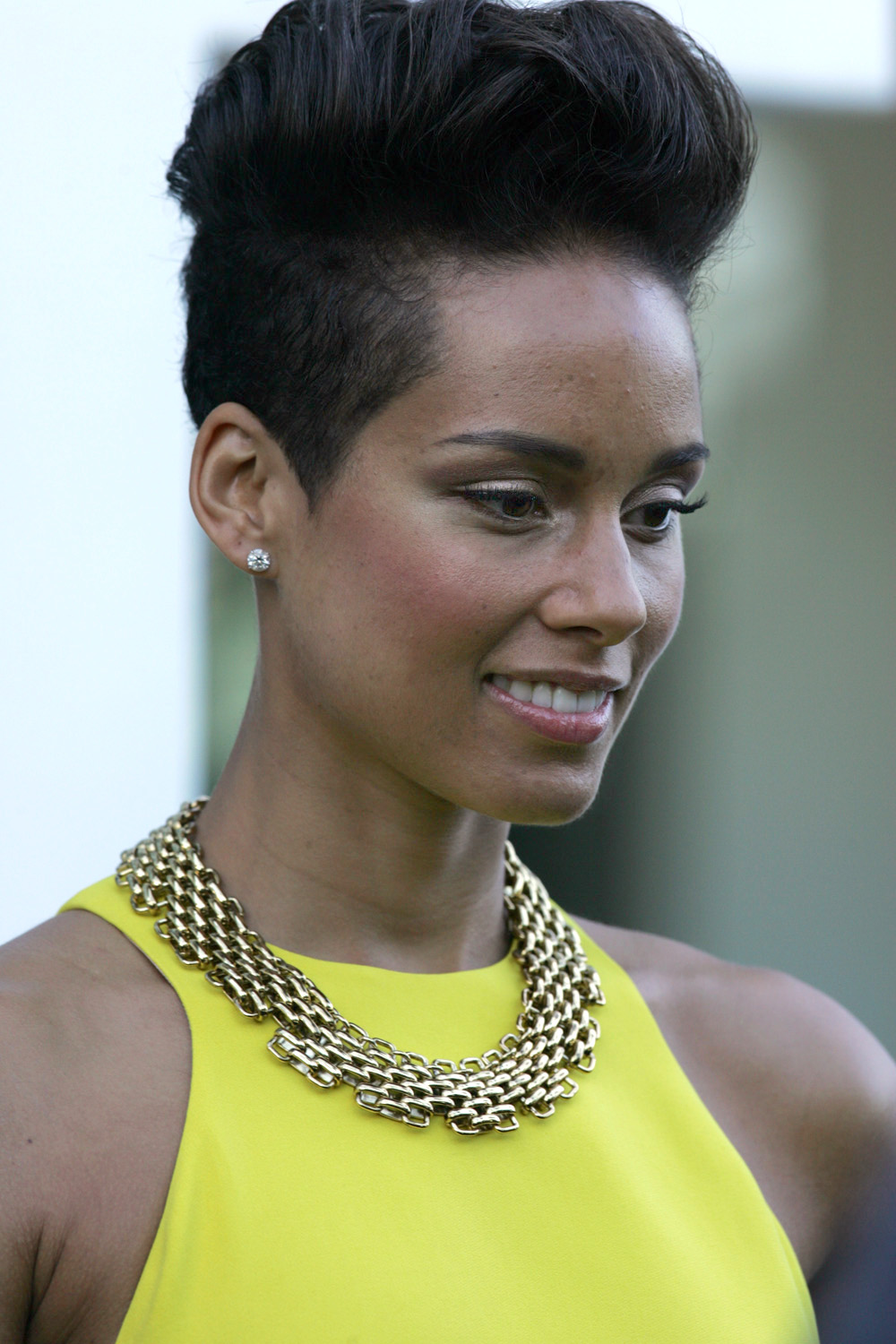
Alicia Keys

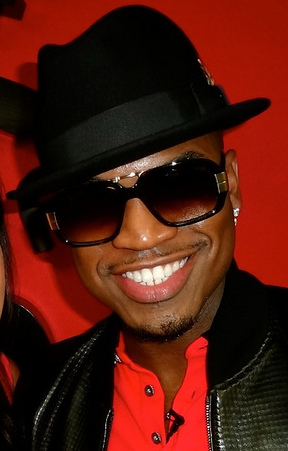
Ne-Yo

Empire was renewed for a second season on January 17, 2015, by Fox after only two episodes had aired. It was announced to contain 18 episodes, split into two parts, with ten episodes in the fall, and the remaining eight episodes after the Christmas break, beginning in January. Filming began on June 23, 2015, as confirmed by Fox, in addition to Chris Rock being spotted on set.

=== Casting ===
The second season had ten roles receiving star billing, with seven of them returning from the previous season, in addition to three characters upgraded from the first season. Terrence Howard will portray Lucious Lyon, a former drug dealer turned hip hop mogul and the CEO of Empire Entertainment who now is imprisoned. Taraji P. Henson will play Cookie Lyon, Lucious' outspoken ex-wife and mother of his three sons, who served 17 years in prison, and have now made a hostile takeover for Empire Entertainment with Anika, Andre and Hakeem. Lucious and Cookie have three sons: Andre Lyon, the eldest son of the Lyon family and CFO of Empire Entertainment who will be played by Trai Byers, and will deal with his wife killing Uncle Vernon in the previous season finale. Jussie Smollett will play Jamal Lyon, the middle son and "black sheep" of the Lyon family, a talented, gay singer-songwriter who has been given control over Empire from his father, Lucious. Bryshere Y. Gray will portray Hakeem Lyon, the fame-obsessed youngest son and Lucious' favorite child, who is a hip hop star on the rise and has been included in the hostile takeover with his mother, Anika and Andre.

Other series regulars returning are Grace Gealey, who will reprise her character Anika Calhoun, former head of Empire Entertainment A&R and Lucious' ex fiancée who has worked together with Cookie replace the acting board of directors at Empire. Kaitlin Doubleday will play Rhonda Lyon, Andre's power-hungry and money-obsessed wife who must deal with killing Uncle Vernon in order to protect Andre and her pregnancy, as revealed in the season one finale. In addition, Ta'Rhonda Jones, Gabourey Sidibe and Serayah McNeill were upgraded to series regulars after being billed as recurring characters during season one. They will be playing their respective roles as Porsha Taylor, personal assistant to Cookie, Becky Williams, executive assistant to Lucious at Empire Entertainment and Tiana Brown, a R&B-pop artist signed to Empire Entertainment, respectively.

Chris Rock, Lenny Kravitz and Alicia Keys were originally slated to guest star as themselves, but it was later revealed that Rock would play Frank Gathers. Adam Rodriguez will recur as Laz Delgado, a smooth promoter and a potential love interest for Cookie. On June 11, 2015, it was announced that the producers were casting the new breakout role of Betty Barz, a "moody, outspoken" teenage rapper who will first appear in the season premiere. Description of the character was that she was an African-American, "unapologetically butch," and something of a hometown hero in her "Brownsville-Never-Ran-Never-Will, Brooklyn" neighborhood.

On June 26, 2015, it was announced that Tyra Ferrell was cast as a lawyer who will be in contact with the Lyon family. It was announced on July 2, 2015, that Marisa Tomei was cast as Mimi Whiteman, a demanding venture capitalist who becomes embroiled in Lyon family drama. Kelly Rowland was reported on July 6, 2015, to have joined the cast as Lucious Lyon's mother in flashbacks. On July 17, 2015, TVLine reported that Andre Royo will join the cast as Thirsty Rawlings, a sharp lawyer who will defend Lucious. Bryshere Y. Gray was the one to announce that Becky G will join the cast in a guest-starring role in the second season as Valentina. It was announced on July 14, 2015, that Hakeem will have a new love interest whose name is Laura, a serious talented vocalist.

On August 3, 2015, it was revealed that Adam Busch has signed on for a multi-episode recurring arc, playing Chase One, a sexy, gifted, avant-garde gay artist who's doing a photo shoot, and is infatuated with his male star, while Jamila Velazquez, Raquel Castro and newcomer Yani Marin will play unconfirmed recurring roles. It was announced on August 5, 2015, that Mariah Carey will guest star in one of the upcoming episodes in a top-secret role. One day later, on August 6, 2015, it was also confirmed that Pitbull would appear as himself. Al Sharpton and Andre Leon Talley will appear as themselves, and will appear in the season premiere as they will show their support for the embattled music CEO at an epic, outdoor "Free Lucious" concert. On August 21, it was announced that Mo McRae was cast as J-Poppa, a love interest for Gabourey Sidibe's character Becky, which will appear in three episodes. On September 14, 2015, it was announced Rafael de la Fuente would return portraying the role of Michael in at least four episodes of the season. On November 5, Entertainment Weekly reported that Annie Ilonzeh had been cast in the role of TV reporter Harper Scott and would appear in the second half of the season.

== Episodes ==
No. overall	No. in season	Title	Directed by	Written by	Original release date	Prod. code	U.S. viewers (millions)
13	1	"The Devils Are Here"	Lee Daniels	Danny Strong & Ilene Chaiken	September 23, 2015	2AXP01	16.18
Three months after the arrest and incarceration of Empire Entertainment CEO, Lucious Lyon, Cookie arranges a star-studded #FreeLucious concert in his support, while scheming with Andre, Hakeem and Anika to get a potential investor, Mimi Whiteman (Marisa Tomei), to finalize the hostile takeover of Empire. While in federal lockup, Lucious tries to run Empire from inside, with the help of Jamal, who is getting closer to his ex-boyfriend Michael. Frank Gathers (Chris Rock) threatens Cookie after she turned him to the police, but Lucious successfully bribes Gathers's bodyguards to kill Gathers. The hostile takeover fails, when Jamal reveals to Cookie, Andre, Hakeem and Anika that Mimi instead is working with him and Lucious. With his new position, Jamal's relationship with his family is diminished, and is destroyed after the failed hostile takeover.
14	2	"Without a Country"	Dee Rees	Carlito Rodriguez	September 30, 2015	2AXP02	13.74
After Jamal chased them out of Empire, Cookie, Andre, Hakeem and Anika decide to start their own record label named Lyon Dynasty, but Cookie kicks out Anika after they disagree on how to lead it. Hakeem leaks his new album online rather than allowing Empire to release it and decides to cast a girl group for Lyon Dynasty to prove that he can be more than just an artist. He becomes romantically involved with his hot Latina lead singer Valentina Galindo (Becky G). Rhonda asks Jamal to take Andre back. Lucious has some altercations with Prison Officer McKnight (Ludacris), but his new lawyer Thirsty Rawlings helps him record a track in prison and also wins the bail hearing against Roxanne Ford.
15	3	"Fires of Heaven"	Craig Brewer	Attica Locke	October 7, 2015	2AXP03	13.10
Much to the dismay of prosecuting attorney Roxanne Ford (Tyra Ferrell), Lucious is freed on bail, but he's not allowed to enter Empire Entertainment. Lucious tries to reunite his family at a dinner, but Cookie doesn't forgive him and wants to pursue Lyon Dynasty. Lucious tries to ally with Anika, but she also wants to take revenge on him, so she teams up with Cookie and helps her crash a party for Lucious at Laviticus, where Cookie presents a performance by Hakeem, which is a huge success for Lyon Dynasty. Hakeem is producing his girl group Mirage à Trois and sleeping with the lead singer Valentina. When the girls keep fighting, Cookie takes over the training. Lucious wants to sign Frank's daughter Freda (Bre-Z) for Empire to get her out of the ghetto, but fails. Andre tells his parents that Rhonda is pregnant, but Lucious won't have him back at Empire. Lucious remembers his bipolar mother Leah Walker (Kelly Rowland). Lucious buys Apex Radio to control the music outlet and signs Valentina to Empire.
16	4	"Poor Yorick"	Danny Strong	Danny Strong	October 14, 2015	2AXP04	12.22
Under Roxanne's lead, the FBI raids Empire, Lucious’ house and Lyon Dynasty. Thirsty wants everyone to stick together until Vernon is found. Lucious and Mimi want the whole family to produce a video from Hakeem's leaked album, but Hakeem starts a fight with Jamal. Andre still wants to return to Empire and offers to clear the legal situation for Lucious. He wants to produce Vernon's body, but Rhonda and Andre are caught by Lucious and Thirsty, when they dig for the body. Lucious is relieved and takes Andre back. Roxanne has Cookie arrested and Cookie uses the situation to thwart Lucious’ Apex deal. Anika works for her return to Dynasty, but is rejected by Cookie.
17	5	"Be True"	Kevin Bray	Wendy Calhoun & Janeika James	October 21, 2015	2AXP05	12.28
As Vernon is discovered dead, all charges against Lucious are dropped and he returns to Empire. He makes Andre president of his resurrected old label, Gutter Life Records and signs Freda for it. At Dynasty, Cookie is planning a concert with Laz. Hakeem finds a new lead singer in Laura. Tiana is robbed and a Spanish speaking gang tries to extort money from Dynasty. Also, Thirsty hires someone to steal the master tapes from Dynasty, but Cookie catches them. Jamal is working with Ne-Yo on his album and plans a tour with him. Jamal's painter gets between him and Michael. For his upcoming baptism, Andre confesses to his family what he did wrong in the past. Finally, Hakeem is abducted.
18	6	"A High Hope for a Low Heaven"	Mario Van Peebles	Robert Munic	November 4, 2015	2AXP06	11.68
Hakeem escapes after the ransom drop and runs straight into Anika's arms. Traumatized by concussion symptoms, he tries to perform, but is met with difficulties. Later, when Cookie wants to hire his abductors for Lyon Dynasty's security, Hakeem draws a gun on them, but Cookie saves the situation. Jamal seeks help from Jamieson to avoid being marketed only as a gay artist. Andre tries to promote Christian hip hop in Gutterlife, but is called back by Lucious, who favors Freda even after she loses her temper and physically attacks a heckler in the crowd. Hakeem finds his confidence at the Big Apple Jam with Mirage a Trois and leaves Anika disappointed by the door. Cookie finally sleeps with Laz, but it's revealed he rolls with the same crew that abducted Hakeem.
19	7	"True Love Never"	Sylvain White	Ingrid Escajeda	November 11, 2015	2AXP07	11.20
Laz goes to Cookie's bed to talk her into hiring Big Heavy for protection, when she plans her Cookie's Cookout jam. Sir Huey invites Jamal for one of his popular living room sessions, but turns down Lucious’ request to invite Freda. Andre is sent to clear a gang injunction against Freda and blackmails deputy Mayor Alvarez. Lucious and Mimi want to merge Empire with Jago's streaming business Swiftstream. Cookie wants Hakeem to remove Laura as the lead singer of Mirage à Trois, but Hakeem keeps working on her performance. In the end, Lucious finds inspiration for his song with Freda in a terrible childhood memory.
20	8	"My Bad Parts"	Sanaa Hamri	Malcolm Spellman	November 18, 2015	2AXP08	11.34
Jago increases his price for Swiftstream, but Mimi insists on pulling through with the deal against Andre and Thirsty's wishes. Anika considers suicide, but discovers that she is pregnant with Hakeem's baby. When he tells her that he's in love with Laura, she decides not to tell him and abducts Laura. Jamal is working on a commercial gig with both his parents without them knowing. When they find out, they bet whose label will get his album. Freda starts a battle with Hakeem, which is really a fight pitting Empire against Dynasty. When they finally meet face to face, Hakeem drops the name Lyon. Cookie's sister Candace turns up about their other sister Carol.
21	9	"Sinned Against"	Paul McCrane	Eric Haywood	November 25, 2015	2AXP09	9.21
Cookie and Candace look for their drug-abusing sister Carol on the streets of Philadelphia. Anika is working on her plan to return to Hakeem. Lucious wants to become a major player in the streaming business. He makes a final offer to Hakeem to return to Empire and take the Lyon name back, which Hakeem turns down. Cookie also refuses to sign over her rights to their most valuable songs. In the end, Lucious decides to proceed without them at a great cost. Laz calls off his deal with the mobsters. When he wants to change the venue of the cookout concert, Lucious reveals that he found out that Laz is a member of the gang that abducted Hakeem. Lucious brings in Skye Summers (Alicia Keys) to work with Jamal and they grow close.
22	10	"Et Tu, Brute?"	Sanaa Hamri	Radha Blank	December 2, 2015	2AXP10	11.81
The nominations for the American Sound Awards are announced. Lucious is happy to see Jamal in love with Skye, but Jamal tells him he is still gay. Cookie visits her old prison for a benefit concert and she learns that her old cellmate Jezzy got a life sentence. When Lucious announces his new streaming service, Mimi presents her wife, Camilla Marks-Whiteman. Camilla tells Hakeem the reason for her sudden disappearance and that she wants him back so they can reign Empire together. Mimi calls a board vote to remove Lucious as CEO, and, with Hakeem's vote, Lucious is removed by the board. Mimi names Camilla as her proxy while she is away for cancer treatment. Tension rises when both Jamal and Lucious are nominated for song of the year. The same night, Rhonda is severely injured when she is pushed down the stairs by an unknown assailant in her and Andre's new house.
23	11	"Death Will Have His Day"	Danny Strong	Danny Strong	March 30, 2016	2AXP11	12.46
After the takeover vote, Lucious, Thirsty, and Andre go to the CEO's office to discuss their next move. Crying and distraught, Cookie confronts Hakeem. She attacks him, demanding he take his vote back. Rhonda, lying in a pool of blood, prays to God to save her baby. She throws her broken mobile phone against the door, thereby setting the alarm off and alerting the police. Now in charge, Camilla tries to get Lucious removed from the building, but they are interrupted by news about Rhonda. The family rushes to the hospital to rally around Rhonda and Andre. Rhonda tells Andre that she doesn't believe there is a God after the loss of their baby despite her prayers. Cookie and Lucious plot together to destroy Camilla from the inside. Camilla uses Empire to release a clothing line. Cookie tells Camilla that Hakeem is contracted to Lyon Dynasty and that she would need to buy the company to get him. Lucious has men from prison "visit" board members, convincing them to withdraw their bids for CEO. Hakeem puts himself forward as CEO. Jamieson visits Jamal, unhappy about his relationship with a woman (Skye Summers). As CEO, Hakeem agrees to give Lyon Dynasty autonomy within Empire and appoints Cookie as Empire's head of A&R. Lucious goes to work on his music at Lyon Dynasty's offices. Hakeem pledges himself to Laura and she gives him her virginity. Lucious tells Hakeem that he shot Bunky and that he did it for Empire. He gives Hakeem a gun and tells him that, if he doesn't kill Lucious then and there, he'll come after him.
24	12	"A Rose by Any Other Name"	Michael Engler	Ilene Chaiken	April 6, 2016	2AXP12	11.34
Jamieson tells Jamal that Lucious was the one who told him about his hookup with Skye. Jamal tells him that Lucious was trying to sabotage his ASA nomination. Camilla tells Hakeem that Mimi is leaving her Empire shares to her when she dies. Cookie tries to plan Tiana's tour, but Andre tells her that Camilla won't approve the budget. Cookie tells Tiana and she threatens to leave the company. Rhonda starts work at Camilla's fashion house and spies on her for the family. Cookie suggests to Camilla that Tiana should have Mirage a Trois (and therefore Laura) as the opening act on her tour. Camilla agrees to push the tour through as it will get rid Hakeem of Laura for months. Jamal performs, accusing Lucious of being 'inauthentic' and revealing that Lucious isn't his real name. Rhonda and Andre speak to a pastor and Andre accuses Rhonda of cheating. Rhonda is concerned that his paranoia means he's about to have another bipolar break and urges the pastor to get Andre to see a doctor. Hakeem agrees to help the family get Camilla out. He sleeps with her and gets her to reveal that she was only using Mimi. It's then revealed that he recorded the whole thing for Mimi to see what Camilla really thinks. Hakeem and Jamal show their support for Andre by writing him a song. Lucious visits Camilla, who has put something in Mimi's drink to kill her. He reveals that it was Hakeem that sent Mimi the tape. He threatens her with a gun and encourages her to drink the same poison she put in Mimi's drink. He leaves as she drinks it.
25	13	"The Tameness of a Wolf"	Paris Barclay	Attica Locke & Joshua Allen	April 13, 2016	2AXP13	10.11
A wake is held for Camilla. Hakeem announces that the fashion line will continue with Rhonda as Creative Director. Andre tells Rhonda he's sorry for accusing her of cheating and that his new medication is working. Lucious says Hakeem killed Camilla. Cookie tells the family that her first birthday since leaving prison is coming up and she wants them all there. Lucious plans his new music video with Cookie. He reveals how he chose his name (previously Dwight Walker). Mirage a Trois overruns their opening set and Tiana confronts Laura. Hakeem and Jamal head to a poor neighbourhood looking for Freda. They perform for and with people on the street. Jamal asks Freda to collaborate, but she turns him down, saying Lucious is like a father to her. Hakeem tries to smooth things over between Tiana and Laura. Freda gets upset with Lucious when she finds out that he's cut her section from the song. She goes to Jamal to work with him. Lucious reveals elements of his past, including his mother's abuse, to Cookie. She encourages him to tell his whole story in the video. Hakeem performs with Laura and Tiana on tour. Hakeem later proposes to Laura. The family gets together for Cookie's birthday. She shows them Lucious' video and it causes an argument between Andre and his father. Rhonda turns to Anika to vent her feelings. She briefly moves in with her. Cookie finds out that Frank Gathers is Freda's father.
26	14	"Time Shall Unfold"	Cherien Dabis	Ayanna Floyd Davis	April 20, 2016	2AXP14	9.56
Lucious releases his new music video, while doing everything he can to regain his position as CEO of Empire. Andre digs deeper and learns more about his grandmother's mental illness so he can try to understand his own. Meanwhile, Anika reveals that she is pregnant with Hakeem's baby to the Lyon-family, and Hakeem leads the big shareholder meeting.
27	15	"More Than Kin"	Sanaa Hamri	Eric Haywood & Malcolm Spellman	April 27, 2016	2AXP15	10.03
To try to convince the board of directors that he is fit to be CEO of Empire, Lucious hosts a fundraiser with Andre. Hakeem struggles with the decision about whether to be a part of his child's life or not. He also reveals the pregnancy to Laura, which leads her to end their engagement. Meanwhile, Cookie tries to fix her relationship with Anika for sake of the baby. After Cookie announces that the entire Lyon-family will be performing at the ASA awards, the board of directors promotes both Lucious and Cookie to co-CEO of Empire.
28	16	"The Lyon Who Cried Wolf"	Millicent Shelton	Joshua Allen	May 4, 2016	2AXP16	9.39
After Andre discovers a dark secret about his grandmother, Lucious' new music video takes a darker spin. Both Lucious and Andre clash about Andre's decision to release his grandmother from the psychiatric ward. Meanwhile, Jamal begins a relationship with one of the judges at the ASA awards, but discovers that the judge has not and won't come out as homosexual. Rhonda begins to suspect that her accident down the stairs wasn't an accident, and deduces that Anika was the one who pushed her.
29	17	"Rise by Sin"	Paul McCrane	Ayanna Floyd Davis & Jamie Rosengard	May 11, 2016	2AXP17	9.81
Hakeem feels the pressure of his underwhelming fiancée, Laura, as he struggles to find a place for her both in his family and his career. Jamal learns the truth about what happened to Freda's father from Cookie, prompting Jamal to warn Freda about Lucious's actions and ulterior motives. Rhonda confronts Anika about her accident, and if it was Anika who pushed her. At the ASA awards, Freda tries to shoot Lucious as revenge for him killing her father, but Jamal is shot in accident instead and is rushed to the hospital.
30	18	"Past Is Prologue"	Sanaa Hamri	Lee Daniels & Ilene Chaiken	May 18, 2016	2AXP18	10.88
After having a near-death experience, Jamal demands to stop making music until his family is done hurting each other. The police tracks Anika in order to convince her to testify against Lucious. At Hakeem and Laura's wedding, Shyne creates a fight, leading to Laura deciding to not be a part of Hakeem and his family. In order of Anika not testifying, Lucious and Anika get married. After the ceremony, Rhonda confronts Anika about her accident, resulting to a fight and one of them falls from the balcony with Andre watching and screaming in horror.

== Reception ==
=== Critical response ===
Early reviews for the second season of Empire indicate positive reviews. On the aggregator, Rotten Tomatoes, the season earned a 95% rating based on 39 reviews. It received a 77 out of 100 on the review aggregate website Metacritic based on 22 critics, indicating "generally favorable" reviews.

Empire season 2: Critical reception by episode
Season 2 (2015–16): Percentage of positive critics' reviews tracked by the website Rotten Tomatoes

=== Live + SD ratings ===
No. in series	No. in season	Episode	Air date	Time slot (EST)	Rating/Share (18–49)	Viewers (m)	18–49 Rank	Viewership rank	Drama rank
13	1	"The Devils Are Here"	September 23, 2015	Wednesdays; 9:00 p.m.	6.7/20	16.18	2	5	1
14	2	"Without a Country"	September 30, 2015	Wednesdays; 9:00 p.m.	5.5/17	13.74	3	5	1
15	3	"Fires of Heaven"	October 7, 2015	Wednesdays; 9:00 p.m.	5.1/15	13.10	2	7	1
16	4	"Poor Yorick"	October 14, 2015	Wednesdays; 9:00 p.m.	4.7/14	12.22	3	7	1
17	5	"Be True"	October 21, 2015	Wednesdays; 9:00 p.m.	4.8/15	12.28	3	8	1
18	6	"A High Hope For a Low Heaven"	November 4, 2015	Wednesdays; 9:00 p.m.	4.6/14	11.68	4	11	1
19	7	"True Love Never"	November 11, 2015	Wednesdays; 9:00 p.m.	4.2/13	11.20	3	9	1
20	8	"My Bad Parts"	November 18, 2015	Wednesdays; 9:00 p.m.	4.4/14	11.34	3	7	1
21	9	"Sinned Against"	November 25, 2015	Wednesdays; 9:00 p.m.	3.2/10	9.21	6	14	1
22	10	"Et Tu, Brute?"	December 2, 2015	Wednesdays; 9:00 p.m.	4.5/14	11.81	4	6	1
23	11	"Death Will Have His Day"	March 30, 2016	Wednesdays; 9:00 p.m.	4.8/15	12.46	1	2	1
24	12	"A Rose by Any Other Name"	April 6, 2016	Wednesdays; 9:00 p.m.	4.3/14	11.34	1	8	1
25	13	"The Tameness of a Wolf"	April 13, 2016	Wednesdays; 9:00 p.m.	3.8/12	10.11	—N/a	—N/a	—N/a
26	14	"Time Shall Unfold"	April 20, 2016	Wednesdays; 9:00 p.m.	3.7/12	9.56	—N/a	—N/a	—N/a
27	15	"More Than Kin"	April 27, 2016	Wednesdays; 9:00 p.m.	3.8/12	10.03	—N/a	—N/a	—N/a
28	16	"The Lyon Who Cried Wolf"	May 4, 2016	Wednesdays; 9:00 p.m.	3.6/12	9.39	—N/a	—N/a	—N/a
29	17	"Rise by Sin"	May 11, 2016	Wednesdays; 9:00 p.m.	3.7/12	9.81	—N/a	—N/a	—N/a
30	18	"Past Is Prologue"	May 18, 2016	Wednesdays; 9:00 p.m.	4.1/13	10.88	—N/a	—N/a	—N/a

=== Live + 7 Day (DVR) ratings ===
No. in series	No. in season	Episode	Air date	Time slot (EST)	18–49 rating increase	Viewers (millions) increase	Total 18-49	Total viewers (millions)	Ref
13	1	"The Devils Are Here"	September 23, 2015	Wednesdays; 9:00 p.m.	2.7	5.93	9.4	22.11	
14	2	"Without a Country"	September 30, 2015	Wednesdays; 9:00 p.m.	2.7	5.52	8.2	19.27	
15	3	"Fires of Heaven"	October 7, 2015	Wednesdays; 9:00 p.m.	2.3	5.14	7.4	18.24	
16	4	"Poor Yorick"	October 14, 2015	Wednesdays; 9:00 p.m.	2.4	5.15	7.1	17.37	
17	5	"Be True"	October 21, 2015	Wednesdays; 9:00 p.m.	2.4	5.07	7.2	17.35	
18	6	"A High Hope For a Low Heaven"	November 4, 2015	Wednesdays; 9:00 p.m.	2.4	4.96	7.0	16.64	
19	7	"True Love Never"	November 11, 2015	Wednesdays; 9:00 p.m.	2.2	4.60	6.4	15.80	
20	8	"My Bad Parts"	November 18, 2015	Wednesdays; 9:00 p.m.	2.1	4.71	6.5	16.05	
21	9	"Sinned Against"	November 25, 2015	Wednesdays; 9:00 p.m.	2.6	—N/a	5.8	—N/a	
22	10	"Et Tu, Brute?"	December 2, 2015	Wednesdays; 9:00 p.m.	2.1	4.62	6.6	16.44	
23	11	"Death Will Have His Day"	March 30, 2016	Wednesdays; 9:00 p.m.	1.7	4.35	6.5	16.75	
24	12	"A Rose by Any Other Name"	April 6, 2016	Wednesdays; 9:00 p.m.	2.0	4.40	6.3	15.74	
25	13	"The Tameness of a Wolf"	April 13, 2016	Wednesdays; 9:00 p.m.	1.9	3.96	5.7	14.07	
26	14	"Time Shall Unfold"	April 20, 2016	Wednesdays; 9:00 p.m.	2.0	4.16	5.7	13.71	
27	15	"More Than Kin"	April 27, 2016	Wednesdays; 9:00 p.m.	1.9	3.92	5.7	13.95	
28	16	"The Lyon Who Cried Wolf"	May 4, 2016	Wednesdays; 9:00 p.m.	1.8	3.92	5.4	13.31	
29	17	"Rise by Sin"	May 11, 2016	Wednesdays; 9:00 p.m.	2.1	4.41	5.8	14.22	
30	18	"Past Is Prologue"	May 18, 2016	Wednesdays; 9:00 p.m.	1.9	4.09	6.0	14.97	
