= Andre Lyon =

- Empire character
- Portrayed by: Trai Byers
- First appearance: "Pilot" (2015)
- Created by: Lee Daniels and Danny Strong
In-universe information
- Occupation: CEO of Empire; Former CFO of Empire Entertainment; Former President of EmpireXStream; Former President of Gutter Life Records; Former Broker at Stanton & Wallace
- Father: Lucious Lyon
- Mother: Cookie Lyon
- Stepmother: Anika Calhoun
- Brothers: Jamal Lyon; Hakeem Lyon
- Half-brothers: Jeff Kingsley
- Spouse: Rhonda Lyon (deceased); Teri Brooks
- Children: Walker Lyon
- Grandfathers: Joe Walker; John Holloway
- Grandmothers: Leah Walker; Renee Holloway
- Uncles: Tariq Cousins
- Aunts: Candace Holloway; Carol Holloway
- Nephews: Prince Lyon
- Nieces: Bella Lyon; Princess Lyon (deceased)
- First cousins: Luther Holloway; Keisha Holloway; Tanya Holloway; Brianna; Franklin
- Other relatives: Bunkie Williams (uncle) Jermel (cousin)

Andre Martin Lyon is a fictional character from the American musical drama Empire, on Fox. Portrayed by Trai Byers, Andre is the oldest son of hip-hop mogul Lucious (Terrence Howard) and his wife Cookie (Taraji P. Henson).

== Storylines ==
Andre, the college-educated executive in the company, is pitted against his two younger brothers, Hakeem Lyon (Bryshere Y. Gray) and Jamal (Jussie Smollett), for control of the family business after their father's developing illness. He is portrayed as the son with the most business acumen and unlike his younger siblings does not want to follow in the Lyon family's musical footsteps. This creates tensions with Lucious, who likes to push him aside.

He is afflicted with bipolar disorder, and is on a spiritual journey to find his identity. He is the one Lyon "son" who chooses business over singing. He was in an interracial relationship, married to scheming character Rhonda (played by Kaitlin Doubleday). This created further troubles with his father Lucious who disapproves of the relationship. Rhonda, who is pregnant, is pushed down the stairs by a mystery character in the mid-season finale of season 2, causing her to lose her unborn child. She is later killed in the season finale by Andre's stepmother Anika (Grace Byers), who pushes her from a 30-floor building. Andre avenges his wife's and unborn child's deaths in the season 4 finale when he spikes Anika's champagne. She hallucinates, seeing Rhonda's ghost, panics, and plunges through a glass ceiling to her death.

== Creation and development ==
=== Casting ===
On March 10, 2014, it was announced that Trai Byers known for his recurring roles on All My Children and 90210 had been cast in the role of Andre Lyon, the oldest son of Lucious (Terrence Howard) and Cookie Lyon (Taraji P. Henson) described as a "brilliant and compelling guy with a dark side." Byers had several auditions before he booked the role of Andre. When Lee Daniels and Danny Strong created the character of Andre, they agreed that he would have some sort of depression. Co-creator Danny Strong said Byers booked the role "partially by walking in and identifying Andre as Iago." Daniels likened Byers to Denzel Washington. "Pure genius" he said of the actor. "He's kind of legitimized [his family]" Byers said of his character Andre. It was his efforts that raised the company to the Fortune 500 level. Not only does he feel he is the brains behind their success, but as the oldest child, Andre feels like taking over the company is his birthright.

=== Characterization ===
Trai Byers described Andre "ivy league educated business man" who wants to help take his family's company to the "next level." As the oldest child, facing off with his two younger siblings for the company, Andre feels shut out and will do whatever it takes to get what he feels is rightfully his. According to Byers, Andre "dwells in the darker places of me, so I do a lot of shifting through emotions involving abandonment, guilt, and hurt." Andre also has suffered from depression. Much like Byers himself, Andre has a strong sense of loyalty. Though the creators always intended for Andre to be mentally ill, it was show runner Ilene Chaiken that pushed for Andre's condition to be more defined and they eventually agreed on bipolar disorder. Chaiken had previously worked on the ABC drama The Black Box which focused heavily on the disorder. While Chaiken and the creators wanted to explore the disorder again, "we also wanted to give Andre his own internal struggle, and that was the struggle that he presents with." While Byers is also a talented singer in his own right, Andre is not musical at all. Byers praised the decision to make Andre the "straight man in the middle of all of the pizzazz, the fame and fortune." "He is one of the most tragic characters, if not the most tragic character on this show" Byers said of Andre.

Byers actually studied the disorder through a family member who also has the disorder. "I feel much more committed knowing somebody and more responsible to him and others like him." Byers declared "Our Dancing Days" as the "beginning of Andre's story." Not only is Andre in the process of trying to make sure the IPO goes off without a hitch, he is off his medication and the news Lucious is dying from ALS pushes him to the brink. Byers explained "So it's all those different emotions, and the fact that he's bipolar, just trying to manage everything. It just kind of failed him." The actor described the scenes in which Andre breaks down in the shower after learning of Lucious' impending demise as "cathartic" for him as an actor because Andre had been sort of lingering in the background. In preparation for his portrayal of Andre's disorder, Byers said "I researched everything I could on paper." The actor also studied two separate cases of "manic episodes," both extremes, but total opposites; the first person was "very fast, so fast that he induced a stutter... Another one was really mellow, not depressed, though, still in a manic state, but just really, really slow." Byers wanted to find a balance for Andre between the two. Most significantly, during the filming of the movie Selma, Byers attended a family reunion in which he witnessed his uncle "talking to himself for an hour, almost in a different voice. It was very disturbing, coming from this brilliant man -- he's a genius outside of his disorder. It really caught me off guard, and later I found out that my character is bipolar as well, so that really served me."

=== Relationship with Rhonda ===
In his quest to rise to the top of the company, Andre has his wife Rhonda (Kaitlin Doubleday) by his side. Byers described the dynamic between the two as a "modern day Macbeth." While there is an initial belief that Rhonda has ill motives, Byers said "I don't think that she does." He agreed with the show creators' assessment that the relationship between Andre and Rhonda "is actually the most pure, fully functional [one] on the show." While the relationship can appear to be very "twisted," they are "ride or die." Rhonda only serves as an "instigator" to keep him motivated as he goes against his family. Andre sees a kindred spirit in Rhonda because "They both had to work for where they are" and they have a "similar background." Of the pairing, Byers said "They're actually the greatest love story on this show. They're the only two people who genuinely love each other and have each other's back through it all."After Rhonda faced a terrible death in Season 3, Andre was heart-broken and weak without her, because of his Bipolar Disorder, she returns to him in hallucinations.
