= Lucious Lyon =

- Empire character
- Portrayed by: Terrence Howard
- First appearance: "Pilot" (2015)
- Created by: Lee Daniels and Danny Strong
In-universe information
- Other names: Dwight Walker (birth name)
- Occupation: Partner in Lyon Family Management; Rapper; Record producer CEO and Chairman of the Board of Empire Enterprises
- Father: Joe Walker
- Mother: Leah Walker
- Half-brothers: Tariq Cousins
- Spouse: Cookie Lyon (divorced then remarried) Anika Calhoun (divorced)
- Sons: Jeff Kingsley; Andre Lyon; Jamal Lyon; Hakeem Lyon
- Grandsons: Prince Lyon; Walker Lyon
- Granddaughters: Bella Lyon; Princess Lyon (deceased)

Lucious Lyon (born Dwight Walker) is a fictional character from the Fox drama series Empire, portrayed by Terrence Howard. Lucious is the main protagonist and anti-hero of the series. Created by Lee Daniels and Danny Strong, Lucious is the founder and CEO of Empire Entertainment, a record company that he runs with his family. Realizing he will need a successor after he is diagnosed with ALS, Lucious pits his three sons: the college-educated executive Andre Lyon (Trai Byers), the talented and gay singer-songwriter Jamal (Jussie Smollett), and youngest, rapper Hakeem (Bryshere Y. Gray), against one another. The story has parallels to William Shakespeare's King Lear and James Goldman's The Lion in Winter, while the character of a rapper and music mogul is loosely based on several real-life figures, including rappers, record producers and politicians. Lyon is married to former wife, drug dealer, ex-con, and former partner of Empire Entertainment, Cookie Lyon (Taraji P. Henson).

== Creation and development ==
"The Jay Z story, which very much inspired Lucious Lyon, certain elements of Lucious Lyon, was that story. For me the story of people who have some sort of criminal past, or gangster past are not limited to black culture. ... Our goal is to tell a great story, and to do the best show we can. You can cross the line and just be totally inappropriate, but we're not doing that. ... You know, Joe Kennedy too, is another (person who rose to power from a criminal past)."

— Strong on specific inspirations for Lucious.

Creator Lee Daniels took influence from his own father in creating the character: "Lucious is a lot of my dad." Daniels also drew inspiration from several well respected men in the music industry including "Berry Gordy to Gamble and Huff to Jay Z to Puffy to Quincy Jones." Howard described himself as "megalomaniac" to which Lee Daniels responded, "The character's a megalomaniac." Howard replied in turn, "You need to be a megalomaniac to play a megalomaniac." When they started production, Howard thought to play Lucious with his "head down or be softhearted about something," but Daniels stated that "Lucious owns the world." Howard said the first few episodes are basically him doing an impersonation of Daniels. Howard also drew on inspiration from the 1972 film, The Godfather. "[Lucious] wants to be Michael Corleone, but sometimes he's stuck at being Sonny." Lucious does his best to "get rid of his emotions," Howard said. However, his emotions always sneak up on him and "keep him human." Howard had some admiration for his character. "I love that Lucious is unapologetic about who he is" and that he has a "backbone of pure determination." However, Howard said what rubs him the wrong way about Lucious is his "inability to connect with the people that really mean the most to him."

"The whole idea just flooded through my head: I’d do it like King Lear or The Lion in Winter. Make the main character like a dying king, and he’s got three sons."

— Danny Strong on the original concept for the series.

In an interview Howard said "for me to play a character that is Archie Bunker, or really the rest of America unmasked, Lucious says exactly how he feels when he feels it... And despite who's watching because he has five billion dollars and doesn't need anybody's approval." Howard is allowed to play someone who is "brutally, objectively and subjectively honest, in every circumstance."

=== Casting and portrayal ===
On February 19, 2014, it was announced that Academy Award-nominated actor Terrence Howard had been in cast in the role of Lucious Lyon, the head of Empire Entertainment, which he is about to take public. Howard had recently appeared in Lee Daniels and Danny Strong's 2013 film The Butler. On taking the role, Howard explained that there is no longer a "distinction" between the stage, film or television. He had done movies, but stated that "the work I find on this show is more challenging than 90 percent of the roles in film, and that's what you want as an artist." Those challenges helped Howard grow as an artist. Daniels admitted that he did have another actor besides Terrence Howard in mind for the role, and initially refused to disclose the actor's name. He later admitted that the other actor was Wesley Snipes, but Taraji P. Henson, who had already been in talks with the producers to play Cookie, suggested her former co-star Howard for the role. Otherwise, Henson would have declined her role. Howard and Henson worked together on the 2005 independent film, Hustle & Flow, for which Howard received his Academy Award nomination. "He had to be incredibly charming and charismatic and likable," Danny Strong said of any actor playing Lucious. While Henson recommended Howard because she thought he "classed up this whole hip-hop thing," Daniels had not initially been impressed with Howard. Daniels initially thought Howard was "too pretty," and accredited the 1998 film Spark with changing his mind about Howard as an actor. But Daniels was still hesitant; "I didn't think Terrence was interested in TV." However, Howard said he agreed to the role because he enjoyed working with Daniels on The Butler. "Anywhere you go, I'm going," Howard told Daniels. After Howard first read the script, he was very skeptical of the show and its portrayal of homosexuality. He initially referred to the script as "crap" and said that he wasn't sure how "ready the world was" to be shown "two black men kissing." Howard later admitted that he was "so wrong," saying that "[The homophobic environment]'s the environment I grew up in. That's the environment my friends grew up in. So this is a show aimed towards the black demographic. And do you really think that this is going to fly?" Howard even personally called Fox and told them, "'You need to take the kissing out, because this is going to stop, shut down the show."

In response to the controversy surrounding his casting and whether he should have been excluded from the project because of his alleged past, Howard said "I hope that nothing will take away from the truly special project we all worked so hard on. I hope people enjoy it because it has been such a wonderful experience working with this cast and Fox." Danny Strong admitted that he was not made aware of Howard's past until several months into the project. Strong said that while he did not condone Howard's alleged past behavior, "it is the polar opposite of what I've experienced with him, one-on-one and on set." Producer Brian Grazer put faith in Howard to "do right." Howard is a "guy that cares a lot... and he's been great with us on our sets, so I can only speak to that," Grazer continued. Fox executive Dana Walden described Howard as "a great partner." Walden explained that while it was the choice of the creators to hire Howard, the actor had impressed her and her co-chair Gary Newman. Walden also admitted that she and Newman were not made aware of the allegations until December 2014. By that time, Howard had been working with the network for nearly a year and showed no signs of trouble.

=== Personality ===
"I've never seen a character on prime-time television that was outright homophobic, that didn't hide it, that hated white people, that didn't hide it, that was a beast to his children and didn't hide it... I've never had the opportunity to do that."

— Howard on the character's appeal

==== Homophobia ====
Much like Lee Daniels' own father, Lucious is severely homophobic and extremely unapologetic about it. Daniels revealed that the decision to make Lucious homophobic stemmed from his experiences doing research for Precious. "Homophobia is rampant in the African American community" Daniels stated. "I wanted to blow the lid off more on homophobia in my community," Daniels continued. The openly gay Daniels recalled his father's point of view on his sexuality: "You're an African-American man, that's hard enough. You're going to throw gay on top of it? What are you doing? You have a choice. Do you really want to go through [life] like this?" "What we're doing is telling a little bit of the story of Lee growing up in that way," Terrence Howard said, referring to the scene in which Lucious throws his 4-year-old son Jamal in a trash bin when the boy puts on his mother's heels. That scene was based on Daniels' actual experience with his own father. Howard elaborated on his experience during the scene: "Watching Lee while we were shooting this — at one point, he had to look away because he was in tears, because he was facing it. His mother was also there on the set. It was cathartic for Lee." Howard continued, "Lee would not allow me to show any compassion in the scene. He reminded me how much Lucious loved little Jamal, but my need for the boy to be a strong man was greater than my need to show my love to him. That was a difficult scene." Danny Strong initially did not tell Daniels about the decision to incorporate that part of his life story into the series because he feared Daniels would reject the idea. Howard revealed that his own father was also terribly homophobic and it scared him too. But "that's what's taught in most [African-American and Latino] households", Howard explained. "What we're really trying to do is give people an opportunity to see what they're doing is painful," the actor continued. From Lucious' point of view, as a hip hop mogul, "He is supposed to be the epitome of a 'man' in the black community. He's raising three [strong] sons." Lucious feels that Jamal's homosexuality detracts from that powerful image.

When asked about the reason for the character's homophobia, show runner Ilene Chaiken said, "The why isn't something we've asked because I don't think there is a why." It just is. It could be "generational" and "cultural" or it could just be his personal beliefs, "but it's not surprising that it would be his point of view," Chaiken responded. "We don't talk about there being a specific incident in his life that made him homophobic," because usually there isn't one. According to Chaiken, creators Lee Daniels and Danny Strong viewed Lucious' homophobia as "[T]he most important storyline." They went on to state: "It’s central. We want to continue to play it, and play it with authenticity and roughness. We don’t want to soften it in any way." By the end of Season one, Lucious is able to put his homophobia aside for the greater good of Empire. Jussie Smollett said of Lucious' evolution and eventual acceptance of Jamal's sexuality, "[W]here you meet Jamal and Lucious in the pilot is not where Jamal and Lucious end up. There's a journey, a certain level of growth, and that's the truth of humanity." Smollett clarified that Lucious' evolution was not a complete reversal of his beliefs, but rather, a step in the right direction: "It's not to say that Lucious is going to be this incredible parent that supports his kid and goes and stands on the sidelines of gay marches, but it does mean that we're holding up a mirror and being like, "Lucious, if those are your points of view, as odd and jaded and bullshit as they are, if those are your points of view, the least you can do — the least you can do — is respect your child." Co-creator Danny Strong said of the character's growth, "Lucious has had the most profound arc of the season when it comes to his understanding and acceptance of his son's sexuality, and it was sort of one of the driving ideas of the season thematically with addressing homophobia in a way that was honest."

==== ALS diagnosis ====
When Lucious is diagnosed with ALS in the pilot, he starts to realize that he was not a great parent because he was so focused on "making the money." Howard said, "I'm approaching it from that place of missed time and trying desperately" to make use of the time he has left. While Howard does not have personal experience with the disease, he focused in on the "fear" that comes with such a disease. "There is a fear of what's about to happen" Howard said. The character's longevity immediately comes into question due to the diagnosis. However, Danny Strong refused to comment on how the disease would affect Lucious in future seasons. Strong danced around answering the question about the fatality of Lucious' diagnosis and said viewers would have to wait and see how the disease would affect Lucious. Though the doctor gives Lucious three years, and maybe even less time, Bustle estimated Lucious would be killed off around the end of season 3. However, the magazine noted that while the disease is incurable, Stephen Hawking who was diagnosed at the age of 21 was now 73 years old. Lucious starts showing symptoms much earlier than the doctor predicts which makes it seems like his life expectancy could be shorter. However, Bustle argued against the potential of the character's death sooner rather than later because Howard is the lead of the show. Dr. Aletha Maybank said "even though shows like Empire are filled with climatic levels of drama, it has elevated the conversation around a disease that has historically been showed behind the curtain by thrusting it into the lights of primetime." Ilene Chaiken discussed having Lucious come clean about his condition sooner rather than keeping the secret until the following season. In the Season one finale, Lucious discovers that he doesn't have ALS; rather, he has the treatable but still debilitating myasthenia gravis. Brian Moylan of The Guardian found Lucious' misdiagnosis to be a mistake on the part of the writers and creators, saying that it made the plot of the show "meaningless." He went on to say that the ALS diagnosis was a "brave" decision that the writers "snatched away." He claimed that the misdiagnosis "shows the audience that the bold choices this show makes have no real consequences. When they can find an easy way to brush off a serious disease such as ALS, what else will be swatted away when it becomes inconvenient to the writers? Is Andre's bipolar disorder going to be cured too?" However, co-creator Danny Strong revealed to The Hollywood Reporter that he had always intended for Lucious to have been misdiagnosed with ALS: "Lucious being misdiagnosed was in my original pitch. Lee and I pitched the show to four different networks, and it was always in the pitch that he was going to think he had ALS, but toward the end of the first season, he’s going to find out he was misdiagnosed. I’ve heard a few stories about that; my ex-girlfriend’s father was misdiagnosed with ALS, but also my grandfather had an autoimmune disease that crippled him but then it just reversed itself." Strong stated that the misdiagnosis was believable because "ALS is...a very hard disease to diagnose."

=== Relationships ===
According to Ilene Chaiken, Lucious is all about "what he wants in the moment." Cookie is "the one" for Lucious. Chaiken praised the chemistry between Howard and Henson but also gave credit to Daniels and Strong for creating the "extraordinary connection" between the two characters. Michael Slezak questioned whether Lucious and Cookie getting along would work in the long term because they are "fun adversaries." Chaiken said the writers were well aware that their reunion would come, but had a plan in place once it did. Chaiken said "we know where we're going and it's complicated." Howard explained that Lucious and Cookie have a mutual love for one another.

Howard insisted that Lucious loves Jamal and only wants the best for him. "So when he has this one son who's shown some homosexual tendencies as a child – [as a father] you're always kind of watchful, [wondering] why is Timmy over here playing with the dolls for so long?" Lucious identifies the "problem" early on and does what he deems necessary to get rid of those tendencies. "That's what father do. They take all of these kind of steps and precautions to make sure that any tendency that goes feminine, you try to nip that in the bud" Howard explained. Despite his disapproval over Jamal's sexuality, Lucious is able to give Jamal advice and some sort of comfort when his career starts taking off causing Jamal's boyfriend to leave him. "Lucious... talking to Jamal about how hard it is to be with an artist is a really authentic moment." It's also one of the first times the share a bonding moment. When Jamal finally stands up to Lucious, Howard said Lucious never tried to "crush" the "greatness that's in [Jamal]." Instead, "Lucious always pushed it." Howard explained and Lee Daniels agreed that had Lucious not been so harsh with his son at home, "Jamal may not have survived" where they grew up. Thanks to Lucious, "Jamal learned what the devil looked like." One doesn't grow from having "safe haven," Howard insisted.

== Storylines ==
Lucious Lyon was born Dwight Walker. He grew up in Philadelphia, Pennsylvania, and began selling drugs to support himself at age nine as an orphan, after his father was "killed" by the Nation of Islam, the details of which have yet to be revealed. He met his future wife, Loretha Holloway (whom he named Cookie), who helped him sell drugs to finance his rap music career. Cookie is eventually arrested and sentenced to prison. Lucious then divorces her and raises their three young sons with the help of Vernon Turner (Malik Yoba) and Cookie's cousin, Bunkie Williams (Antoine McKay). Eventually, Cookie and Lucious remarry later on in the series.

After becoming a successful rapper and singer, Lucious uses his drug money to build his own record company, Empire. After announcing his plans to take Empire public, Lucious is informed that he has ALS and is given 3 years to live. He soon becomes engaged to a younger woman and debutante named Anika Calhoun. His position in his company is threatened when Cookie returns from prison after having served her 17-year sentence, which was reduced due to her becoming an FBI informant (unbeknownst to Lucious). Cookie demands that Lucious give her half of Empire and the A&R position with the knowledge that he used drug money to finance the company. He refuses her demands, but nonetheless hires her on the company board and allows her to be the manager of their son Jamal, claiming that he "never wanted" him anyway due to his homosexuality. Lucious and Cookie pit Hakeem and Jamal against one another in an effort to prove who has more musical talent and to determine which one will inherit Empire.

Meanwhile, Lucious orders Bunkie to spy on Cookie. Bunkie refuses to do so and instead attempts to blackmail him, demanding US$3 million to pay off his gambling debts. Lucious kills Bunkie after meeting with him later near the city docks. He pretends to grieve at Bunkie's funeral, and has his oldest son Andre lie to the police about his location the night of the shooting.

Lucious gets Anika's father, a doctor, to sign a false statement of health concerning his ALS. He hires another doctor who secretly provides him with drugs from the black market, informing him that the drugs could possibly cure his ALS. The drugs only exacerbate his condition and he is rushed to the hospital. Once he recovers, he reveals his diagnosis to his family. Lucious and Cookie have a brief affair, which causes Anika to leave him and go to the company of his detested rival, Billy Berretti (Judd Nelson). Lucious discovers that Jamal has a possible daughter named Lola with his ex-wife Olivia (Raven-Symoné). He also hires security guards to better protect himself and his company. The head of security, Malcolm DeVeaux (Derek Luke), is a former Navy SEAL, whom Cookie flirts with to make Lucious jealous.

Despite tensions between Cookie and Lucious over their affair and subsequent breakup, they plan to release a collaborative family album called The Lucious Lyon Legacy Album. Cookie wants the album to feature Lucious, Jamal, and Hakeem as a supergroup, but Lucious decides to cancel it once Jamal comes out as gay to the public during a performance of his father's song, "You're So Beautiful." During a company board meeting, Andre tries to gain the position of interim CEO should Lucious become ill or die. When a tie-breaker is needed to decide if Andre gets the position, Lucious votes against his son, later explaining to him in private his disapproval of Andre's interracial marriage to Rhonda (Kaitlin Doubleday). Andre, in turn, stops taking his medication for his bipolar disorder and angrily lashes out at his father during a board meeting, accusing him of being a murderer. Lucious has Andre restrained and sedated, allowing Rhonda to decide to place her husband in psychiatric care.

Lucious attempts to restart his relationship with Cookie by hiring her to the now vacant A&R position, but she turns him down and sleeps with Malcolm. He offers Hakeem's older girlfriend, Camilla (Naomi Campbell) money to pay off her numerous debts in exchange for leaving the country and Hakeem, as he views her as a bad influence on his son. During a family dinner, Olivia's jealous boyfriend Reg breaks into Lucious' house and pulls a gun on Jamal and then Cookie when she intervenes. Lucious tells him that he is Lola's father and that he deserves to die, but Malcolm shoots Reg in the head before he can fire on Lucious.

Shortly after Reg's death, Lucious hosts a concert with Snoop Dogg and his son Hakeem, in which Hakeem repeatedly insults his father on stage for his role in getting Camilla to leave the country. Lucious punches his son in retaliation, but Hakeem sleeps with Anika to get revenge. Lucious discovers Cookie's relationship with Malcolm and reveals that he never actually hired her to the company board, and forces her out of her office. Lucious is told by his doctor that he was misdiagnosed with ALS and actually has MG (myasthenia gravis). While he is sleeping, Cookie hears Lucious confess to the murder of Bunkie, and she attempts to smother him with a pillow until Lucious nearly wakes. Overjoyed that he is not dying, Lucious decides to make amends with Hakeem and Andre. He finally recognizes Jamal's musical talent and realizes that he should lead Empire, making him the CEO. Lucious finally takes the company to the NYSE. In a celebration concert, Lucious is arrested for the murder of Bunkie. As he is escorted to jail, he believes Cookie informed the police of Bunkie's murder only to realize it was Vernon Turner.

== Reception ==
Much like his character, Howard is no stranger to controversy. Some disapproved of his hiring due to his past allegations of domestic violence and suggested that Howard be removed from the project. That same year, NBC ended its partnership with Bill Cosby due to the allegations of sexual assault against him. Clover Hope of The Muse viewed Lucious in the pilot as a "straight-up villain" that would have to overcome very "tragic flaws" to be deemed "likable." She continued, "The writers have so far succeeded in making [Lucious] one of the most compelling characters on television, and they're on the verge of pulling off another fete [sic]: making Terrence Howard likable." While the role comes off as a continuation of Howard's Hustle & Flow character, Jeff Jensen praised Howard's portrayal. "Helped by his doleful visage, tender voice, and soulful air, Howard keeps us caring about Lucious even as he reveals his monstrous shades."

Alessandra Stanley of The New York Times described Howard's portrayal as "silky and understated." Mark Blankenstop praised the writers for humanizing Lucious in "Our Dancing Days". Blankenstop said, "while the show doesn't forget this man is a villain – he did kill his best friend, remember – it also allows him to be a romantic who can actually love at least one person." He also praised Howard's portrayal of Lucious' love for Cookie. "I buy that Lucious really does feel things about [Cookie] that don't involve platinum plaques" he continued. "The very thing one hates about Lucious is the thing one likes most about him" Jozen Cummings from Billboard when she ranked Lucious at No. 3 out of 7 characters, based on likability.

Lucious has received comparisons to other TV antiheroes such as Tony Soprano, Walter White, Omar Little, and Don Draper. Scott Mendelson of Forbes said of the character, "Like the classic television anti-heroes of TV's so-called "golden age," Mr. Lyon operates as both the show's would-be hero and its most obvious villain. The character of Lucious Lyon arguably offers one of the first non-white variations on the now-standard television anti-hero." Lucious has been criticized for being a bad CEO and an even worse father. Zack O'Malley Greenburg said that Lucious' "intolerance" and "deep prejudice" inhibit him from making good decisions for the betterment of his company. Keertana Sastry of Bustle referred to Lucious as "a terrible boss" and "a terrible father," and thought that Cookie and Anika would be better suited to the CEO position. Craig D. Lindsey agreed, saying that Lucious is "a terrible father, a horrible businessman, and just a despicable, downright sociopathic person." Hettie Williams of The Huffington Post stated that Lucious is a "black caricature" who perpetuated the stereotype of the "black brute." She continued, "Lucious is a brute to his family in that he harshly places his young son Jamal into a trash can for his effeminate ways (Jamal tries on a dress in his youth) to teach him a lesson about how to "man-up;" refuses to attend a therapy session with his son Dre; and apparently...sleeps with his own daughter-in-law." However, Arienne Thompson disagreed, and found Lucious interesting as a "love-to-hate" character who embodied the best and worst qualities of all of TV's past anti-heroes and villains.

Jeff Jensen of Entertainment Weekly proclaimed that although "Lucious was forced to be the single parent, he did it badly, wounding his three sons in myriad ways while he chased worldly significance." Despite castigating Lucious for being a bad parent, Jensen thought that the character had depth to him due to Howard's impressive portrayal, saying that "Lucious may as well have been an absent dad, though in truth, he's just like too many so-called present fathers, distracted and remote. Howard effortlessly embodies the character's hypocrisies and imbues him with a palpable emotional life without sanding off his alienating edge."
