= Hakeem Lyon =

- Empire character
- Portrayed by: Bryshere Y. Gray
- First appearance: "Pilot" (2015)
- Last appearance: "Home is on the Way" (2020)
- Created by: Lee Daniels and Danny Strong
In-universe information
- Occupation: Rapper; Record producer Partner in Lyon Dynasty; Former CEO of Empire Entertainment; Artist Manager; Model
- Father: Lucious Lyon
- Mother: Cookie Lyon
- Brothers: Andre Lyon; Jamal Lyon; Jeff Kingsley
- Spouse: Tiana Brown; Maya Lyon
- Sons: Prince Lyon
- Daughters: Bella Lyon; Princess Lyon (deceased)
- Grandfathers: Joe Walker; John Holloway
- Grandmothers: Leah Walker; Renee Holloway
- Uncles: Tariq Cousins
- Aunts: Candace Holloway; Carol Holloway
- Nieces and nephews: Walker Lyon
- First cousins: Franklin; Brianna; Luther Holloway; Keisha Holloway; Tanya Holloway
- Other relatives: Bunkie Williams; Jermel; Rhonda Lyon

Hakeem Lyon is a fictional character from the American musical drama Empire on FOX, played by Bryshere Y. Gray. Hakeem, one of the main characters within the series, is the youngest and once-favorite son of hip-hop mogul Lucious (Terrence Howard) and his wife Cookie Lyon (Taraji P. Henson). Hakeem has the star quality to become a superstar like his father, but lacks the discipline.

== Storyline ==
=== Season 1 ===
Hakeem Lyon was born to Lucious and Cookie Lyon. He grew up in a Philadelphia ghetto with his father, brothers, his cousin Bunkie Williams, and father's friend Vernon Turner. He was only a baby when his mother was arrested; she was helping his father sell drugs to pay for his music career. Hakeem becomes a successful rapper signed to his father's record company, Empire Entertainment. Lucious announces plans to take the company to the NYSE, and he wants to groom Hakeem into his successor and the future CEO. However, Hakeem's arrogance, and lack of wisdom inhibit Lucious from immediately giving him the position. Due to his laziness, Hakeem incessantly asks his older brother Jamal (Jussie Smollett) to help him write and compose melodies for his songs. Although Hakeem gives his brother credit, Lucious refuses to acknowledge Jamal's musical talent. Once their mother, Cookie, is released from prison, she takes control of Jamal's career. Cookie and Lucious pit Jamal and Hakeem against one another in a competition to see who is more talented and who should be Empire's CEO, with both having upcoming album release dates. Hakeem detests Cookie and repeatedly insults her when she visits him.

Hakeem's haughtiness reaches new heights when he makes a viral video condemning Barack Obama and insulting white people. Hakeem begins dating an R&B singer named Tiana Brown (Serayah McNeill), but has a much older lover named Camilla Marks (Naomi Campbell) whom he sees on the side. Hakeem's oldest brother Andre (Trai Byers) has his wife Rhonda (Kaitlin Doubleday) leak a video of Tiana making out with a female model to the internet. Although initially frustrated and disinterested in continuing his relationship with his bisexual girlfriend, Hakeem decides to pretend that he and Tiana are a couple because Lucious and Cookie believe that the two will sell better together as an act than apart.

Andre sees some of Hakeem's gangster associates during a recording of his new music video "Drip Drop", and has them rob Jamal during one of his recording sessions while pinning the blame on Hakeem, though the robbery fails due to the intervention of the studio engineer. An angry Jamal believes that Hakeem set him up, and punches him in the stomach. The two later make amends after a duo performance during a concert hosted by Empire, after which Lucious informs his family that he has ALS. When Andre only expresses concern about the company's IPO and not his father, Hakeem indignantly tries to fight him, only to be restrained by Jamal. Hakeem begins to improve his relationship with Cookie, but she tries to end his relationship with Camilla because she views it as an unhealthy psychological desire to fill the void as a mother that she left behind when she was imprisoned.

Hakeem goes to church to pray for an improvement in Lucious' condition. Meanwhile, his father pays off his lover Camilla to leave the country and Hakeem behind because he believes that she is greedy and only out for Hakeem's money. When Hakeem discovers this, he insults his father during a concert. An angry and disappointed Lucious punches Hakeem, finally deeming him unworthy to inherit the company. Once Lucious gives the company to Jamal, Andre and Hakeem plot to overthrow him. Hakeem tries to sign to Billy Beretti's (Judd Nelson) company, but Jamal coerces Beretti into letting him out of his contract. Hakeem then sleeps with Lucious' ex-fiance Anika Calhoun (Grace Gealey), and he and Andre team with her and his mother to obtain Empire for themselves. Andre tells Hakeem about Lucious' murder of their cousin Bunkie, and the two inform the police. As Lucious is arrested, he realizes that Andre and Hakeem had a hand in his arrest.

=== Season 2 ===
After spoiling the hostile takeover attempt, Hakeem leaves the company with Cookie and Andre to start a new label—Lyon Dynasty. Hakeem hooks up with Valentina, (Becky G) -- the singer he has chosen to lead his girl group Mirage a Trois. With Jamal promising to bury his album, Hakeem leaks his music online and Jamal threatens to sue him sending Andre back to Empire. With Cookie's assistance, Hakeem quickly prepares the girls for their debut on Sway's radio show. Hakeem is furious when Lucious buys the radio station to keep Lyon Dynasty off the air and signs Valentina to Empire. When both Empire and Lyon Dynasty are investigated by the FBI due to Vernon's recent disappearance, Hakeem once again questions if Lucious killed Bunkie. To present a united front in public, Jamal and Hakeem team up to do a video shoot for "Ain't About The Money" during which Lucious tries to lure him back to Empire. Hakeem gets jealous of his father's constant praising of Jamal and slashes a painting of Jamal. The brothers then get into a fight and Hakeem walks off set. Hakeem later sees the talented singer Laura (Jamila Velazquez) performing and chooses her to replace Valentina. However, plans go awry when Laura rejects his romantic advances. Hakeem tracks her down and agrees to keep the relationship strictly professional. While working out, Hakeem is kidnapped. After the kidnapping and his rap battle against Freda Gatz, when Lucious' job as CEO and Chairman of Empire is jeopardized, Hakeem, spurned on by Camilla (back from England after marrying Mimi Whiteman), votes against Lucious, causing him to be kicked out of Empire. Being named CEO of Empire, he's urged by Camilla to get rid of his girlfriend Laura. He does by going to Lyon Dynasty while Mirage A Trois is rehearsing, drunk and insults the girls causing them to storm off. He realize he really does love Laura and reconciles with her, promising her to really be together. Later, Hakeem meets with Lucious at the spot where Lucious killed Bunkie, tells him he really killed his uncle, gives him a gun and gives him two options: kill him or spare him and next time he sees Hakeem, he'll do his best to kill him. He turns back and urges Hakeem to point the gun to his head and pull the trigger. Hakeem puts the gun to his head but throws the gun to the ground and walks away. Lucious warns him to watch his back telling him that he keeps his promises. He manages to get rid of Camilla from Empire but he also loses his spot as CEO when Lucious questions his vision at a conference. Anika tells the Lyons that she is pregnant and that Hakeem is the father. Hakeem decides that he wants to be involved in the child's upbringing. He also proposes to Laura and they have their wedding on the last episode but Laura ditches Hakeem at the altar when Shyne Johnson (Xzibit), an uninvited guest, starts a fight at the wedding.

=== Season 3 ===
In Season 3, Hakeem drunkenly goes to see Tiana after the failure of his wedding and states that it was always her he loved. He doesn't know that Anika is in the hospital giving birth to his daughter, Bella. Lucious, angry with Hakeem's behaviour, puts his name of the certificate as a legal guardian instead of Hakeem as he is married to Anika. Hakeem tries to get over his wedding humiliation by making music but is interrupted by Shyne and his sister, Nessa (Sierra McClain). Shyne offers to produce for Hakeem. Hakeem eventually agrees to this. He gets involved in a beef with another rapper, Gram (Romeo Miller), who starts dating Tiana and they kiss in front of a surprised Hakeem during a performance. Hakeem responds by recording a diss track to both of them. He begins to develop feelings for Nessa but she is interested in Andre. Hakeem eventually finds out about this from Lucious whilst performing with Jamal in his house on Empire XStream, their streaming service. Hakeem responds by dissing both Andre and Jamal on the live stream, resulting in a huge argument and setting a feud with Andre. Hakeem also begins to develop a bond with his daughter, Bella. When Tiana is set up by Andre and Nessa during a modelling session in which Nessa purposely burnt the dress she was supposed to wear, Hakeem figures out that Andre was responsible for this and confronts him. Nessa ends up taking Tiana's spot. Hakeem comforts Tiana afterwards and after their performance at the People's Ball, he kisses her and tells her he can't wait for her to meet Bella. They both start dating again and Hakeem supports Tiana after she gets in a fight with Nessa when they finish a performance at Leviticus. Hakeem celebrates his 21st birthday at Leviticus but it goes wrong when he lets in some strangers who helped him earlier. One of them assaults one of Tiana's friends and a fight breaks out. Andre shuts down Hakeem's XStream channel, telling him he needs to learn to take responsibilities while Jamal tells him he needs to "be a man." Tiana also chastises him for being selfish. He goes to Lucious to collect Bella so he can spend the rest of his birthday with her and this pleases Lucious. Hakeem, with encouragement from Jamal and Cookie, apologises to Tiana's friend via music through Jamal's XStream channel. Hakeem introduces Tiana to Bella and they both bond immediately. When Empire is to take residency in Las Vegas, Hakeem and Tiana have the last laugh over Andre and Nessa when Tory Ash (Rumer Willis) gets Nessa's spot. Whilst at home, Hakeem does an insightful piece on family via his XStream channel. This pleases Lucious and he decides to include Hakeem's name on Bella's certificate. However, Bella is taken away by social services, courtesy of Diana DuBois (Phylicia Rashad). This sends Hakeem into a panic. He follows Anika to the DuBois house and he finds Bella. However, Diana DuBois tells Hakeem that she wants something from him in return.

=== Season 4 ===
In Season 4, Hakeem is in a relationship with Tiana and raising his daughter, Bella. However, he has Diana DuBois coming round to visit Bella. He doesn't tell his family about this. When Anika is released, she comes to have access to Bella but Hakeem refuses, saying that Bella needs to get to know her again. Anika retaliates by applying for sole custody of Bella with support from Angelo (Taye Diggs). Hakeem gets in a panic and he finds out that Diana DuBois is behind the scheme. He assaults Angelo when he tries to see Diana and he decides to run away with Bella and Tiana to Cuba. However, Tiana tells Cookie and she meets Hakeem at the airport and tells him she can't lose him and that they will fight in court. The case goes to court and it looks like Hakeem is going to win the case but Diana turns up as a late witness and Hakeem's secret is exposed - when he met with Diana secretly, she had recorded everything he said about his family. He described Lucious as the devil, says he wishes Cookie was still in prison, calls Andre crazy and unstable and expresses unhappiness with Jamal's drug addiction. The judge awards full custody to Anika, devastating Hakeem. He splits up with Tiana after she crumbles in the witness stand. He spies on Anika and Angelo with Bella but is stopped by Thurston 'Thirsty' Rawlings (Andre Royo). After another argument with Tiana, resulting in her slapping him, Hakeem is given advice from Shyne about raising kids. He later goes to support Jamal, who is nursing a broken heart and they make music together. When the Lyons crash the Captain's Ball held by the DuBois, Hakeem and Jamal perform a song that disses Diana. After Diana's cover is blown by Cookie, Hakeem confronts Anika. He tells her that he is aware that when Bella was kidnapped, she knew where she was, making her accessory to the kidnapping and he has the videos as evidence. Anika begs Hakeem not to send her back to prison but Hakeem says he doesn't want Bella to grow up without her mom the way he did. He makes her sign the papers handing Bella back to him and he tells Anika that the fighting stops now and to never forget that he has the videos. Hakeem supports Andre, who was sectioned due to his relapse, and Jamal, who accidentally shot Angelo dead. He gets back with Tiana and proposes to her. However, she turns him down, saying that she needs no distractions from her career. She was influenced by Eddie Barker (Forest Whitaker), a family friend of the Lyons now turned enemy. After it is revealed that Andre almost killed Lucious, Hakeem stops talking to him. Hakeem, worried, prays when Cookie has a heart attack. Shyne encourages Hakeem to be a mentor to other artists and he meets Blake Sterling (Chet Hanks). Hakeem takes him under his wing whilst still being shut out by Tiana. When it is announced that Tiana has hit Number 1 on both the pop and R&B charts, Hakeem sets about releasing a new single to dominate the charts and he has a single launch with help from Andre, who he has reconciled with. At the party for his new single, Hakeem invites Tiana on stage to dance with him, and later the two have sex backstage. He looks to reconcile, but Tiana declines, putting more focus on her career. Hakeem is given an opportunity to act in a film alongside well known actress, Haven Quinn (Cassie Ventura). Unfortunately for Hakeem, the director is racist and ends up firing him after they have an argument. Haven, who was initially hostile to Hakeem, is impressed by him standing up to the director and makes it clear she likes him. Hakeem invites her to an Empire event and they kiss in front of Tiana. Hakeem and Blake fall out when Hakeem learns that Blake's father is a racist and a picture of Blake doing a Nazi salute is shown in public. They make up by the next episode when it turns out that Blake was forced to do that salute. Hakeem and Haven begin a casual relationship which ends when Haven tells him that she, too, was in a messy relationship and tells him to call her if he has any trouble again with Tiana. After the Lyons lose Empire, Tiana tracks down Hakeem and tells him that she is pregnant with his child. They reconcile but when they are about to leave the house, Blake's father shows up with a shotgun and fires 3 shots at Hakeem, Tiana and Blake.

=== Season 5 ===
In the season 5 premiere, it is revealed that Hakeem was shot, having lost a lung and is recovering. He has a son, Prince, with Tiana. Arguing with Tiana, Hakeem continues to spiral by getting drunk, getting into fights, and carrying guns. Hakeem is talked into performing to support Tiana. He performs to a backing track but he coughs during performance and he asks Blake to take over. Hakeem goes to Jamal's flat to stay for a bit and he pulls a gun on Jamal's new boyfriend, Kai. Hakeem chastises Jamal for abandoning him after he was shot. Hakeem's relationship with Andre has deteriorated due to Hakeem finding out Andre was responsible for Anika's death. When Hakeem turns up to Empire headquarters drunk, Cookie and Lucious intervene and let Hakeem stay with them. Hakeem works with Jamal, who teaches him breathing techniques to help him rap. Hakeem is released from Empire after he clashes with Jeff Kingsley (A.Z. Kelsey), who is trying to wipe out the Lyon's legacy. Hakeem dreams up a song which describes his feelings on the shooting amongst over things. He writes the lyrics and gives the song to Blake, who agrees to record it. However, Tiana gets involved on the track and Blake fails to tell her that Hakeem wrote the track. This becomes a problem later when the song is released and Hakeem finds out, resulting in a huge fight with Blake. Hakeem is removed from the club and he argues with Tiana. It is then revealed that Tiana had a miscarriage as she was expecting twins. Prince survived but the little girl, Princess, didn't, hence why Hakeem has been acting out. Hakeem and Tiana take a break from each other and Hakeem releases a diss track towards Blake. This causes concern amongst the other Lyons, most notably Cookie and Andre. Andre manages to get through to Hakeem, saying that he never meant to hurt him or Bella. Blake responds back with a diss of his own but Hakeem refuses to bite back, telling his fans that he is concentrating on his kids. However, Tiana tells him that he needs to squash the beef with Blake as his fans are threatening the kids. Hakeem confronts Blake about this but pulls his gun on him when Blake refuses to apologise for his role in the beef. Hakeem tells Blake to fix this. Tiana is furious with Hakeem and is about to leave when Bella rushes into the corridor holding Hakeem's gun towards herself. Hakeem sings a lullaby which settles Bella before taking the gun from her. Lucious speaks to Hakeem after the incident, telling him it's not too late for him to turn his life around for the better as he has not killed anyone. Hakeem talks to Tiana and they split up. Hakeem then squashes the beef with Blake and the three of them perform on stage. Hakeem is very unhappy when he finds out that Kingsley is his half brother. He clashes with Maya (Rhyon Nicole Brown), who is adding ballet to his performance but they manage to work it out. Hakeem is promoted to Creative Director at Empire and during the Empire trust tour he performs a tribute to Andre with Jamal as Andre has cancer. Hakeem gets jealous when Tiana takes an interest in Devon (Mario) but he spends most of his time with his kids. When Andre goes into hospital after suffering cardiac arrest, Hakeem is there at the hospital to support him. However, he is hostile to Kingsley, telling him he is not part of their family.

=== Season 6 ===
In the last season, Hakeem learns about the new Empire film and wants to play the lead role of Lucious Lyon. However Andre, who is the new CEO in Lucious' absence, refuses this as he wants an A-List star in the role. At the latest Empire showcase for NBA, Hakeem crashes Andre's announcement that he is the new CEO, stating that he will be cast as Lucious in the Empire film, whilst looking Andre in the eye. Afterwards, when Andre tells Hakeem he can't make decisions like that, Hakeem responds that Andre did the same with the CEO role so he should back him up on being a movie star. Andre eventually agrees and tells Hakeem that he better deliver. Hakeem is mainly seen shooting the film and he is also made Godfather of Andre and Teri's son, Walker. Lucious decides to get involved in the film shoot as he is unhappy with the vision. Hakeem's family life seems stable but his youngest son, Prince, has built a strong bond with Tiana's current boyfriend, Devon. Hakeem tries to be amicable with this but he then asks Andre to send Devon on tour. Andre refuses and he speaks to Hakeem, telling him that when he crashed Andre's CEO speech he saw a grown man who can handle his issues and he needed to find a way to work through them. Hakeem takes part in Empire Raw and shares his truth about his feelings of his son. He goes back to the set and he becomes increasingly unhappy with the script that Lucious has written, eventually causing a scene. He summons the family to a meeting on set and tells them he won't be taking part in further shooting unless the script is amended. This forces Lucious and Cookie to work together. They managed to give a more accurate script which pleases Hakeem and shooting of the film continues. Hakeem makes an appearance at the ASA's where he sees Tiana. Tiana is struggling at Bossy Media and questioning her choices in life, including Devon. Hakeem tells her that they'll work things out. Tiana tells Hakeem that she's missed him and they both leave the awards show in front of Devon. They go back to Tiana's to have sex but Tiana lies to Devon that they didn't. When they perform at an Empire trailer launch party, Hakeem wants to take things further but Tiana tells him that it was a mistake. Hakeem points out that it's only a mistake until the next time it happens and he walks away from her. Eventually, Hakeem manages to finish shooting the film and, needing to build hype and anticipation for the film, he works with Maya, setting up a story that he and his co-star are in a relationship. Maya, desperate to record music herself, requests Hakeem to help her record a track, which he does. Hakeem also gets a residency in Las Vegas and takes Maya with him. Unfortunately they both get very drunk and wake up in a hotel room legally married as they both took part in a shotgun wedding. Lucious and Cookie are furious with this and tell Hakeem and Maya to annul the marriage. Maya uses the Lyon name to her advantage and gets studio time over other artists and clout on social media. Hakeem is less thrilled about this, getting a hard time from a furious Tiana, and tries to get Maya to sign the annulment papers. Maya refuses as she wants Hakeem to help her with her music. Hakeem tells her that he will drop $100,000 from the agreement each day she doesn't sign it. At Becky's birthday party, Hakeem tries to talk to Tiana but she isn't interested and proceeds to perform a song about him and Maya. Maya manages to get Hakeem to talk to some film critics. The next day, Hakeem shows Maya the review and tells her he will wait until the movie premiere to get her to sign the annulment papers. Maya agrees with this and Hakeem helps her to perform at Bossy Fest. Hakeem and Maya share a kiss after Hakeem sticks up for Maya during an interview.

== Creation and development ==
"I created Hakeem to be a spoiled, young kid — like the kids that are out there who are not respecting their parents, not grateful for the things they have. That's what you see in Hakeem. He's a great musician, but he has a lot of flaws. He doesn't want to grind as hard for the things he really wants. He wants to be a boss so bad; he wants to be Jay Z and Kanye, but he doesn't want to work as hard for it. So that's his main flaw."

— Bryshere Y. Gray on the original concept for the series.

Gray said of the character's origins: "[the show's writer] Danny Strong influences the character. Kanye, Justin Bieber's antics—not Justin Bieber himself but his antics, snapping out to the world, doing rants—Hakeem embodies hip-hop and situations that occur in the hip-hop industry. He's that. You all get to see Chris Brown and you get to see the rappers and Jay Z, but you don't really get to see their lives. And that's what they're doing with Hakeem. They're going behind a wall that artists have up."

=== Casting and portrayal ===
"Fans just get to see artists like Hakeem performing on stages, driving in nice cars and flaunting their lifestyle, but fans don't get to really see their lives,” says Gray. “Their personalities are often swept under the rug and fans don't get to really experience who they are behind the scenes. Empire gives people a look at that other side, which is part of what made me want to be a part of the show."

— Gray on what attracted him to join the series.

On March 6, 2014, it was announced that Bryshere Y. Gray commonly known as rapper "Yazz The Greatest" had been cast in the role of Hakeem, the youngest son of Lucious (Terrence Howard) and Cookie Lyon (Taraji P. Henson). This was Gray's first acting gig. The role was initially to be played by actor, rapper and singer Quincy, the son of hip hop mogul, Sean "Diddy" Combs. However, Diddy did not agree with contractual obligations for the musical aspect of the series. Hakeem has the "swagger of a rising superstar" and is favored by Lucious to run the company. Gray found out about the audition from his manager, Charlie Mack and did a video audition for Lee Daniels. Gray then flew to Los Angeles where he screen tested with Howard and Henson. Gray said it was Howard who instructed him to dig deeper during the screen test that helped him land the role. The audition was Gray's very first acting experience opposite. He later sought formal training to prepare for the role. Gray revealed that he was close to being evicted when he finally booked the role of Hakeem. Gray took advice from actors Will Smith and Jamie Foxx in preparing for the role when they told him "if you feel like you're embarrassed, when you're acting, you're doing something perfect." Lee Daniels revealed that he patterned the character of Hakeem after his own 19-year-old son who like Hakeem, grew up very differently from his father because of Daniels' success. Like Hakeem, Daniels said "My son wouldn't know how to work right now, because I wanted him to have everything that I didn't have... . and now what?"

=== Personality ===
Bryshere Y. Gray revealed that he personally tried to avoid borrowing from the personalities of real life artists in his portrayal of Hakeem. Gray described Hakeem as "disrespectful, ruthless, spoiled and the 'heart throb' of the Lyon family." According to Gray, Hakeem is a lot like Lucious which is why he treats people so badly. "Hakeem doesn't really know how to respect females" because Lucious was his only example. "He really is a product of his habitat." However, "Hakeem doesn't have the ambition" that Lucious had. Because he's been handed everything, he doesn't feel like he has to work hard. "It's obvious he has mommy issues" the actor declared. When Hakeem is hurting, he acts out and usually does things he doesn't mean. Gray has said that his skills as a rapper gives his character "bravado." Gray said the role is "challenging" because Hakeem is "reckless" and he lacks the proper "guidance." Hakeem is a "spoiled, young brat and a bit of womanizer," Gray stated. Hakeem can learn from his mistakes, but he has to make them first. "He's a kid that's trying to grow" and he "doesn't think" before he speaks. Hakeem is the kind of kid that would "want to be president" if he got the chance, despite the fact that he doesn't have the experience; "he wants the glitz and the [glamour]" but he lacks the drive to get there. "I basically made Hakeem my own" Gray said on his portrayal of the character. "I had to make people uncomfortable and make people hate me" he continued. When asked who he modeled Hakeem after, Gray said "I packed rappers who are out today and tried to be honest." Aside from the musicality, "Hakeem is the total opposite of me," Gray said of his character. "He's the antithesis. He's so spoiled, he's so rich." When asked if he and could ever be friends with Hakeem, Gray responded, "Hakeem is an idiot. Yazz is a sweetheart." Gray made a conscious effort to keep Hakeem "honest" and with "no limits." Though Hakeem isn't "mature enough to have the company," he thinks he is entitled to it. Hakeem is "trying to get attention doing dumb things." However, Gray admitted that even he was surprised when Hakeem attacked President Barack Obama in the press.

Show runner Ilene Chaiken said the Hakeem "changes and grows the most" throughout season 2. Gray himself later revealed that Hakeem goes through a "transition" in the second season; "his mind is somewhere else." Chaiken said, Hakeem is "teetering on that precipice on being a man who's overcome a lot of childish, foolish behavior." Hakeem is "so strong" as long as Cookie is by his side, but he can't handle the pressure without her. Much like his father, Hakeem is "moved by talent" and "he really is a mogul in a way that neither of his brothers are." Hakeem is becoming the man Lucious initially envisioned him to be—but he has to earn it.

=== Relationships ===
Though Lucious favors Hakeem, Lucious blames Hakeem when he screws up failing to understand that he does not lead by example. While Hakeem wants to "satisfy Lucious" and live up to his expectations, he leans on Jamal for "advice -- especially on music." Hakeem and Jamal have a strong bond because as kids, Jamal was the only person Hakeem had. "Jamal is the person that Hakeem tells every secret to" because he knows Jamal won't judge him. Hakeem knows how good he and Jamal can be together. Throughout season 1, the duo are at odds for several reasons, but usually make up. With their new success, Gray said "It's about if they're going to stick together through the new adventures in their life." Because he had no contact with her for 17 years, Hakeem struggles to accept or even respect his mother. Cookie's return only reminds Hakeem of how "very hurt" he is. Their relationship is very confrontational, which is displayed in their very first scene in which he calls her out of her name, and she beats him with a broom. While the actor did not agree with Hakeem's treatment of his mother, he understood it. "A mother-and-son relationship is very important." And to miss out on that for 17 years only to have Cookie suddenly show up, Hakeem is "thrown off." Gray who grew up without his own father can identify with Hakeem's reaction because his father came back into his life after he landed the role of Hakeem. He has a lot "emotions" attached to his relationship with Cookie and it will take time for him to "let it go." Gray said that Hakeem is "emotionally and mentally hurt by [Cookie's absence] so he goes out and loves older women because he gets this type of affection that he hasn't gotten from his mother."

Hakeem feels a sense of "security" in his romance with the much older Camilla Marks, played by Naomi Campbell. She teaches him the things that Cookie couldn't. Though Hakeem "deeply" loves Camilla, he also takes an interest in label mate Tiana (Serayah McNeill). While he initially thinks their relationship is all fun and games, Hakeem starts to develop real feelings for her. However, when he realizes she might not feel the same way, it pushes his buttons. Gray said "Hakeem is all in his emotions" when he finds out Tiana has a "sidepiece" even though he is also seeing Camilla. "He's just being a little brat and not being a man and owning up to his actions. So... he's not talking to her. Tiana will be back." By season 2, Hakeem and Tiana's relationship has developed beyond their former romance. "Tiana's family now" as far as Hakeem is concerned. While there is still some underlying flirtation, "it's almost a sibling relationship" according to show runner Ilene Chaiken.

In the season 2 premiere, Hakeem starts a short lived romance with singer Valentina (Becky G) whom has he chosen as the lead singer of his girl group. In July 2015, E! Online reported that Hakeem would pursue talented singer Laura, "professionally and personally" throughout season 2. However, Laura is not interested in romance. Played by Jamila Velazquez, Laura "plays an important relationship role [as] a love interest for Hakeem." Laura is introduced in episode 2.04 when Hakeem who in looking for a new lead singer for his girl group witnesses her performance at a nightclub. "It amounts to a different experience and a different relationship for Hakeem" Chaiken said of the character's dynamic with Laura. However Hakeem and Anika end up having sex which is later shown that she is pregnant Hakeem's relationship with Laura is on the line and he proposes to her but their wedding is ruined and she leaves him. Hakeem's daughter Bella is born and he struggles to be good father even though Luscious has to be the legal father for publicity.

Hakeem reconciles with Tiana and very soon she is pregnant with his child. They marry and their son Prince is born.

== Reception ==
The character of Hakeem initially received mixed reactions from viewers and critics. Life+Times described Hakeem as a "love to hate" character. Jozen Cummings from Billboard declared Hakeem as the least likable character in the series. Cummings gave a scathing review of the character. "The hate for Hakeem knows no bounds. He doesn't have any redeemable qualities to speak of... . He may be fictional, but my disgust for him is very real." Complex magazine described Hakeem as the show's answer to "Tyga and Kid Ink." The character immediately stirs up controversy when he verbally attacks President Barack Obama in the press. Of the character's growth and acceptance of his mother, Los Angeles Times said "we can put the brooms away; he's finally acting his age, not his shoe size." Sadie Gennis of TV Guide said the character had taken Jamal's place as the "anchor" during the second season of the show. Gennis described Hakeem as the "constant amidst the chaos" of the season. He is "something real to hang onto." Gennis said her investment in Hakeem stemmed from the character's motives being so easy to understand and his intriguing dynamics with the other characters—specifically his parents' and brother Jamal. For the 2015 Teen Choice Awards, Gray was nominated for the "Choice TV: Breakout Star."
