= Cookie Lyon =

Fictional character

- Empire character
- Portrayed by: Taraji P. Henson (adult); Ajiona Alexus (as a teenager)
- First appearance: "Pilot" (2015)
- Last appearance: "Home is on the Way" (2020)
- Created by: Lee Daniels and Danny Strong
In-universe information
- Other names: Loretha Holloway, Lo Lo
- Occupation: Partner in Bossy Media; Co-Host of Tea Talk; Partner in Lyon Family Management; CEO of Empire Enterprises; Head of A&R at Empire Entertainment; Partner in Lyon Dynasty; Artist manager Record producer Drug dealer
- Father: John Holloway
- Mother: Renee Holloway
- Sisters: Candace Holloway; Carol Holloway
- Spouse: Lucious Lyon
- Sons: Andre Lyon; Jamal Lyon; Hakeem Lyon
- Grandsons: Prince Lyon; Walker Lyon
- Granddaughters: Bella Lyon; Princess Lyon
- Nieces and nephews: Luther Holloway; Keisha Holloway; Tanya Holloway; Brianna; Franklin
- First cousins: Bunkie Williams; Jermel Stubbs

Loretha "Cookie" Lyon (also Holloway) is a fictional character from the American musical drama Empire on Fox. Portrayed by Taraji P. Henson, Cookie is one of the main characters within the series, the queen bee and the wife of former drug dealer turned hip-hop mogul, Lucious Lyon (Terrence Howard). At the beginning of the series, she gets released from prison and strikes out to lay claim to half of their multimillion-dollar record label, which was initially funded by her drug money.

== Storylines ==
In the show's first episode, Cookie gets released from prison and immediately visits Jamal, her gay son (Jussie Smollett), the only member of the family that has kept in touch with her. Cookie then confronts Lucious (Terrence Howard) demanding half of the company, but he refuses and instead offers her a seven-figure income and living arrangements. She quickly realizes that her youngest son Hakeem (Bryshere Y. Gray) wants nothing to do with her. The oldest and most qualified businessman, Andre (Trai Byers), convinces Cookie to manage Jamal's career, which puts Jamal and Hakeem head to head, and results in Cookie and Lucious being at odds. Cookie is devastated when her cousin Bunkie is murdered, and while she was in bed with Lucious Lyon, Lucious confesses to the murder in his sleep.

During Season 1, Cookie also schemes to get Jamal to come out publicly during Hakeem's debut performance at Lucious' club. While that plan falls apart, Jamal ends up performing with Hakeem anyway. He later performs a song (You're so Beautiful) that reveals his sexuality to the public, infuriating Lucious. Cookie is later confronted by federal agents who want her to testify in front of a grand jury against the drug dealer that she ratted out to obtain her release who was Frank Gathers.

In Season 2, after the arrest of Lucious, she attempts a hostile takeover of Empire, but fails due to the investor siding with Lucious and Jamal, further damaging Jamal and Cookie's relationship. Frank Gathers then sends Jermel's severed head to Cookie and Carol. She tells Lucious to take care of it, which leads to Gathers being killed by his own goons. Cookie creates a new company with Hakeem named Lyon Dynasty (after the failed hostile takeover), which creates conflict with Lucious' Empire. After Jamal is shot by Freda Gatz, Frank Gathers' daughter, Cookie tries to fix the Lyon family's mistakes.

In Season 3, further conflict occurs in the Lyon family as Rhonda (Andre's wife) is killed, Andre gets into trouble and Shyne attempts to eliminate one of her sons. Her family then starts to fall apart after the arrival of Giluana, Lucious' former lover, as well as the removal of Bella Lyon by child services. During the finale of Season 3, Cookie and her family are together once again at the Laviticus nightclub in Las Vegas, where Jamal performs 'When Cookie Met Lucious'. Lucious is involved in a car explosion, which leaves him with amnesia.

In Season 4, Cookie takes over as CEO of Empire while Lucious is receiving 'help' from Nurse Claudia after the devastating explosion. Cookie has her suspicions when Claudia begins to inappropriately amuse Lucious, but eventually his memory returns and he kicks Claudia out of the house. Eventually, Cookie and Lucious get remarried in the Season 4 finale.

In the Season 5 premiere, it's revealed that two years passed since Cookie and Lucious lost Empire to Eddie Barker; the company is turned over to Jeff Kingsley after Eddie unexpectedly dies. Eventually, Lucious learns that Jeff is actually his son by Tracy Kingsley, a relationship he had before he married Cookie. In the Season 5 finale, Lucious has to temporarily leave New York City since he is wanted by the FBI. He asks Cookie to go with him, but she refuses and tells Lucious that he and Empire aren't good for her. She tells Lucious about the affair she had with Damon Cross and leaves, while Lucious gets on the helicopter and leaves New York City.

In the Season 6 premiere, it's learned that six months has passed since Cookie and Lucious separated. Cookie and Lucious get divorced again later in Season 6. They reunite in the series finale.

== Creation and development ==
Executive producer Lee Daniels revealed that Cookie was loosely based on the women in his life including his sister as well as Joan Collins' Dynasty character, Alexis Colby. Cookie will stop at nothing to get what she wants and she will cause "havoc" along the way. Henson said in an interview with TV Guide, that Cookie is the "hood version of Mama Rose from Gypsy."

=== Casting and portrayal ===
On February 26, 2014, it was announced that Taraji P. Henson, best known for her Academy Award-nominated performance in the 2008 film, The Curious Case of Benjamin Button and her most recent stint on the CBS drama, Person of Interest had been cast in the role of Cookie Lyon. After being released from a 17-year prison stint, Cookie challenges her husband Lucious for half Empire Entertainment, which was initially launched with money Cookie made from selling drugs. Knowing they would need well established actors to carry the series, executives at Fox reached out to Henson. Henson who had just ended her stint on Person of Interest in 2013 said she was done with television. However, Henson's manager sent her the script for Empire anyway. Lee Daniels said that Henson was who he "envisioned" when he first thought of the character. Daniels recalled that she actually wanted the title role in his 2009 film, Precious, a role that later went to Gabourey Sidibe, for which he said "she's out of her mind." Actress and comedian Mo'Nique who also co-starred in the film Precious as the mother of the title character (portrayed by Sidibe)—for which she won an Academy Award—revealed that Daniels had also offered her the role of Cookie, but the network rejected the idea accusing her of being "difficult."

Cookie "challenges me and I like that, I really do... I remember picking up the script and it scared the bejesus out of me. I was scared of Cookie," Henson explained. She knew the content would "piss off" a lot of viewers, but added, "isn't that what art is supposed to do?" "I know I'm going to have to probably dig into some ugly places in my life to bring the character to life," Henson remarked.

=== Personality ===
"It's this combination of Eleanor of Aquitaine and Mama Rose on crack meets Lee Daniels' sister."

— Danny Strong on Cookie

With the announcement of Henson's casting, the character of Cookie was described as a "total badass." "She's a lot of things," Henson said of her character in an interview with E!. Cookie is "very complicated and complex," the actress stated. Henson hailed Cookie as her "hero." In an interview with the Associated Press, she described Cookie as "the truth." Cookie is a "strong" woman who puts her "family first." Cookie "doesn't compromise at all? never herself, and never her truth." The actress admits that Cookie says what Henson might not have the guts to say. Cookie is a "tell-it-like-it-is everywoman." Henson described Cookie as "every actor's dream." "There's no mask" Henson said of Cookie. She is "raw nerve." Henson admitted that she can identify with Cookie's "mentality" because "I am from the 'hood.' It wasn't upper middle class; it was lower middle class." While Henson's life may not have been as bad as some of her peers, "I went to school with those kids. That's where I lived." She has compassion for a person like Cookie because "I was around it, so I can't judge" she said. Like Henson, who lost her son's father three years after giving birth, Cookie "did whatever she had to do" to support her family. Henson said viewers could identify with Cookie simply because "She's just real." Cookie is not "malicious" but she "shoots straight from the hip" and she's usually right. Henson admitted that she often has to "rein [Cookie] in" to keep from becoming "over the top" in her portrayal. As an actress, because Henson is so "uninhibited," the writers tend to write her "really big." Henson said "I make a conscious effort to sit on it" because if she always played it big, Cookie becomes a "stereotype and no one cares."

==== Fashion ====
A big part of the character is Cookie's fashion, which Henson has quite a lot of input in. "They've given me a lot of leeway. I love dressing up, as you can see, I love to play," said Henson. For the character, when Cookie first comes out of prison, "she is a bit dated" in her fashion sense, according to Henson. However, "You'll get to see her grow, not only in her art, but also in her style." Ayanna Prescod of Vibe Magazine commented, "Cookie is fierce, caring and extremely powerful. Her wardrobe is filled with fur, animal prints, golds and sparkles. After only one premiere show, women are asking how to look like Cookie." After her time in prison, Cookie needed to reclaim what she put into Empire. In order to "be a boss woman", Cookie sets up a wardrobe that allows her to "look like one." Empire costume designer Rita McGhee says of the character: "She is everywoman...She wears a suit, but it's a leopard suit and she wears it with some thigh-high boots. She owns the armor of her fashion. How shes feels inside matches her outside." McGhee also stated that Cookie's sense of fashion was inspired by Michelle Obama. Henson said of the character's immense and varied wardrobe, "It's like fashion on crack! It's high drama, I get to dress up and wear things I can't afford or that I just wouldn't buy because I'm cheap." Henson referred to Cookie as "an animal" out for what belongs to her, and stated that her love of fur and leopard prints relates to that theme.

== Reception ==
"On the Lee Daniels-created series, she operates as if she has something to prove with every step of her stilettos, every word that leaves her lips, and every silent but symbolic glare. The result is the kind of performance that makes critics and Hollywood insiders take notice."

— Kelley L. Carter on Henson's portrayal.

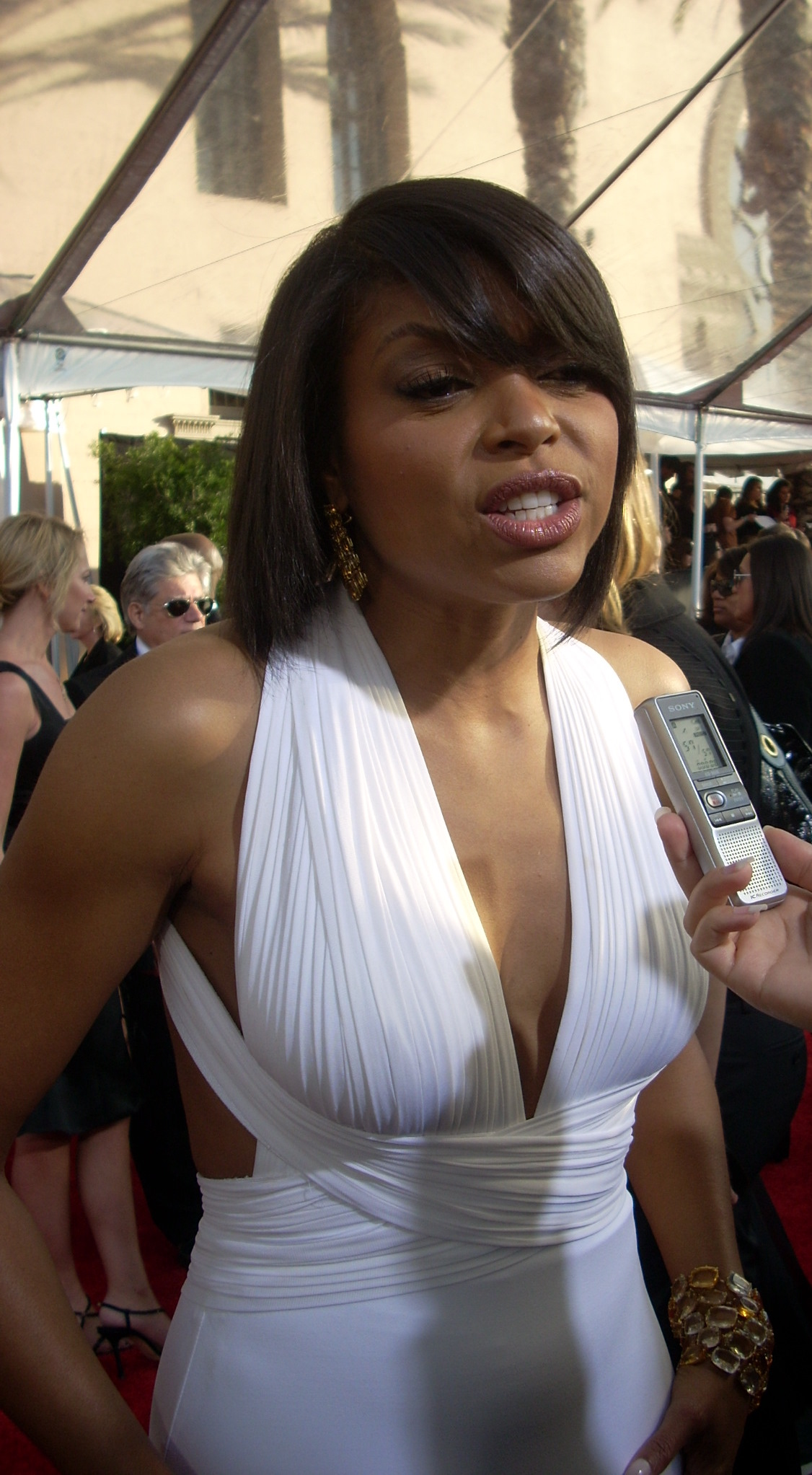
Henson has been nominated for two Primetime Emmy Awards for her performance.

The character of Cookie has been well received, and Henson was immediately praised for her portrayal. The character has drawn several comparisons to Alexis Carrington, the femme fatale famously played by Joan Collins on Aaron Spelling's 1980s prime time soap opera, Dynasty. Sandy Cohen described Cookie as the "heart" of the series. Tim Stack of Entertainment Weekly said that "In Henson's hands, Cookie becomes a hot-blooded mother lion in Louboutins, sure to be the show's most quoted character."

BuzzFeed said Henson "delivers one of her finest performances to date" as Cookie. While Henson usually shared the screen with big-name actors, Kelley L. Carter said Empire is "most certainly Henson's moment." Carter praised Henson's portrayal of Cookie as well as the actor's previous characters and said that "Her characters consistently feel like real people the audience actually knows, thanks to the measured way in which she portrays black women who've endured hardships." With Henson, Cookie doesn't become a "caricature" but instead is a "complicated woman who is far from one-dimensional," thanks to the "emotional sensitivity" that Henson brings to the character. "If Samuel L. Jackson had a baby with Bette Davis, it would be Taraji", says Jussie Smollett, who plays Henson's son Jamal in the series. He continued, "She's the perfect leading lady." Crime novelist Attica Locke joined the writing team after the Pilot and admitted that it was because of Cookie. "I felt like her character was unprecedented in that I'd never seen a woman or a mother like this on TV, so full of trouble and saying all the wrong things and yet you understand where she's coming from." TV Guide's Michael Logan said Henson played Cookie with "fire and fabulosity." Jamey Giddens from Daytime Confidential raved about Henson's portrayal of the "insurmountable" Cookie and said "just go ahead and hand the next six seasons worth of Outstanding Lead Actress in a Drama series Emmys to Henson." Giddens also appreciated the character's grit and joked, "Cookie is no Claire Huxtable." Dave Wiengand of The Seattle Times said Henson as Cookie is "biggest magnet in the cast. With her claw-like fake nails and exaggerated wigs, Cookie's a force to be reckoned with, both by the other characters and the actors who play them." Alyssa Rosenburg of The Washington Post said that Cookie is TV's "best new female character" of 2015. Jozen Cummings of The New York Post noted Cookie Lyon's similarities to real-life Sugar Hill Records co-founder Sylvia Robinson.

In May 2015, Henson won the Critics' Choice Award for Best Actress in a Drama Series for her portrayal of Cookie. She was also nominated for a Primetime Emmy Award for Lead Actress in a Drama Series, but lost to Viola Davis for her role in the ABC legal drama series How To Get Away With Murder. In 2016, Henson won the Golden Globe Award for Best Actress in a drama series. Later that year, Henson was nominated again for another Primetime Emmy Award for Lead Actress in a Drama Series, but lost to Tatiana Maslany for her role in the BBC America sci-fi drama series Orphan Black.
