= Pilot (Empire) =

- Empire episode
- Cookie Lyon visits her son, Jamal, after finishing her 17-year prison sentence.
- Episode no.: Season 1 Episode 1.
- Directed by: Lee Daniels
- Written by: Lee Daniels; Danny Strong
- Production code: 1AXP01
- Original air date: January 7, 2015

Guest appearances
- Gabourey Sidibe as Becky Williams; Rafael de la Fuente as Michael Sanchez; Antoine McKay as Marcus "Bunkie" Williams; Veronika Bozeman as Veronika

Episode chronology
← Previous —	Next → "The Outspoken King"
- Empire season 1

The pilot episode of the American musical drama television series Empire premiered on Fox on January 7, 2015. The show focuses on Lucious Lyon, the head of a record label who is diagnosed with ALS and given three years to live. While keeping his condition a secret, he decides to find a successor that will take over the company. Meanwhile, his ex-wife Cookie Lyon comes out of jail and demands a part of the company she founded. The episode was directed by Lee Daniels and written by Lee Daniels and Danny Strong. Over 12 original songs, produced by Timbaland, were featured in the episode.

The episode premiered to an audience of 9.90 million viewers, marking "the highest rated debut in three years" for the network. The episode was well received by critics, as well.

== Plot ==
Veronika Bozeman (Veronika Bozeman), a musical artist is in the middle of a recording take when her boss, Lucious (Terrence Howard), feels unsatisfied with Veronika's performance. Remembering his doctor's appointment, Lucious successfully encourages Veronika to perform better by making her remember her brother's tragic death; resulting in a better performance by Veronika. On a yacht, brothers Jamal (Jussie Smollett) and Hakeem (Bryshere Gray) perform a song during which they are observed by their brother, André (Trai Byers) and his wife (Kaitlin Doubleday). During a press conference, Lucious announces that he “is proud to announce that Empire Entertainment has filed to become a publicly traded company”. Afterwards, Lucious holds a family meeting with his sons and announces that he is up to find a successor for the company and each son will be considered.

Cookie Lyon (Taraji P. Henson), Lucious' ex-wife, comes out of jail after serving 17 years for drug dealing and visits her son, Jamal, where she finds him living with his boyfriend, Michael (Rafael de la Fuente). She goes on to visit her ex-husband and threatens him that she's up to get a part of the company she helped find. Lucious, worried, sends Cookie’s cousin and his assistant, Bunkie (Antoine McKay) to follow Cookie around and report everything she's doing to Lucious. Meanwhile, Cookie recognizes Jamal's talent and demands the right from Lucious to manage him. After Lucious refuses to give Jamal to Cookie, she threatens him that she’ll disclose to the SEC that the company was started with drug money; resulting in Lucious' application for an IPO being “effectively denied”. Having no other choice, Lucious accepts Cookie’s terms and hands out Jamal to Cookie commenting that he never wanted him because of his sexual orientation.

Bunkie visits Lucious’ home and demands $3,000,000 and threatens Lucious. Later, Lucious meets Bunkie in a secluded area under a bridge and kills him. The following day, on a yacht party, Lucious announces that both of his sons are releasing albums.

== Production ==
=== Background ===
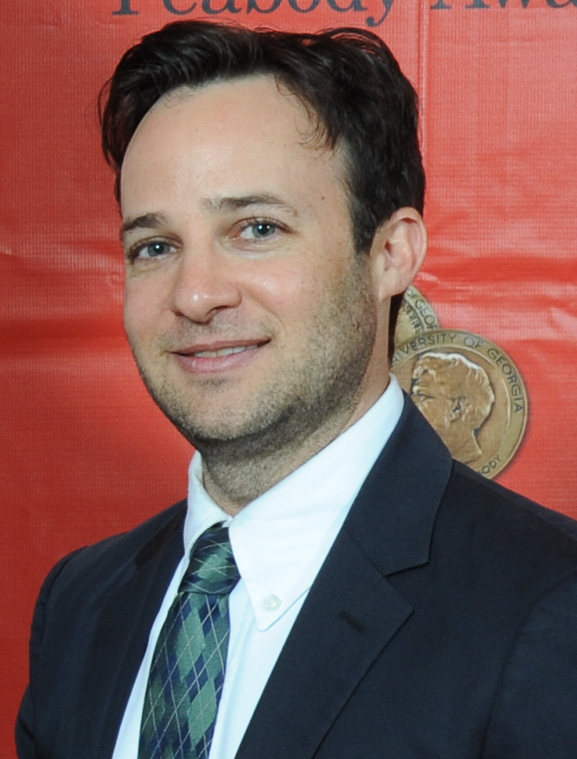
Danny Strong (pictured) got the idea for the show after hearing a Jay-Z song on the radio.

Danny Strong was driving home in his car, when a song by Jay-Z that was played on the radio inspired him to think about the “hip hop empire”. Strong pitched the idea to executive producer Lee Daniels, originally as a film project. Daniels suggested that “it’s a television series”. The duo filmed the pilot episode in March 2014 and pitched it to Fox. Fox responded positively to the episode and picked up the series on May 6, 2014.

=== Casting ===
Terrence Howard's lead role was announced on February 19, 2014. Shortly afterwards, Taraji P. Henson was announced as the female lead and Jussie Smollett was announced in a starring role. On March 10, 2014 Gabourey Sidibe was announced in a recurring role, having previously worked with Daniels on Precious. Grace Gealey and Trai Byers were announced in regular roles, and shortly afterwards Bryshere Gray and Malik Yoba were announced in starring roles. A few months before the season premiere, singer Courtney Love was set to make a special appearance and model Naomi Campbell was also cast in a recurring role.

=== Music ===
After casting his roles, Daniels focused on the music. Having little to no knowledge about the current music trends, Daniels turned to his children for advice. His son and his daughter urged him to hire Timbaland, known for working with artists like Missy Elliott, Madonna, Brandy, Justin Timberlake, Jay-Z, Nelly Furtado and Aaliyah. Timbaland eventually agreed to work on the project and shortly after he started working with the writers of the show. Eventually, 12 songs were produced for the pilot out of which two were included in the season's soundtrack.

== Reception ==
=== Ratings ===
The series debut was watched by 9.90 million viewers, marking the highest debut for a television series in three years on the network.

=== Critical reception ===
The episode was well received by critics. The A.V. Club's Joshua Alston gave the episode a rating of A− stating "there is no unused space, there are only new places for Cookie to prop her feet up". He went on to praise Henson's character stating "my money’s on Cookie". Max Nicholson from IGN called the episode "[a] high end family feud" and praised the show for the "dynamics between the characters" and the music stating "the songs range from R&B pop to straight freestyle rap, and all of it, in my opinion, is really well-executed". He gave the episode a 7.9 out of 10 rating concluding that the "series premiere offers a promising start to Fox's new music-themed drama". Tim Goodman from The Hollywood Reporter liked the episode concluding that "despite the flaws, [the episode] is entertaining as hell with a strong story base and great music".

== Accolades ==
Ceremony	Category	Recipient(s)	Result
67th Primetime Emmy Awards	Outstanding Lead Actress in a Drama Series	Taraji P. Henson	Nominated
67th Primetime Emmy Awards	Outstanding Costumes for a Contemporary Series, Limited Series, or Movie	Eileen McCahill, Paolo Nieddu	Nominated
