= Yazz the Greatest =

American actor and rapper

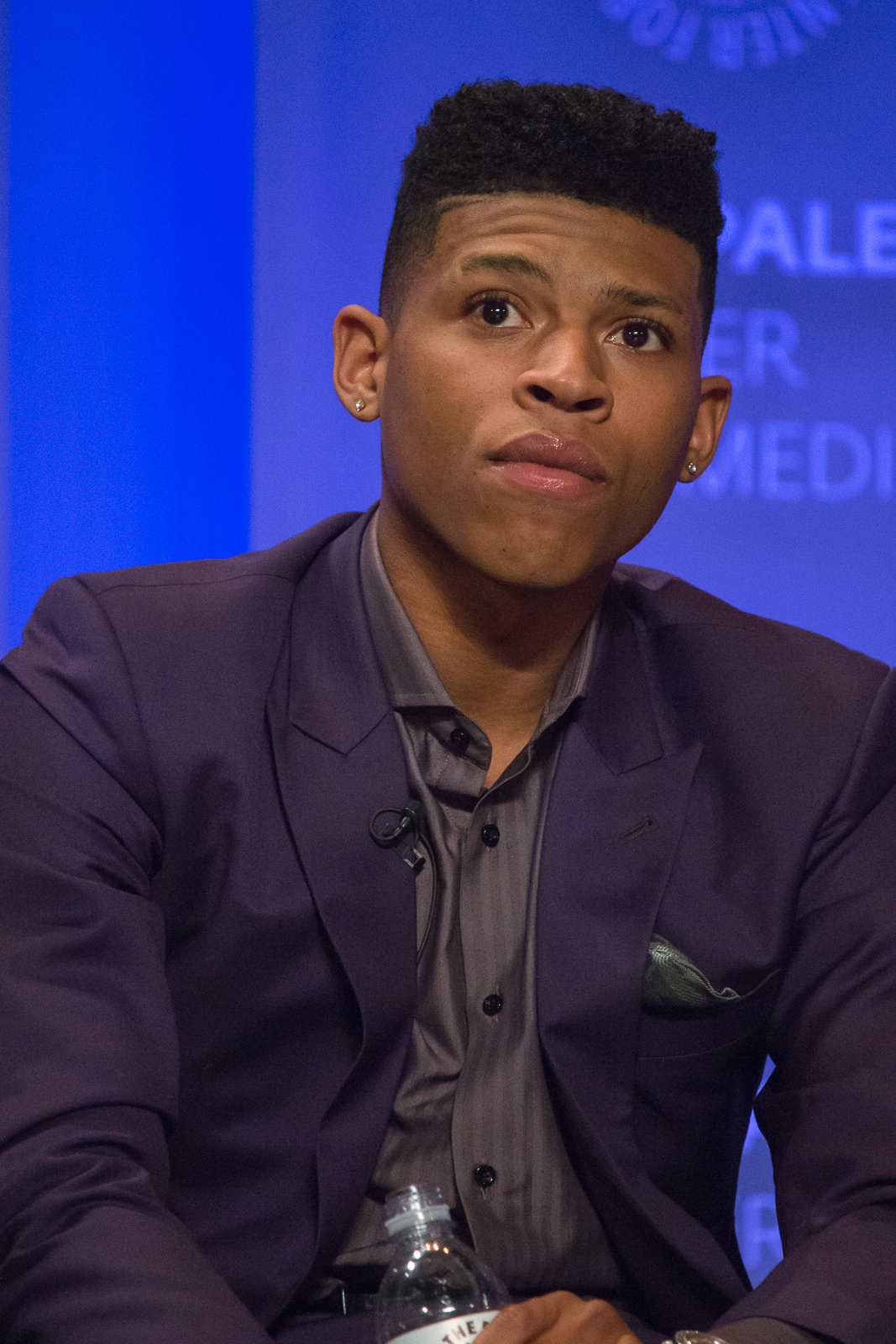
- Gray at 2016 PaleyFest
- Born: Bryshere Yazuan Gray; November 28, 1993 (age 32); Philadelphia, Pennsylvania, U.S.
- Other names: Yazz; Yazz the Greatest
- Occupations: actor; rapper
- Known for: Empire as Hakeem Lyon; The New Edition Story as Michael Bivins

Bryshere Yazuan Gray (born November 28, 1993), professionally known by the stage name Yazz the Greatest is an American actor and rapper, best known for his role as Hakeem Lyon in the Fox primetime musical drama television series Empire. He is also known for his portrayal as Michael Bivins in the 2017 BET miniseries The New Edition Story.

== Career ==
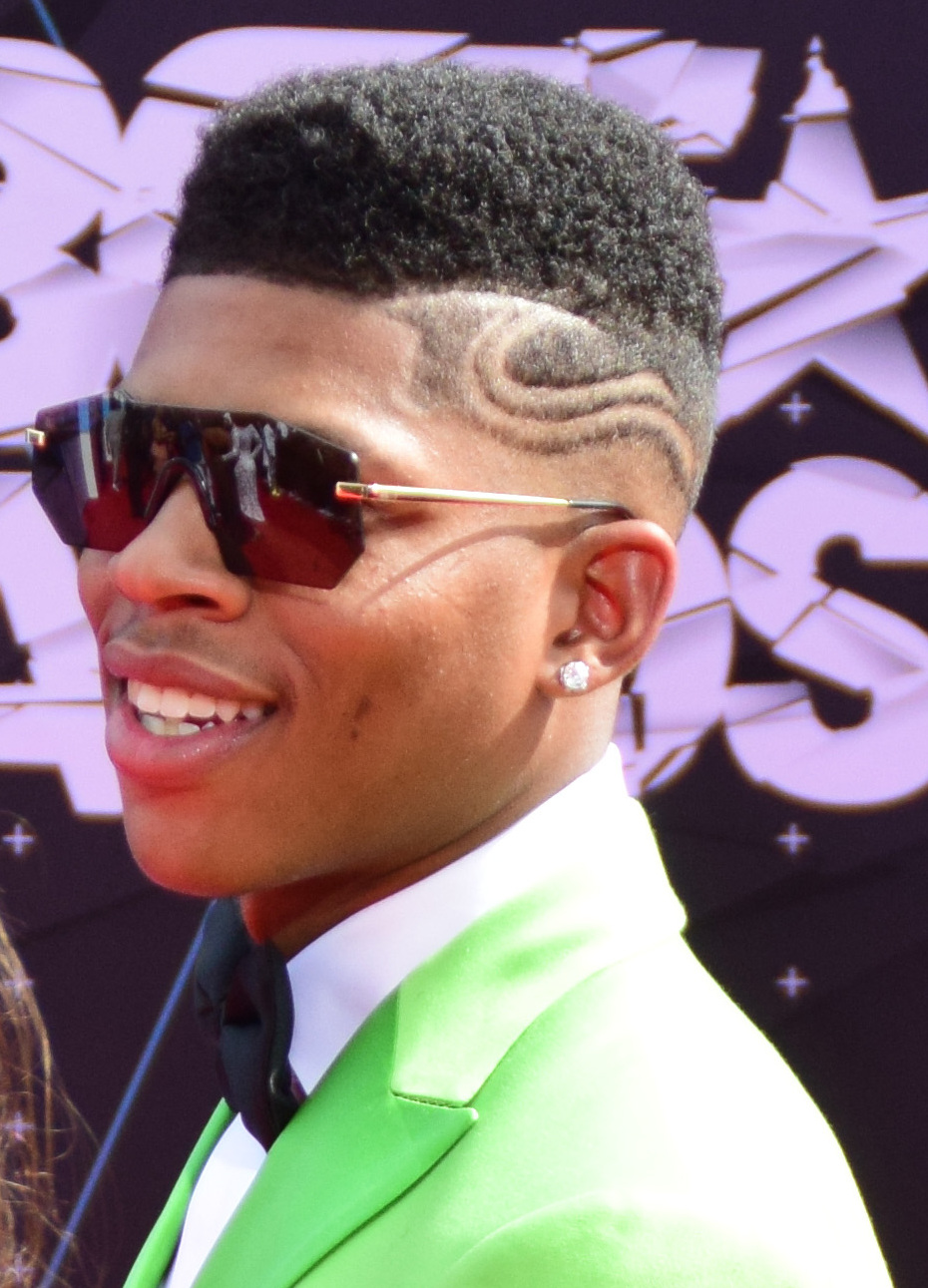
Gray at the 15th Annual BET Awards (2015).

Since 2013, Gray has performed at a variety of music festivals in the Philadelphia area, including Jay Z's Made in America Festival, The Roots' Picnic Festival, and Power 99FM's Powerhouse concert. He also has been the opening act for rappers, such as Fabolous and 2 Chainz. His debut single "Respect" was released in 2013. In 2015, Gray began his first acting role as Hakeem Lyon on the Fox drama TV series Empire, with co-stars Taraji P. Henson, Terrence Howard and Jussie Smollett. In March 2015, it was confirmed that both Smollett and Gray had been signed to Columbia Records as solo artists. In April 2016, Gray was cast, alongside Elijah Kelley, Luke James, Algee Smith, Keith Powers and Woody McClain, in a BET miniseries about R&B boyband New Edition, which debuted in January 2017. Gray was cast to portray New Edition co-founding member, Michael Bivins. In April 2018, Gray co-starred, as Tyrell, with Teyana Taylor in Honey: Rise Up and Dance.

== Filmography ==
Year	Title	Role	Notes
2015–2020	Empire	Hakeem Lyon	Main cast
2016	Celebrity Name Game	Himself	
2017	The New Edition Story	Michael Bivins	Miniseries; main cast
2017	Lip Sync Battle	Himself	Episode: "Bryshere Gray vs. Rumer Willis"
2018	Honey: Rise Up and Dance	Tyrell	Direct to video
2018	Sprinter	Marcus Brick	
2019	Canal Street	Kholi Styles	

== Discography ==
=== Singles ===
Title	Year	Peak chart positions			Albums
Title	Year	US	US R&B/HH	US R&B	Albums
"Respect"	2013	—	—	—	Non-album single
"No Apologies" (featuring Jussie Smollett)	2015	123	44	—	Empire: Original Soundtrack from Season 1
"Drip Drop" (featuring Serayah)	2015	114	37	—	Empire: Original Soundtrack from Season 1
"You're So Beautiful" (Jussie Smollett featuring Yazz)	2015	47	19	10	Empire: Original Soundtrack from Season 1
"Chasing the Sky" (Terrence Howard featuring Jussie Smollett and Yazz)	2016	—	—	24	Empire: Original Soundtrack Season 2 Volume 2
"Good People" (Jussie Smollett featuring Yazz)	2016	—	—	20	Empire: Original Soundtrack Season 2 Volume 2

== Awards and nominations ==
=== BET Awards ===
- 2018: Best Actor: Empire (Nominated)

=== NAACP Image Awards ===
- 2016 NAACP Image Awards: Outstanding Supporting Actor in a Drama Series: Empire (Nominated)
- 2016: Outstanding New Artist (Nominated)

=== Teen Choice Awards ===
- 2015: Choice TV: Breakout Star: Empire (Nominated)
- 2015: Choice TV: Chemistry: Empire (Nominated)
- 2015: Choice Music: Song From a Movie or TV Show: "You're So Beautiful" with Jussie Smollett (Nominated)
