= Empire season 5 =

Empire
- Season 5
- Promotional poster
- Starring: Terrence Howard; Taraji P. Henson; Bryshere Y. Gray; Jussie Smollett; Trai Byers; Gabourey Sidibe; Ta'Rhonda Jones; Serayah McNeill; Andre Royo; Chet Hanks; Rhyon Nicole Brown; Nicole Ari Parker; A.Z. Kelsey
- No. of episodes: 18

Release
- Original network: Fox
- Original release: September 26, 2018 – May 8, 2019

Season chronology
- ← Previous; Season 4 Next → Season 6

The fifth season of the American television drama series Empire premiered on September 26, 2018 and ended on May 8, 2019, in the United States on Fox. The season was ordered on May 2, 2018, consisting of eighteen episodes with Brett Mahoney taking over as showrunner from Ilene Chaiken. The show is produced by 20th Century Fox Television, in association with Imagine Entertainment, Lee Daniels Entertainment, Danny Strong Productions and Little Chicken Inc. The showrunners for this season are Mahoney, Danny Strong and Lee Daniels.

== Cast and characters ==
=== Main cast ===
- Terrence Howard as Lucious Lyon
- Taraji P. Henson as Cookie Lyon
- Bryshere Y. Gray as Hakeem Lyon
- Jussie Smollett as Jamal Lyon
- Trai Byers as Andre Lyon
- Gabourey Sidibe as Becky Williams
- Ta'Rhonda Jones as Porsha Taylor
- Serayah as Tiana Brown
- Nicole Ari Parker as Giselle Sims
- Andre Royo as Thirsty Rawlings
- Chet Hanks as Blake
- Rhyon Nicole Brown as Maya
- A.Z. Kelsey as Jeff Kingsley

=== Recurring cast ===
- Forest Whitaker as Eddie Barker
- Toby Onwumere as Kai Givens
- Katlynn Simone as Treasure
- Mario as Devon
- Skylan Brooks as Quincy
- Tasha Smith as Carol Holloway
- Phylicia Rashad as Diana DuBois
- Meta Golding as Teri
- Wood Harris as Damon Cross
- Vivica A. Fox as Candace Holloway
- Joss Stone as Wynter
- Tisha Campbell-Martin as Brooke
- Alicia Coppola as Megan Conway
- Xzibit as Shine
- Amanda Detmer as Tracy Kingsley

== Episodes ==
No. overall	No. in season	Title	Directed by	Written by	Original release date	Prod. code	U.S. viewers (millions)
67	1	"Steal from the Thief"	Sanaa Hamri	Brett Mahoney & Dianne Houston	September 26, 2018	5AXP01	6.09
Picking up two years after losing Empire to Eddie, Cookie and Lucious are still in the midst of picking up the pieces to regain control of their company. After a series of events, Jamal, who moved to London and enjoying his life, introduces his new boyfriend Kai to the family. Andre, who was placed in a prison correctional facility after Anika's murder and was sentenced to two years, is now preparing for his homecoming, and Hakeem, who is still reeling from the aftermath of the shooting incident, ends up getting shot, and is now focused on raising his own family with Tiana and struggling to get his career back on track. Also, in an effort to reclaim the Lyons' position in the music industry, Cookie sets her eyes on a talented new singer and rapper, Treasure. In a flashforward scene six months later, Lucious is seen mournfully caressing a casket containing the remains of an unknown individual.
68	2	"Pay for Their Presumptions"	John Krokidas	Yolonda E. Lawrence & Carlito Rodriguez	October 3, 2018	5AXP02	5.09
Cookie and Lucious learn the difficulties of launching an artist without Empire Entertainment's resources and when they receive two offers that will launch them back into power, one of them will be able to gain entrance back into Empire, so they make a surprising decision. Jamal decides to move back to New York and put his family first. Hakeem is struggling with his career at a standstill. An incident in the prison may threaten Andre's release. In a flashforward scene six months later, the FBI comes to talk to Lucious about what he knows about the murder.
69	3	"Pride"	Clement Virgo	Diane Ademu-John & Joshua Allen	October 10, 2018	5AXP03	5.15
When the family finds out that Andre is unable to make it home, Cookie and Lucious push to get back in the music game, but they will need the whole family and some old allies to make serious sacrifices in order to do so. They are attempting to build up under a new company from scratch in the comfort of their own home. Meanwhile, Andre finds a risky way to make a name for himself among his fellow inmates, Hakeem finds a new proposition in his music with help from Jamal, and Jeff Kingsley makes an unexpected visit to Diana DuBois.
70	4	"Love All, Trust a Few"	Mario Van Peebles	Matt Pyken & Cameron Johnson	October 17, 2018	5AXP04	5.21
Upon Andre's return, the Lyon family works to get back in their groove with a brand-new project underway. As Cookie and Portia attempt to sign Devon (Mario), who has just the sound they are looking for, Andre tries to prove himself useful to Lucious on the business side of things. Not having heard from Kai, Jamal panics and looks back at their history together. At Empire, the new management entangles itself with a dangerous tie from the Lyon family's past and Giselle forms a dangerous alliance with Diana DuBois.
71	5	"The Depth of Grief"	Elizabeth Allen Rosenbaum	Janeika James & Jasheika James & Jamie Rosengard	October 31, 2018	5AXP05	4.23
Lucious and Cookie prep their new artist Devon for a premiere listening party, but worry he may not be ready for that kind of pressure. Hakeem is determined to convince Tiana that he has matured, but she has a hard time letting go of everything they've struggled through the past couple years, including losing their daughter Princess, the twin sister of Prince. A news report has shown status that they have found Kai and that he is at the hospital. When Cookie learns about Kai's condition of being HIV positive, she becomes worried and concerned about Jamal. Elsewhere, Jamal and Kai exchange engagement proposals. Meanwhile, Andre continues his quest to get freedom for his fellow, innocent, inmate, Quincy.
72	6	"What Is Done"	Jussie Smollett	Felicia D. Henderson & Thomas Westfall	November 7, 2018	5AXP06	5.01
In an effort to sign more artists, Cookie and Lucious make a bet to see who can find someone first; Lucious bets on the chance to meet an up-and-coming rapper in a high-stakes poker game, while Cookie takes to the streets to find untapped talent in a set of auditions. Meanwhile, Hakeem refuses to leave the studio when his rage inspires what he considers his best music yet. Andre attempts to rebuild his fractured relationship with Hakeem. Jamal finds himself at a crossroads when Becky claims he's spending too much time with Kai during their movie date night and secrets are revealed.
73	7	"Treasons, Stratagems, and Spoils"	Tamra Davis	Joshua Allen & Dianne Houston	November 14, 2018	5AXP07	4.89
With Lyon Family Management and Empire working together, Lucious attempts to set aside differences with Jeff Kingsley so that their companies can get TBD back on the map. Meanwhile, Jamal grows frustrated with Cookie when she tries to steal his London artist, Wynter, out from under him and reveals to Cookie about his engagement. Andre works with Quincy's mother in order to get free her innocent son and Cookie realizes Candace is in danger when she sees bruises on her wrist. She and Carol suspect that it is her husband, Kevin, but it is really her son, Franklin who is abusive and suffering from mental health issues. This causes Candace to get upset with Cookie after Cookie calls the police on Franklin.
74	8	"Master of What Is Mine Own"	Dianne Houston	Matt Pyken & Yolonda E. Lawrence	November 28, 2018	5AXP08	5.03
The Lyons' finances are put under strain as Cookie plans a showcase for LFM's new talent. Jeff Kingsley's recent streak of reckless and impulsive decisions impede the Lyons further, prompting Andre, Becky, and Gisele to perform some espionage of their own. Secrets are revealed all over: Gisele discovers a hidden reason for Kingsley's animosity toward Lucious, a spiteful Candace exposes Cookie's hidden assets to Lucious, Jamal and Kai fight over their engagement becoming public, and Andre discovers that Kingsley is selling Empire customer data to the federal government. After breaking up with her boyfriend, Maya turns to Cookie for a place to stay and Cookie hires Maya to be her assistant. Tiana implores Hakeem to end his feud with Blake but the attempted reconciliation backfires, and in the midst of a family squabble everyone's attention is diverted when little Bella finds Hakeem's gun.
75	9	"Had It from My Father"	Sanaa Hamri	Diane Ademu-John & Carlito Rodriguez	December 5, 2018	5AXP09	5.04
In the midst of Bella finding Hakeem's gun, Hakeem was able to bring Bella back to peace. The financial security of the Lyon family is on the line as their LFM showcase quickly approaches. Kai's research for an exposé on Empire uncovers some dirty activity within the company and causes conflict with Jamal. Meanwhile, Hakeem and Tiana finally reach an agreement on how best to move forward with their relationship and Hakeem is finally able to squash his beef with Blake, Andre grows closer to Quincy's mother, Teri just as Quincy is finally released from prison. Andre also struggles with his decision to let Teri in and Kingsley strikes a deal with Giselle that put Lucious' reputation on the line. Lucious also finds out about Kingsley being his son and pays a visit to his ex-lover and Kingsley's mother, Tracy in the hospital. The final moment is Kingsley revealing his biological connection to Lucious to the entire Lyon family at the LFM showcase. In a flashforward scene three months later, Andre is seen flatlining in an operating room.
76	10	"My Fault Is Past"	Michael Goi	Craig Brewer & Cameron Johnson	March 13, 2019	5AXP10	4.40
After the secret is aired out about Kingsley being Lucious' son, Cookie pushes Lucious on plans to take him down. The Lyons are gained back into Empire and are set to prove Lucious and Becky's innocence. While Cookie struggles to content with Lucious' past and with Kingsley's place in it, Candace pays her a visit and the two make up. Also, Cookie pays Tracy a visit to the hospital wanting answers. Also, Jamal and Kai's relationship hits a major snag. Hakeem hooks Maya up with a fellow ballet dancer. Lucious ends up having a heart-to-heart conversation with Kingsley. Andre develops a severe nosebleed while driving with Teri and passes out.
77	11	"In Loving Virtue"	Clement Virgo	Felicia D. Henderson	March 20, 2019	5AXP11	3.98
With the reputation of the family business on the line, the Lyons strategize on how to clean up Kingsley's mess and introduce a new and improved Empire. As Lucious and Cookie hire Damon Cross, an old acquaintance to help track down the money Eddie stole. Cookie takes up of Damon's offer and they reminisce the time that Cookie helped Damon in the elevator and Cookie is torn between two lovers. Andre tries to convince Devon's record label to let him record with Empire. Meanwhile, Jamal attempts to move on after his breakup with Kai so he tries to find a female vocalist track on his new song, so he has to choose between Tiana and Treasure which causes major competition.
78	12	"Shift and Save Yourself"	Dianne Houston	Matt Pyken & Thomas Westfall	March 27, 2019	5AXP12	3.97
While ruthless FBI agent Megan Conway relentlessly interrogates Thirsty for information about his dealings with Lucious and Damon, the Lyons embark on a tour with free ticket sales in an attempt to regain the trust of their audiences: Kelly Patel refuses to fund the tour, but Giselle (to her surprise) sides with the Lyons. Jamal finds a way to defuse the tense feud between Tiana and Treasure by turning his song into a duet starring both of them. Andre discovers he has stage four lymphoma and tries to leave assets for Teri and Quincy: Teri vows to help him through his cancer.
79	13	"Hot Blood, Hot Thoughts, Hot Deeds"	Gabourey Sidibe	Diane Ademu-John & Evan Price	April 3, 2019	5AXP13	4.12
Thirsty's revelation of Conway's investigation prompts Cookie and Giselle to cover their tracks while leaving Damon Cross as the scapegoat. Teri takes Andre for his first round of chemotherapy. The Trust Tour gets off to a shaky start when Maya convinces Blake to go after Tiana again and Wynter attempts to push Jamal into getting over Kai: accidents and sabotage disrupt the dress rehearsal, leading to social media backlash. A traumatized Treasure refuses to return to the stage until Lucious personally encourages her to return; a grief-stricken Jamal struggles to perform the song he wrote for Kai until another sabotage incident prompts Wynter to duet besides Jamal. The tour afterparty deteriorates into drunken makeout sessions among the various artists: Blake, heartbroken over seeing Tiana with Carlito, slips away into Maya's embrace, Kai shows up out of the blue to be with Jamal again, and a drunken Treasure forces herself on Lucious even as he fights her off, prompting Cookie to storm furiously into Damon's room. Andre suffers a severe reaction to the chemotherapy, prompting Teri to finally inform Lucious: while Lucious is processing his grief, Treasure's crooked ex-manager arrives to demand money; an infuriated Lucious beats him to death.
80	14	"Without All Remedy"	Craig Brewer	Jamie Rosengard	April 10, 2019	5AXP14	3.76
Plans for the Trust Tour are put on hold as the family learns of Andre's cancer so they do their best to support him and to balance out stress. Tension molds between Lucious and Cookie as Cookie is still reeling from her run-in with Lucious and Treasure. Because of Lucious' "betrayal" she takes her frustrations out on Teri. Treasure comes clean to Cookie, who is grief-stricken over the previous night with Damon (although she panicked and fled his room before anything occurred). Jamal and Kai painfully reaffirm their love before Jamal and Hakeem perform "Lean on Me" in tribute to Andre, and Conway tracks down Kingsley to take down Lucious.
81	15	"A Wise Father That Knows His Own Child"	Dawn Wilkinson	Yolonda E. Lawrence & Carlito Rodriguez	April 17, 2019	5AXP15	3.76
During a church event for Andre organized by Teri, six weeks have passed and Andre's health deteriorates. Lucious attempts to make amends with Kingsley, who is still working in with Agent Conway and the Feds about the Panama funding for the Trust Tour and taking down Lucious. Cookie, not getting the compassion she needs from her husband, finds some in Damon. Becky asks Hakeem for a favor in to doing a collaboration with Devon. Jamal and Kai push up their wedding date. Lucious pays Tracy a visit to the hospital, tending to build a relationship with his son. Meanwhile, Kingsley comes to Lucious and demands to find out the truth about what happened between him and Tracy. During a tearful conversation, Kingsley shows Lucious the watch with the recording device by the Feds and Lucious pleads to Kingsley to let him be his father. Kingsley is invited to dinner with the Lyons, who are not giving him such a warm welcome, but try to keep the peace now that they learn that Andre is getting better. When Kingsley backs out in taking down Lucious, Conway takes matters into her own hands by raiding the Trust Tour.
82	16	"Never Doubt I Love"	Darren Grant	Joshua Allen & Thomas Westfall	April 24, 2019	5AXP16	3.77
As Jamal and Kai's wedding day nears, Lucious is feeling uneasy when Jamal suggests that he and Cookie walk Jamal down the aisle. At the dinner party at the Lyon house, Lucious and Cookie meet Kai's parents for the first time. Also, Damon shows up unexpectedly to return the Derrick Adams painting that Lucious lost in the poker game and Lucious (unaware that Thirsty had already sold the painting to Damon) begins to wonder how the painting ended up in Damon's possession. At Laviticus, Becky decides to throw Jamal a bachelor party and Andre invites Kingsley to make amends. With Jamal and Hakeem feeling salty about Kingsley's arrival, they wonder if Kingsley still has motives on taking the family down, but Kingsley wants to make peace. On Jamal and Kai's wedding day, Lucious gets picked up by the Feds and Conway begins her interrogation into Lucious. Hakeem, who doesn't want to go to the wedding alone after his and Tiana's separation and hears that Tiana is already going with Devon, asks Maya to be his last minute plus one. Damon shows up to the wedding, after Jamal invited him making Cookie feel uncomfortable, ultimately exposing their secret as Jamal sees from a distance. Lucious arrives just in time after showing up a half hour late and is ready to put their differences aside and is able to walk his son down the aisle. Jamal and Kai say their vows and finally get married. At the reception, Kai was ready to let the world know about him being HIV-Positive and isn't afraid of it being used against him. Cookie and Kingsley finally make amends and Teri confides in Cookie that she's pregnant but decides to keep it a secret from Andre. In the last moment, Lucious begins to wonder about Andre's strange behavior (which is giving Lucious' cufflinks to Jamal as a wedding present and Kingsley stepping up to being the mantle of the family), Andre tells Lucious that he is still dying and that the chemo used to kill the lymphoma destroyed his heart muscle and Andre wants to commit suicide instead.
83	17	"My Fate Cries Out"	Paul McCrane	Janeika James & Jasheika James & Cameron Johnson	May 1, 2019	5AXP17	3.73
Lucious struggles to cope with the fate of Andre's health and after a severe car accident, Lucious is visited by numerous demons of whom he has killed in the past: Bunkie, Shyne, and his father, Joseph (whom he witnessed getting murdered at the age of 9.) Andre wants to make his last days in the world memorable so he lays down three copies of notes to Cookie, Jamal and Hakeem and also goes to a Rollerblade rink with Cookie and they have a heart-to-heart conversation. Meanwhile, Cookie gets picked up by Conway and the Feds froze Empire's bank accounts due to an artist's check being bounced so Andre, Becky and Giselle work together to put on a concert with the help of Kingsley's investment. Both Hakeem and Tiana perform with Sevyn Streeter and Ty Dolla Sign. Teri tells Cookie that she and Andre are having a baby boy but still wants to keep it a secret from Andre. In the final moment, Andre has dinner with his father while Cookie reads the note he left for her about his heart, and she anxiously rushes out to him at his hotel room and Cookie tells him about Teri's pregnancy and Andre is seen passing out on the floor in front of his parents.
84	18	"The Roughest Day"	Craig Brewer	Brett Mahoney & Felicia D. Henderson	May 8, 2019	5AXP18	4.09
Andre's life hangs in the balance as he is rushed to the hospital and the doctors are trying to revive him until he finally has a pulse. Cookie blames Lucious for Andre wanting to kill himself. Kingsley shows up at the hospital comforting his father and the two spend the day together. Cookie vows to stand by Andre as he is still waiting on getting a new heart. Andre finds out about Teri's pregnancy and buys her a ring and proposes to her and the two have a private wedding at the hospital along with their family. After a heated argument with Tracy, Kingsley goes to Empire, holding Lucious at gunpoint to prove about being a Lyon. During an emotional confrontation, Kingsley commits suicide as Lucious tries to talk him out of it. He then finds out that Kingsley's heart can save Andre via surgery. After hearing about her son's death, a furious and grieving Tracy lashes out at Lucious before having a heart-to-heart conversation with Cookie, opening up to her about letting the doctors put goes through with the transplant. At Empire, Becky is offered a new job at Def Jam records but with everything going on with the Trust Tour she might be forced to take it, so Giselle comes up with an alternate plan by relaunching Empire XStream and releasing a video compilation of the tour. Also, Becky tired of not getting credit for her and Giselle's work, manage to start their own record label together that is cosigned with Empire. Kingsley is revealed to be the one in the coffin and the feds pay a grieving Lucious a visit and also show him pictures of Cookie's relationship with Damon. Lucious thinks that Damon is secretly working with the feds, and they are closing in. Lucious plans on escaping town and asks Thirsty to look over his boys and the company. Lucious wants to escape with Cookie, but she realizes that she needs a break from Lucious and Empire and tells him that she had slept with Damon, thus ending their relationship.

== Production ==
=== Development ===
As part of the renewal process, Brett Mahoney took over as showrunner from Ilene Chaiken.

=== Casting ===
On July 18, 2018, Deadline Hollywood reported that Rhyon Nicole Brown has been upped to regular cast. On June 25, 2018, Nicole Ari Parker was also upgraded to series regular status after recurring in the fourth season.

On February 22, 2019, series executives announced that Jussie Smollett would not appear in the final two episodes of the season. Smollett had been arrested in Chicago one day earlier, on charges of disorderly conduct and filing a false police report in connection with an assault on him that authorities believed he had staged.

== Reception ==
=== Ratings ===
Viewership and ratings per episode of Empire season 5
No.	Title	Air date	Rating/share (18–49)	Viewers (millions)	DVR (18–49)	DVR viewers (millions)	Total (18–49)	Total viewers (millions)
1	"Steal From the Thief"	September 26, 2018	1.9/9	6.09	0.8	2.16	2.8	8.26
2	"Pay For Their Presumptions"	October 3, 2018	1.5/7	5.09	0.9	2.27	2.4	7.36
3	"Pride"	October 10, 2018	1.6/7	5.15	0.8	2.09	2.4	7.22
4	"Love All, Trust a Few"	October 17, 2018	1.6/7	5.21	0.8	2.03	2.4	7.25
5	"The Depth of Grief"	October 31, 2018	1.2/5	4.23	0.7	2.03	1.9	6.26
6	"What is Done"	November 7, 2018	1.5/6	5.01	0.7	2.07	2.2	7.08
7	"Treasons, Stratagems, and Spoils"	November 14, 2018	1.4/6	4.89	0.8	2.05	2.2	6.94
8	"Master of What Is Mine Own"	November 28, 2018	1.6/7	5.03	0.6	1.83	2.2	6.87
9	"Had It From My Father"	December 5, 2018	1.5/7	5.04	0.7	1.94	2.2	6.99
10	"My Fault Is Past"	March 13, 2019	1.2/6	4.40	0.7	1.67	1.9	6.07
11	"In Loving Virtue"	March 20, 2019	1.2/6	3.98	0.6	1.69	1.8	5.68
12	"Shift and Save Yourself"	March 27, 2019	1.1/5	3.97	0.7	1.72	1.8	5.69
13	"Hot Blood, Hot Thoughts, Hot Deeds"	April 3, 2019	1.2/6	4.12	0.6	1.58	1.8	5.70
14	"Without All Remedy"	April 10, 2019	1.1/5	3.76	0.5	1.53	1.6	5.29
15	"A Wise Father That Knows His Own Child"	April 17, 2019	1.1/5	3.76	0.6	1.67	1.7	5.43
16	"Never Doubt I Love"	April 24, 2019	1.1/5	3.77	0.6	1.64	1.7	5.41
17	"My Fate Cries Out"	May 1, 2019	1.1/5	3.73	0.6	1.62	1.7	5.36
18	"The Roughest Day"	May 8, 2019	1.2/6	4.09	0.6	1.56	1.8	5.66
