= Empire season 6 =

Empire
- Season 6
- Promotional poster
- Starring: Terrence Howard; Taraji P. Henson; Bryshere Y. Gray; Trai Byers; Gabourey Sidibe; Ta'Rhonda Jones; Serayah; Vivica A. Fox; Nicole Ari Parker; Meta Golding; A.Z. Kelsey; Rhyon Nicole Brown; Mario; Katlynn Simone; Wood Harris
- No. of episodes: 18

Release
- Original network: Fox
- Original release: September 24, 2019 – April 21, 2020

Season chronology
- ← Previous; Season 5

The sixth and final season of the American television drama series Empire premiered on September 24, 2019, in the United States on Fox. The season was ordered on April 30, 2019. The show is produced by 20th Century Fox Television, in association with Imagine Entertainment, Lee Daniels Entertainment, Danny Strong Productions and Little Chicken Inc. The showrunners for this season are Mahoney, Danny Strong and Lee Daniels.

== Cast and characters ==
=== Main cast ===
- Terrence Howard as Lucious Lyon
- Taraji P. Henson as Cookie Lyon
- Bryshere Y. Gray as Hakeem Lyon
- Trai Byers as Andre Lyon
- Gabourey Sidibe as Becky Williams
- Ta'Rhonda Jones as Porsha Taylor
- Serayah as Tiana Brown
- Vivica A. Fox as Candace Holloway Mason
- Nicole Ari Parker as Giselle Sims
- Meta Golding as Teri Lyon
- A.Z. Kelsey as Jeff Kingsley
- Rhyon Nicole Brown as Maya
- Mario as Devon
- Katlynn Simone as Treasure
- Wood Harris as Damon Cross

=== Guest cast ===
- Alexandra Grey as Melody Barnes
- Kiandra Richardson as Yana Cross
- Amanda Detmer as Tracy Kingsley
- Tasha Smith as Carol Holloway
- Skylan Brooks as Quincy
- David Banner as Philly Street
- Veronika Bozeman as Veronica
- Keesha Sharp as Dr. Paula Wick
- Robert Ri'chard as Julian Sims
- Leslie Uggams as Leah Walker
- Mario Van Peebles as Uncle Ray
- Kash Doll as Herself

== Episodes ==
No. overall	No. in season	Title	Directed by	Written by	Original release date	Prod. code	U.S. viewers (millions)
85	1	"What Is Love"	Sanaa Hamri	Dianne Houston & Brett Mahoney	September 24, 2019	6AXP01	3.31
Lucious, now a wanted fugitive, is on the run from the feds. Cookie keeps busy by focusing on her new brand outside of Empire, which now includes a daytime talk show and a community center. Andre is now married to Teri and preparing for their child's birth. He's currently sitting on the Empire throne and is confronted by several people, who now want to get in on the company, like Tracy, who with help from Cookie is now co-owner of the company and Mouse, a former cellmate friend of Andre's, who was just released from prison and is looking for Andre's help to break him into the business world since Andre owed him from a previous incident arrangement. Hakeem sets his sights on the lead role as his father in the first Empire movie. Meanwhile, Becky and Giselle search for their first Bossy Media artist, but complications arise. Teri begins to experience complications with the baby. In a flashforward scene to nine months later, Lucious is shot multiple times in his living room and crashes onto his coffee table.
86	2	"Got on My Knees to Pray"	Mario Van Peebles	Matt Pyken & Indira Gibson Wilson	October 1, 2019	6AXP02	2.94
While Lucious continues his run from the Feds, Cookie confronts Damon about why he lied to her. Andre is forced to deal with an unforeseen family complication while making a difficult decision between his wife or his baby. Becky and Giselle try to get the star power they need from their first Bossy Media artist Lala. Tiana helps Devon find his sound. Andre prays to God and for hope on saving Teri and the baby only to find out that Kingsley, who appears as a ghost saved Andre's family. Damon shows up at Cookie's place threatening her after finding out that Lucious had taken his laptop with all the evidence to prove Lucious' innocence. Andre welcomes his new son Walker into the family.
87	3	"You Broke Love"	Howard Deutch	Yolonda E. Lawrence & Marcus J. Guillory	October 8, 2019	6AXP03	2.79
While Lucious' plan to escape from the Feds finally comes to a head, Cookie is being held hostage by Damon which places her in a dangerous situation. Andre continues to be haunted by Kingsley that he can't seem to shake, while Tiana receives backlash from fans over a social media post and her and Treasure bond over their personal struggles. Meanwhile, Becky tries her new artist on track and is surprised by an unexpected visit from her family.
88	4	"Tell the Truth"	Bille Woodruff	Jamie Rosengard & Michael Martin	October 15, 2019	6AXP04	2.74
A happy family occasion brings the Lyon family back together, but it becomes apparent that no one seems to see eye-to-eye, especially the fractured relationship between Lucious and Cookie. Lucious, unhappy with how Empire and the Empire movie are progressing, springs into action and comes face-to-face with demons from his past. Meanwhile, Cookie reaches her breaking point and considers seeking help through therapy and Andre encourages Tiana to smooth over the controversy she created for the company but Tiana's antics have ever-lasting consequences. Giselle and Becky attempt to sign Tiana to Bossy Media in order to do a collaboration with Lala, although Tiana is now all too willing to defect. In a flashforward scene to nine months later, Cookie hurriedly gets into her car, and it suddenly explodes.
89	5	"Stronger Than My Rival"	Dawn Wilkinson	Janeika James & Jasheika James	November 5, 2019	6AXP05	2.48
As his relationship with Cookie worsens, Lucious, still obsessed with his past, tries to make amends for his wrongdoings with Philly Street, an old friend from years ago. Cookie vies to take control of the house, putting the whole family in the middle. Andre and Lucious go head-to-head in a competition to figure out the direction Empire should be heading in. Meanwhile, Becky and Giselle are at odds over the future of Bossy Records. Cookie holds a fundraiser at her community center, where she publicly reveals that she went to jail for Lucious. Lucious shares a startling secret of his own with Cookie about the $400,000 that invested Empire in the first place: when Lucious robbed Philly Street of the $400,000. Cookie then learns the ugly truth of her 17-year incarceration and turns in the house key, thus leaving Lucious.
90	6	"Heart of Stone"	Sanaa Hamri	Teleplay by : Stacy A. Littlejohn; Story by : Stacy A. Littlejohn & Thomas Westfall	November 12, 2019	6AXP06	2.60
After her fight with Lucious, Cookie has moved into a hotel and Lucious shows up at her door unannounced begging her to come home, but Cookie refuses after what Lucious had said about the $400,000 and her 17-year sentence. Candace and Carol then take Cookie on a girls' trip to Miami to have some fun and take her mind off Lucious, but after one wild night ultimately puts them behind bars. After an unsettling visit with his mother Leah, Lucious is left to deal with some inward self-reflection by digging deep into his past. Meanwhile, Andre makes a bold decision regarding Treasure's upcoming album but his moves are blocked by Lucious. Giselle goes behind Becky's back to find Tiana a new audience by having her perform at a local church event. Yana shows up at Lucious' door confronting him about why he betrayed her.
91	7	"Good Enough"	Gabourey Sidibe	Cameron Johnson & Evan Price	November 19, 2019	6AXP07	2.65
After realizing that music is her real first love, Cookie makes moves to get back into the music world by getting her Tea Talk producers to launch a segment on the show and offers to throw an event to gain exposure for Bossy Media. Meanwhile, Lucious tries to regain control of Empire by attempting to sabotage Andre's vision for the company. Also, Hakeem feels threatened by Devon's strong bond with Prince and Bella.
92	8	"Do You Remember Me"	Ruben Garcia	Leah Benavides Rodriguez & Carlito Rodriguez	November 26, 2019	6AXP08	2.45
Upon taking her first steps back into music, Cookie finally gets her musical segment on Tea Talk and discovers that one of Lala's background singers and her vocal coach, Melody, is also an artist with raw talent when Lucious dismissed years ago (previously known to him as Melvin). Cookie wants to work with her in order to find her voice. Meanwhile, Lucious spends a day in the city with Yana and is surprised to discover they have much more in common than he originally thought. Also, Andre pulls out all the stops in order to convince a reluctant artist, Prophetic the Poet to sign with Empire. Tracy finds evidence that incriminates Lucious by discovering an old tape of Shyne rapping about how him and Lucious robbed Philly Street of the $400,000. Giselle runs into an old friend, who could help Bossy Media with its financial trouble, but later backs out of the deal when Becky gives her valid points. Philly Street listens to Shyne's rap tape and him and Tracy plot for revenge.
93	9	"Remember the Music"	Geary McLeod	Matt Pyken & Indira Gibson Wilson	December 3, 2019	6AXP09	2.55
As Lucious and Cookie clash about how the Empire movie should go, Hakeem raises concerns over Lucious' changes to the script, causing Lucious and Cookie to come together to recount the events, that led to the evolution of Empire. Andre turns to Kelly Patel to help him gain controlling interest in the company, as Teri grows increasingly suspicious of Andre's role in signing Prophet the Poet. Meanwhile, Bossy Media considers taking on a silent partner to help with their financial issues and when they realize they haven't found what they are looking for, Cookie steps in as the official partner at Bossy. Philly confronts Lucious about the information he received from White Tracy and learns the truth. Also, Cookie serves Lucious with divorce papers.
94	10	"Cold Cold Man"	Sanaa Hamri	Dianne Houston & Jamie Rosengard	December 17, 2019	6AXP10	2.52
While figuring out the next steps for the divorce, Cookie becomes frustrated with Lucious, who is struggling to accept that their relationship is over. Upon being shut out of the ASA nominations, the women of Bossy choose Melody to take their performance slot at the ASAs, causing Tiana to question all of her decisions over the past few months. Meanwhile, Teri confronts Andre over his lies. Philly confronts Lucious about the robbing and Lucious comes clean to him. Furious that Tracy snitched on him, Lucious kicks her out of Empire. Cookie finally meets Yana and tells her about the entangled war between Damon and Lucious and that she was being used as a pawn. Tiana questions her relationship with Devon, and Hakeem returns just in time for the ASAs. Tiana then confesses her feelings for Hakeem. Lucious finally confronts his feelings on why he couldn't sign the papers and confesses that he's still in love with Cookie and the two share an emotional moment right before Tracy walks in holding the both of them at gunpoint.
95	11	"Can't Truss 'Em"	Clement Virgo	Michael C. Martin & Cameron Johnson	March 3, 2020	6AXP11	2.43
In the midst of Tracy holding both Lucious and Cookie at gunpoint, Andre walks in on them forcing Cookie to pull the trigger after fearing for her son's aid, and Tracy dies. Cookie then has to deal with the aftermath of the shooting which triggers a traumatic discovery from her past: that she shot someone years ago. Lucious finally signs the divorce papers. Meanwhile, Andre makes an important decision about his health, family and career as Kingsley gets into his head once again and Devon confronts Tiana about her relationship with Hakeem. Also, a shocking revelation about the future of the Lyons is revealed.
96	12	"Talk Less"	Dawn Wilkinson	Stacy A. Littlejohn & Marcus J. Guillory	March 10, 2020	6AXP12	1.89
After a disastrous dinner party at Andre and Teri's, Teri realizes she has had enough of the Lyon family drama and Andre recommits himself to his family and his business. Cookie, still unable to cope with her traumatic history from her past, is hitting more and more deeper than she thought, as she realizes that her victim is Durrell, a guy that Carol used to date a long time ago and the father of her kids. Lucious hunts for a record deal for Yana, but is met with surprising feedback from the label executives, who want to sign her. Lucious then brokers peace with Damon to hear Yana out on her signing and Lucious convinces Cookie to give her the deal to sign over to Bossy. Feeling neglected by her team at Bossy Media, Lala pulls a dangerous stunt to take promotion into her own hands. Giselle deals with a family emergency regarding her brother, Julian, and Andre suffers from burnouts and lapses of judgement as Kingsley pushes for more control of the company as an act of revenge for the death of his mother.
97	13	"Come Undone"	Taraji P. Henson	Dianne Houston & Evan Price	March 17, 2020	6AXP13	2.64
Lucious convinces Cookie about coming clean to Carol about killing Durrell in order to move forward. When Andre pushes Treasure to perform in an upcoming showcase, she is unable to perform after she loses her voice, so Becky suggests that Yana take the spot, but Lucious feels she's not ready yet. When Lucious has a heated confrontation with Cookie about Yana, Cookie accidentally slips up about killing Durrell and Carol overhears the conversation, leaving her distraught. An old secret of Giselle's comes back to haunt her regarding Julian: that in fact she actually is his mother instead of his sister. As Giselle struggles to tell Julian the truth, Maya sets her sights on breaking into singing and getting her own recording deal, which places Porsha in a difficult situation. Andre's actions put Quincy in a very bad situation, when he gets into trouble for drugs. During a live performance at Tea Talk, Carol reverts to her old ways when she shows up at the event drunk. Still reeling from the situation about Durrell, Carol reveals a secret about Cookie that may tear their relationship apart.
98	14	"I Am Who I Am"	Ishai Setton	Colin Waite & Paul Eriksen	March 24, 2020	6AXP14	2.72
When one of Carol's kids pops up on Cookie at a studio session worried that their mom has fully gone back to her old ways, Cookie and Candace immediately take Carol back to rehab and during their road trip they uncover painful memories from their past. Kingsley's still trying to get more control of Andre which leads to major complications involving working Treasure too hard, getting into a brawl with Devon and Teri's fear increases worrying about her husband's life and she tries to postpone the wedding. Devon learns of Tiana's affair with Hakeem. Lucious uses something special from the past to help give Yana her big break. Meanwhile, Maya hatches a scheme to generate more buzz for the "Birth of an Empire" movie and Carol reveals to Cookie that she and Candace called the police on her and Lucious, when Cookie thought that it was a DEA investigation that led her taking the fall for Lucious and be imprisoned for 17 years.
99	15	"Love Me Still"	Dianne Houston	Matt Pyken & Thomas Westfall	March 31, 2020	6AXP15	2.58
With Andre's wedding approaching, he is determined that the event is set on perfect for the upcoming occasion. And Teri begins having doubts on whether she wants to walk down the aisle as her fears from Andre's temper rise to the surface. Bossy partners Cookie, Giselle and Becky, along with Porsha, who want to launch an event to make sure that Bossy Media rises on top of the map, so they come up with the idea of having Bossychella: a Coachella-themed event of where female artists compete to show off their talent. But their plans are thrown into derail, when Cookie and Becky learn that Giselle borrowed money from Damon. Lucious takes steps to support Yana in her career, but Yana starts to fall for him again. Andre tries to make amends with Treasure and Devon while Candace tries to make amends with Cookie. Maya sets her sights on Hakeem and after hearing on his wedding day that Teri decided not to go through with the wedding, Andre has a major meltdown, triggering a worried Cookie and Lucious.
100	16	"We Got Us"	Clement Virgo	Janeika James & Jasheika James	April 7, 2020	6AXP16	2.80
After witnessing Andre's breakdown, Lucious and Cookie have him committed to the same treatment facility as Leah and the guilt Cookie feels from Andre's situation causes her to wonder how different life would be if she had not gone to prison. After months have passed, she goes to have another therapy session with Dr. Wick to get to the root of the problem. Meanwhile, Becky struggles with balancing her personal and professional relationships. After one drunken night in Vegas, Hakeem and Maya wake up to find out that they are legally married so they scramble to get an annulment. Porsha and Becky's friendship becomes tested, when Becky hands over one of Porsha's tracks to rap artist Kash Doll without her consent. Andre receives a visit from Grandma Leah as she gives Andre her words of wisdom and consults Andre to get rid of Kingsley's ghost for good. After learning that Andre has escaped from the facility, Cookie and Lucious struggle to find their missing son. Andre later shows up at Teri's apartment, leaving an agitated Teri to immediately run into a faraway room with little Walker in her arms. Lucious shows up just in time to talk and calm Andre down and to make sure that Teri and the baby are okay. In the midst of all the drama, Cookie is reunited with Candace and Carol as they comfort her. Andre goes to a church to get a spiritual cleanse and he makes sure that he gets his life right by getting rid of Kingsley. Later that night, Lucious brings Andre home and is reunited with the family and apologizes for his behavior. Note: This episode marks the 100th episode.
101	17	"Over Everything"	Stephen D'Amato	Jamie Rosengard & Cameron Johnson	April 14, 2020	6AXP17	2.69
When Cookie finds out that she couldn't launch Bossyfest because of a previous incident with the ASAs, she steps in to do some damage control so she teams up with Lucious to take down the CEO. With Andre taking a break to get himself together, Lucious continues to run Empire and discovers some of Andre's business missteps by way of Kelly Patel. Kelly has other ideas in mind with the help of Giselle, who weaseled her way back into Empire. When Andre hears of this, he attempts to fix his errors. Meanwhile, Hakeem and Maya's unlikely partnership proves to be beneficial and Tiana grows jealous over their relationship. Becky celebrates her birthday by throwing a big lavish-themed party. Andre visits Teri at her apartment wanting to reconcile with his family, but Teri feels she can no longer trust him so Andre makes an elaborate plan to better himself and for his family: he plans to go on a church mission trip in South America and plans on not coming back.
102	18	"Home Is on the Way"	Geary McLeod; Bille Woodruff	Yolonda E. Lawrence & Michael C. Martin and Matt Pyken & Indira Gibson Wilson	April 21, 2020	6AXP18	2.94
In the series finale, Cookie does some reflection on who she has become, while Lucious is left to choose between Empire and his Family. While Andre moves forward with his plans to leave for South Africa, Cookie, Lucious, and Hakeem try to convince him to stay for Teri and Walker. Amidst their ongoing family conflicts, Cookie and Lucious team up to undermine Giselle and Kelly Patel by becoming board members of Pamplemousse, which ultimately brings them closer together. Meanwhile, Becky is putting the finishing touches on BossyFest, and her stress causes her to say hurtful things to Porsha, bringing even more tension between them. After taking some time to contemplate, Lucious decides not to go with Yana on tour, instead staying in New York to be with Cookie. He gives Cookie a collection of unsent prison letters and has Yana perform "Home Is On The Way", a song he wrote for Cookie. At BossyFest, Maya and Hakeem's relationship continues to develop, and Becky and Porsha make amends after Becky lets Porsha perform with Tiana. Damon Cross is also at BossyFest, where he learns that Yana and Lucious have been involved. He attempts to kill Lucious as he and Yana are embracing, but ends up killing Yana instead. This prompts a war between Lucious and Damon, and Lucious prepares for the worst by having Philly Street deliver a Goodbye card to Cookie before his fight with Damon. After Cookie receives the card, she rushes to the mansion in attempt to save Lucious, which ends up being successful. The finale ends with The Lyon Family attending the Empire movie premiere and Hakeem singing "The Oath" a song that summarizes the show.

== Production ==
After allegations that Smollett staged his own attack, on April 30, 2019, it was announced that although Fox Entertainment had extended his contract for season six, there were no plans for the character to appear during the season.

On June 4, 2019, series co-creator Lee Daniels officially announced that Smollett would not be returning for the sixth and final season.

On September 3, 2019, it was announced Katlynn Simone, Meta Golding, Wood Harris, Mario and Vivica A. Fox had been promoted to series regulars for the final season.

In April 2020, it was confirmed that the series would conclude with its 18th episode, instead of the 20th, which was originally set to be the series finale. Episode 18 was the final episode that had completed production before the COVID-19 pandemic caused Hollywood productions to be shut down. Footage from the uncompleted nineteenth episode was included in the final aired version of the eighteenth episode in an attempt to provide closure.

== Reception ==
=== Ratings ===
Viewership and ratings per episode of Empire season 6
No.	Title	Air date	Rating/share (18–49)	Viewers (millions)	DVR (18–49)	DVR viewers (millions)	Total (18–49)	Total viewers (millions)
1	"What is Love"	September 24, 2019	1.0/5	3.31	0.7	2.02	1.7	5.33
2	"Got on My Knees to Pray"	October 1, 2019	0.9/5	2.94	0.5	1.55	1.4	4.50
3	"You Broke Love"	October 8, 2019	0.8/4	2.79	0.7	1.67	1.5	4.47
4	"Tell the Truth"	October 15, 2019	0.8/4	2.74	0.6	1.71	1.4	4.45
5	"Stronger Than My Rival"	November 5, 2019	0.7/4	2.48	0.6	1.57	1.3	4.06
6	"Heart of Stone"	November 12, 2019	0.7/4	2.60	0.5	1.49	1.2	4.09
7	"Good Enough"	November 19, 2019	0.7/4	2.65	0.5	1.43	1.2	4.08
8	"Do You Remember Me"	November 26, 2019	0.6/3	2.45	0.5	1.45	1.1	3.90
9	"Remember the Music"	December 3, 2019	0.7/4	2.55	0.4	1.23	1.1	3.78
10	"Cold Cold Man"	December 17, 2019	0.7/4	2.52	0.4	1.29	1.1	3.82
11	"Can't Truss 'Em"	March 3, 2020	0.6	2.43	0.4	1.29	1.0	3.72
12	"Talk Less"	March 10, 2020	0.6	1.89	0.3	1.21	0.9	3.10
13	"Come Undone"	March 17, 2020	0.7	2.64	—N/a	1.15	—N/a	3.80
14	"I Am Who I Am"	March 24, 2020	0.7	2.72	0.4	1.18	1.1	3.90
15	"Love Me Still"	March 31, 2020	0.6	2.58	0.5	1.21	1.1	3.79
16	"We Got Us"	April 7, 2020	0.7	2.80	0.4	1.12	1.1	3.92
17	"Over Everything"	April 14, 2020	0.7	2.69	0.4	1.09	1.1	3.78
18	"Home is on the Way"	April 21, 2020	0.8	2.94	TBD	TBD	TBD	TBD
