= Empire season 1 =

Empire
- Season 1
- DVD cover
- Starring: Terrence Howard; Taraji P. Henson; Bryshere Y. Gray; Jussie Smollett; Trai Byers; Grace Gealey; Malik Yoba; Kaitlin Doubleday
- No. of episodes: 12

Release
- Original network: Fox
- Original release: January 7 – March 18, 2015

Season chronology
- Next → Season 2

The first season of the American television series Empire premiered on January 7, 2015, and concluded on March 18, 2015, on Fox. The series centers around a hip hop music and entertainment company, Empire Entertainment, and the drama among the members of the founders' family as they fight for control. The show aired on Wednesdays at 9:00 pm ET. The season consisted of 12 episodes.

The first episode was watched by 9.90 million viewers and achieved an adult 18-49 rating/share of 3.8/11, making it the biggest series launch for the network since Touch premiered in 2012. The viewership of the series rose every single week, with the season finale, which aired on March 18, 2015, being watched by 17.62 million viewers and achieving an adult 18-49 rating/share of 6.9/21.

== Premise ==
The show centers around a hip hop music and entertainment company, Empire Entertainment, and the drama among the members of the founders' family as they fight for control of the company.

== Cast and characters ==
=== Main cast ===
- Terrence Howard as Lucious Lyon
- Taraji P. Henson as Cookie Lyon
- Bryshere Y. Gray as Hakeem Lyon
- Jussie Smollett as Jamal Lyon
- Trai Byers as Andre Lyon
- Grace Gealey as Anika Calhoun
- Malik Yoba as Vernon Turner
- Kaitlin Doubleday as Rhonda Lyon

=== Recurring cast ===
- Gabourey Sidibe as Becky Williams
- Rafael de la Fuente as Michael Sanchez
- Tasha Smith as Carol Hardaway
- Serayah as Tiana Brown
- Damon Gupton as Detective Calvin Walker
- Nealla Gordon as Agent Harlow Carter
- Ta'Rhonda Jones as Porsha Taylor
- AzMarie Livingston as Chicken
- Naomi Campbell as Camilla Marks
- Judd Nelson as Billy Baretti
- Derek Luke as Malcolm DeVeaux
- Jennifer Hudson as Michelle
- Courtney Love as Elle Dallas

=== Guest appearances ===
- Raven-Symoné as Olivia Lyon
- Cuba Gooding Jr. as Dwayne "Puma" Robinson
- Gladys Knight as herself
- Anthony Hamilton as himself
- Sway Calloway as himself
- DeRay Davis as Jermel
- Estelle as Delphine
- Mary J. Blige as Angie
- Snoop Dogg as himself
- Rita Ora as herself
- Juicy J as himself
- Patti LaBelle as herself
- Charles Hamilton as himself

== Production ==
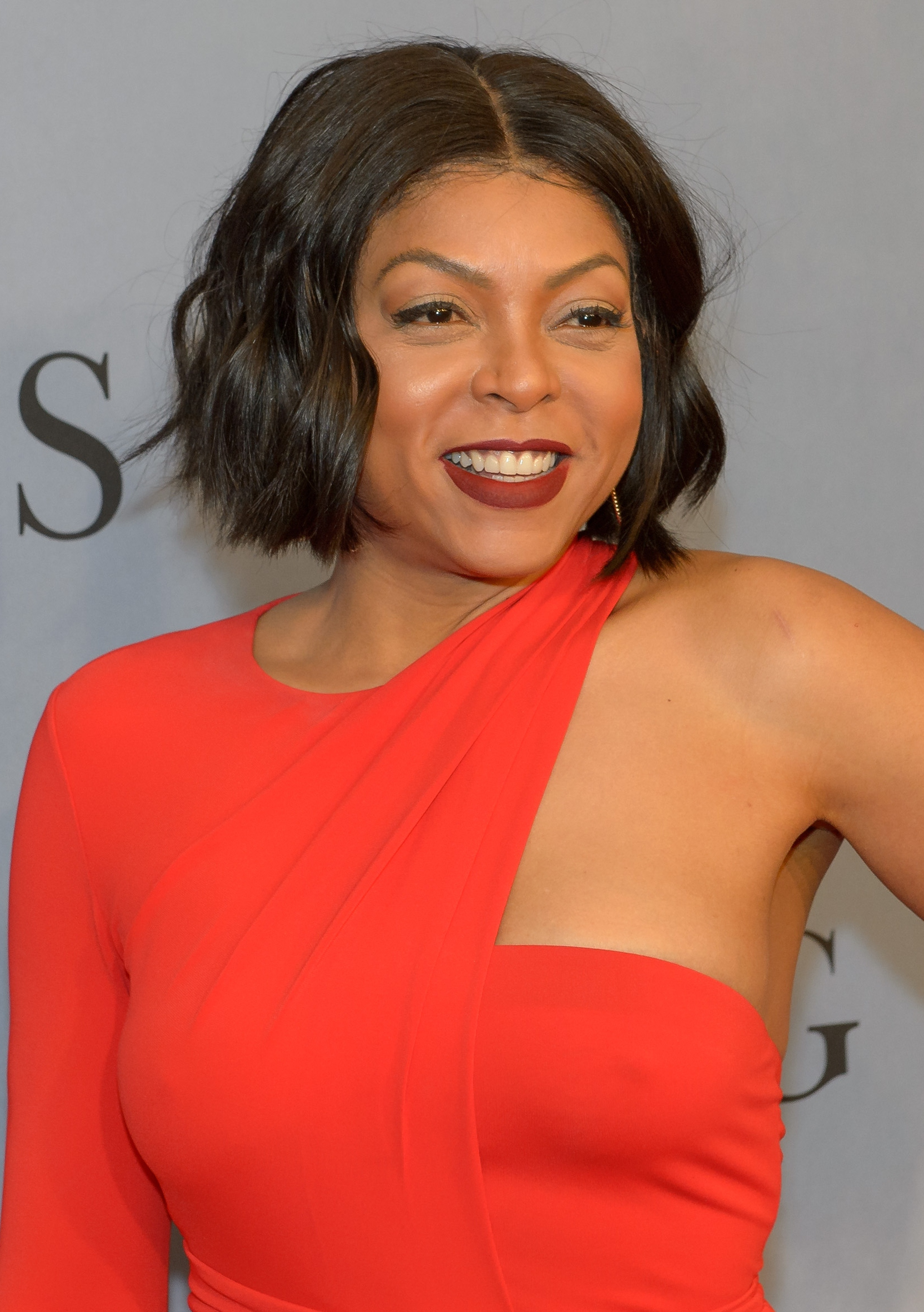
Taraji P. Henson portrays Cookie Lyon

=== Casting ===
Howard was cast in the lead on February 19, 2014. Henson was named as the female lead on February 26, and Jussie Smollett was announced in a starring role. Howard and Henson previously starred together as love interests in the film Hustle & Flow. On March 10, 2014, Sidibe, who had previously worked with Daniels in Precious, was cast in a recurring role as Becky, Lucious' assistant. Trai Byers and Grace Gealey were announced in regular roles, while Bryshere Y. Gray and Malik Yoba were announced in starring roles. Naomi Campbell was announced in a recurring role on September 29. Courtney Love was added to the cast on October 23.

== Episodes ==
No. overall	No. in season	Title	Directed by	Written by	Original release date	Prod. code	U.S. viewers (millions)
1	1	"Pilot"	Lee Daniels	Lee Daniels & Danny Strong	January 7, 2015	1AXP01	9.90
Lucious Lyon, CEO of Empire Entertainment, is preparing for Empire's upcoming IPO when he is diagnosed with ALS and is given only three years to live. While keeping his condition secret, he announces to appoint one of his three sons as his successor. Meanwhile, Lucious' ex-wife, Loretha 'Cookie' Lyon is released from prison after 17 years and demands half of Empire, which Lucious refuses. Hakeem, their youngest son, is a talented rapper, but spoiled. He barely remembers Cookie and resents her. Cookie favors Jamal, their talented middle son, as future boss of Empire, but Lucious has always despised him for his homosexuality and considers it detrimental for his career. Andre, their eldest son, is the Empire CFO. However, he has no musical talent, which Lucious considers a prerequisite to being CEO. He and his wife Rhonda are both ambitious and plan to turn the rest of the family against each other in order to gain control. Cookie threatens to tell the SEC that her initial investment was drug money and eventually signs a nondisclosure agreement, in exchange for a position as manager for Jamal's career. Bunkie tries to blackmail Lucious, threatening to report murders committed by Lucious previously, and is shot by Lucious.
2	2	"The Outspoken King"	Lee Daniels	Danny Strong & Ilene Chaiken	January 14, 2015	1AXP02	10.32
Rhonda reminds Andre to attend his doctor appointments for his bipolar disorder. Lucious' assistant Becky discovers his ALS medication. Hakeem befriends Tiana Brown, an artist at Empire. He later causes a scandal at an expensive restaurant. Lucious has to defend Empire's IPO launch after one of its artists is involved in a shooting. Bunkie's body is found, he was Cookie's cousin and a long-time friend of the family. Lucious plans to introduce Hakeem at Club Laviticus. Instigated by Andre, Cookie wants Jamal to perform there, too, but Lucious refuses, so Cookie sets up a press conference for Jamal. Lucious threatens Jamal to withdraw his financial support if he comes out publicly, so they cancel. In the end, Hakeem chooses Jamal to perform together with. FBI Agent Carter wants Cookie to testify in court about what she had witnessed, as an extension to their deal, but Cookie fears for her life.
3	3	"The Devil Quotes Scripture"	Sanaa Hamri	Ilene Chaiken & Joshua Allen	January 21, 2015	1AXP03	11.07
Lucious learns from the police that they found an eye witness to Bunkie’s murder. Andre uses his personal relations with deputy mayor Alvarez to find out that the witness is a homeless person. He identifies Lucious to Detective Walker but is not mentally fit to testify officially. The Lyons take a trip to Philadelphia for Bunkie's funeral and during the ceremony, Lucious recalls his drug dealing past. Anika had Cookie followed and presents Lucious photos how she met with the FBI. To protect the cover, Cookie introduces Carter as her parole officer. Hakeem publicly dates Tiana sanctioned by Lucious, but secretly meets his girlfriend Camilla Marks. During a family dinner, Lucious and Jamal get into an argument, which eventually makes Jamal leave his apartment that is paid for by his father.
4	4	"False Imposition"	Rosemary Rodriguez	Wendy Calhoun	January 28, 2015	1AXP04	11.36
Lucious wants to contract popular rapper Titan, stealing him from his rival Beretti. However, Titan is in jail after shooting someone. Cookie helps by meeting his mother. Lucious can eventually contract Titan, even if his money will be used to support the Nation of Islam which was involved in killing his father. Anika arranges a duet with Hakeem and Tiana. As Tiana’s new manager, Cookie becomes involved and tries to forge a relationship with Hakeem over their work. Tiana is upset when she catches Hakeem with Camilla but still performs with him professionally. Andre gives Detective Walker a false alibi for Lucious for the time of Bunkie’s murder. Jamal and Michael move into a simple apartment and Jamal tries to find inspiration for his original music.
5	5	"Dangerous Bonds"	John Singleton	Malcolm Spellman	February 4, 2015	1AXP05	11.47
Andre wants Tiana to guest on Hakeem's music video. Cookie agrees in return for a board seat. Rhonda films Tiana make out with her girlfriend India and publishes the film on the Internet, causing a scene between Hakeem and Tiana amidst the video shoot. Lucious convinces Hakeem to proceed anyway. Andre hints Hakeem's friends to rob Jamal who is at a recording studio in the Bronx on his own money. The sound engineer is injured. Jamal still manages to record his song. He is angry at Hakeem because he recognized the robbers as his friends. Cookie testifies before a grand jury against Frank Gathers. She mistakes a red rose that Lucious had left on her doorstep for their anniversary as a threat for retaliation and orders a hit on Frank’s gangster Teddy McNally. When she finds out the truth it is too late to stop. Lucious proposes to Anika. He also asks Anika's father, a medical doctor, to sign a false health certificate which he needs for his IPO.
6	6	"Out, Damned Spot"	Michael Engler	Eric Haywood	February 11, 2015	1AXP06	11.96
Detective Walker is investigating against Lucious. Vernon finds out about the murder and the alibi, and Andre, too, finds out that Lucious killed Bunkie. Vernon pays someone to take the blame for the murder with a false confession to the police. Elle Dallas is a long-time artist of Empire but has lost success recently and has let herself go. To prevent her from getting fired, Cookie starts as her manager. Lucious' doctor offers an experimental treatment. Jamal's new song is a success. As he focusses on his career, Michael becomes unhappy about their relationship. Jamal's ex-wife Olivia arrives with a little girl, Lola, who she claims is their daughter.
7	7	"Our Dancing Days"	Sanaa Hamri	Attica Locke	February 18, 2015	1AXP07	13.02
Michael feels neglected and leaves Jamal. Lucious lands in hospital from the side effects of the experimental drug. Olivia has vanished, leaving behind Lola at Empire, so she has to be taken care of. For an investor party, Lucious wants to present Empire as a family-run company, so Cookie needs to bring Hakeem and Jamal back working together. Camilla is tired of having to be the secret girlfriend; Hakeem smuggles her on the guest list as an investor. At the party, Jamal and Hakeem perform well. Cookie wants Elle to open, but Anika spikes her drink. His condition makes it impossible for Lucious to give his prepared speech about family values, but Cookie saves the evening. After the party, Lucious reveals to his family that he suffers from ALS; Andre has a breakdown. Cookie and Lucious are caught making love by Anika.
8	8	"The Lyon's Roar"	Danny Strong	Danny Strong	February 25, 2015	1AXP08	13.90
After finding out that Lucious slept with Cookie and that her father faked him a clean bill of health, Anika forces Lucious to announce their upcoming wedding at the White Party, threatening him to ruin him if he won’t. However, Lucious has promised Cookie that he will leave Anika. As part of a family legacy and to reconcile everybody, Lucious wants Cookie, Jamal, Hakeem and him to record a song together. Andre feels left out and tries to be voted interim CEO in case Lucious becomes incapacitated, also using Rhonda to secure him the votes of the board, but Lucious refuses. At the White Party, Hakeem brings along Camilla who starts fighting with Cookie over the course of Hakeem’s career. Lucious brings along Anika, but before they can announce the wedding, Cookie tells her that she slept with Lucious just the night before. Anika leaves angrily and goes to meet Lucious' longtime rival, Billy Beretti. Jamal comes out by singing a remix of Lucious' classic song 'You're So Beautiful'. After the party, Lucious ends the Lyons legacy album. Andre attempts suicide but the gun jams.
9	9	"Unto the Breach"	Anthony Hemingway	David Rambo	March 4, 2015	1AXP09	14.33
Cookie finds out about Anika conspiring with Billy Beretti while she still pretends to plan the wedding with Lucious. He throws her out and reminds her that if they make his disease public, her father will go to prison for faking the health certificate. Lucious calls the whole family in to fight the war for the best artists against his rival. Jamal meets famous artist Delphine and they get along very well. Her contract is ending and he wants her for Empire, which Lucious ignores at first, but in the end he contracts her. Anika tries to steal Tiana but eventually Cookie and Hakeem work together and convince her to stay. Furious, Andre throws away his medication and then successively loses control until he has to be subdued and committed to a mental hospital.
10	10	"Sins of the Father"	Rob Hardy	Eddie Gonzalez & Jeremy Haft	March 11, 2015	1AXP10	14.90
Cookie learns about Andre’s bipolar disorder at the hospital. He needs to sign the papers for the IPO but does not want to leave, so Rhonda acts as his proxy. Meanwhile, Andre is working with his musical therapist Michelle. Jamal decides to raise Lola. Lucious plans to marry Cookie and wants to give part of the shares that were intended for his sons to her. However, Cookie makes it clear she is finished with Lucious, and is approaching Malcolm. Camilla gains influence on Hakeem, but Lucious wants to get rid of her as he thinks she is only using him. He offers her money to leave Hakeem, but she refuses and threatens to return once he is dead. Olivia was hiding from Reggie who abused her and Lola, but he finds her. Vernon brings them to the Lyons' where Reggie demands to get Lola back. To save Jamal, Lucious reveals that Lola is his child and that he had promised Olivia to make her a star as long as she stays with Jamal as his beard. Malcolm shoots Reggie.
11	11	"Die But Once"	Mario Van Peebles	Ilene Chaiken	March 18, 2015	1AXP11	15.82
Lucious fires Cookie after she spent a weekend with Malcolm. Hakeem is angry about Camilla: He publicly shames Lucious in a freestyle and plans to sign with Beretti. After finding God through Michelle, Andre wants to leave Empire. Lucious takes revenge by wooing Michelle with a gospel record contract. Jamal gets closer with Ryan. Beretti takes legal action against Empire. When Jamal’s new album is a big success, Lucious promises him to become his successor if he has what it takes to deal with Beretti. In return, Jamal wants Lucious to bring Cookie back. At Creedmoor, Lucious catches Hakeem with Anika, and Jamal threatens Beretti to sign over the masters back to Empire. Later, Lucious learns he really suffers from MG, which is treatable. Cookie hears a sedated Lucious sleep-talk how he murdered her cousin Bunkie, and she tries to kill him.
12	12	"Who I Am"	Debbie Allen	Danny Strong & Ilene Chaiken	March 18, 2015	1AXP12	17.62
Lucious officially names Jamal the successor CEO of Empire. Lucious suspects that Cookie tried to kill him, but she backed out at the last moment. Despite this, he fires her again. Hakeem, Anika, Andre, and Cookie have to overcome their antipathy when they plan a hostile takeover of Empire. Agent Carter wants Cookie to witness against Lucious, but she refuses. Vernon attempts to make amends with Andre, but they get into a fight that Rhonda intercedes by accidentally killing Vernon. Rhonda tells Andre not to call the police, and that she is pregnant. As Lucious gets ready to perform at his legacy concert, he is arrested for allegedly killing Bunkie. While Lucious thinks Cookie surrendered him to the police to take revenge and facilitate the takeover, Agent Carter's witness was really Vernon.

== Reception ==
=== Critical response ===
Empire was well received by critics, with most praising Taraji's performance as Cookie. On Rotten Tomatoes the show got a rating of 80% fresh based on 49 reviews.

Empire season 1: Critical reception by episode
Season 1 (2015): Percentage of positive critics' reviews tracked by the website Rotten Tomatoes

=== Live + SD ratings ===
No. in series	No. in season	Episode	Air date	Time slot (EST)	Rating/Share (18–49)	Viewers (m)	18–49 Rank	Viewership rank	Drama rank
1	1	"Pilot"	January 7, 2015	Wednesdays; 9:00 p.m.	3.8/11	9.90	5	17	1
2	2	"The Outspoken King"	January 14, 2015	Wednesdays; 9:00 p.m.	4.0/12	10.32	2	11	1
3	3	"The Devil Quotes Scripture"	January 21, 2015	Wednesdays; 9:00 p.m.	4.4/13	11.07	1	5	1
4	4	"False Imposition"	January 28, 2015	Wednesdays; 9:00 p.m.	4.3/12	11.36	5	9	2
5	5	"Dangerous Bonds"	February 4, 2015	Wednesdays; 9:00 p.m.	4.6/14	11.47	3	6	1
6	6	"Out, Damned Spot"	February 11, 2015	Wednesdays; 9:00 p.m.	4.8/14	11.96	2	4	1
7	7	"Our Dancing Days"	February 18, 2015	Wednesdays; 9:00 p.m.	5.2/15	13.02	3	9	1
8	8	"The Lyon’s Roar"	February 25, 2015	Wednesdays; 9:00 p.m.	5.4/15	13.90	1	5	1
9	9	"Unto the Breach"	March 4, 2015	Wednesdays; 9:00 p.m.	5.8/17	14.33	1	4	1
10	10	"Sins of the Father"	March 11, 2015	Wednesdays; 9:00 p.m.	5.8/17	14.90	1	3	1
11	11	"Die But Once"	March 18, 2015	8:00 p.m.	6.1/21	15.82	2	2	2
12	12	"Who I Am"	March 18, 2015	9:00 p.m.	6.9/21	17.62	1	1	1

=== Live + 7 Day (DVR) ratings ===
No. in series	No. in season	Episode	Air date	Time slot (EST)	18–49 rating increase	Viewers (millions) increase	Total 18–49	Total viewers (millions)	Ref
1	1	"Pilot"	January 7, 2015	Wednesdays; 9:00 p.m.	1.8	4.05	5.6	13.95	
2	2	"The Outspoken King"	January 14, 2015	Wednesdays; 9:00 p.m.	1.6	3.69	5.6	14.01	
3	3	"The Devil Quotes Scripture"	January 21, 2015	Wednesdays; 9:00 p.m.	1.9	4.06	6.3	15.13	
4	4	"False Imposition"	January 28, 2015	Wednesdays; 9:00 p.m.	1.8	3.69	6.1	15.04	
5	5	"Dangerous Bonds"	February 4, 2015	Wednesdays; 9:00 p.m.	2.0	4.21	6.6	15.68	
6	6	"Out, Damned Spot"	February 11, 2015	Wednesdays; 9:00 p.m.	1.8	4.14	6.6	16.10	
7	7	"Our Dancing Days"	February 18, 2015	Wednesdays; 9:00 p.m.	2.3	5.14	7.5	18.16	
8	8	"The Lyon’s Roar"	February 25, 2015	Wednesdays; 9:00 p.m.	2.3	5.08	7.7	18.98	
9	9	"Unto the Breach"	March 4, 2015	Wednesdays; 9:00 p.m.	2.5	5.35	8.3	19.68	
10	10	"Sins of the Father"	March 11, 2015	Wednesdays; 9:00 p.m.	2.7	5.70	8.5	20.63	
11	11	"Die But Once"	March 18, 2015	8:00 p.m.	2.6	5.74	8.7	21.56	
12	12	"Who I Am"	March 18, 2015	9:00 p.m.	2.4	5.49	9.3	23.12	
