= Empire season 4 =

Empire
- Season 4
- Promotional poster
- Starring: Terrence Howard; Taraji P. Henson; Bryshere Y. Gray; Jussie Smollett; Trai Byers; Grace Byers; Gabourey Sidibe; Ta'Rhonda Jones; Serayah McNeill; Xzibit; Rumer Willis; Terrell Carter; Andre Royo
- No. of episodes: 18

Release
- Original network: Fox
- Original release: September 27, 2017 – May 23, 2018

Season chronology
- ← Previous; Season 3 Next → Season 5

The fourth season of the American television drama series Empire premiered on September 27, 2017, in the United States on Fox. The fourth season was ordered on January 11, 2017, consisting of eighteen episodes. The show is produced by 20th Century Fox Television, in association with Imagine Entertainment, Lee Daniels Entertainment, Danny Strong Productions and Little Chicken Inc. The showrunners for this season are Ilene Chaiken, Danny Strong and Lee Daniels. The season aired on Wednesdays at 8:00 pm, a new slot. The premiere of the season also had a crossover with other Lee Daniels-created Fox series Star. The season concluded on May 23, 2018.

== Premise ==
The show centers around a hip hop music and entertainment company, Empire Entertainment, and the drama among the members of the founders' family as they fight for control of the company. After the explosive season 3 finale, Lucious has lost his memory and his family is trying to help him regain it, with the uncomfortable assistance from Nurse Claudia. The storyline also includes the war between the Lyons and the Dubois with Warren falling in love with Jamal, Andre receiving prescriptions from his psychiatrist and Hakeem meeting with Diana on a three-week basis until disaster strikes.

== Cast and characters ==
=== Main cast ===
- Terrence Howard as Lucious Lyon
- Taraji P. Henson as Cookie Lyon
- Bryshere Y. Gray as Hakeem Lyon
- Jussie Smollett as Jamal Lyon
- Trai Byers as Andre Lyon
- Grace Byers as Anika Calhoun
- Gabourey Sidibe as Becky Williams
- Ta'Rhonda Jones as Porsha Taylor
- Serayah as Tiana Brown
- Xzibit as Shyne Johnson
- Rumer Willis as Tory Ash
- Terrell Carter as Warren Hall
- Andre Royo as Thirsty Rawlings

=== Recurring cast ===
- Forest Whitaker as Eddie Barker
- Vivica A. Fox as Candace Holloway
- Demi Moore as Nurse Claudia
- Leslie Uggams as Leah Walker
- Taye Diggs as Angelo DuBois
- Phylicia Rashad as Diana DuBois
- Teyonah Parris as Detective Pamela Rose
- Charles D. Clark as Shyne's Main Goon
- V. Bozeman as Veronica
- Mo McRae as J Poppa
- Pej Vahdat as Kelly Patel
- Lizzy Leigh as Employee
- Chet Hanks as Blake
- Charles Malik Whitfield as Reverend L.C. Pryce
- Nicole Ari Parker as Giselle Barker
- Tasha Smith as Carol Holloway
- Alfre Woodard as Renee Holloway

=== Guest cast ===
- Queen Latifah as Carlotta Brown
- Funkmaster Flex as himself
- Tisha Campbell-Martin as Brooke
- Rhyon Nicole Brown as Maya
- Cassie Ventura as Haven Quinn
- Sierra McClain as Nessa Parker
- Magic Johnson as himself
- Eve as herself
- Kaitlin Doubleday as Rhonda Lyon

== Episodes ==
No. overall	No. in season	Title	Directed by	Written by	Original release date	Prod. code	U.S. viewers (millions)
49	1	"Noble Memory"	Sanaa Hamri	Brett Mahoney	September 27, 2017	4AXP01	7.05
Five months after the explosion in Las Vegas, Cookie helps Lucious prepare to make his first appearance to celebrate Empire's 20th anniversary, but Lucious still has no memory of himself or his family; as Cookie helps Lucious regain full control of his memory, she keeps a close eye on Lucious' new nurse, Claudia; Andre is faced with the investigation of the LAPD into Giuliana's whereabouts. Meanwhile, Diana continues to declare war on the Lyons and Carlotta Brown (Queen Latifah) makes a special appearance to visit Cookie and Lucious.
50	2	"Full Circle"	Craig Brewer	Craig Brewer & Eric Haywood	October 4, 2017	4AXP02	5.89
With his memory still lost, Lucious sneaks away under Claudia's watch to find out what type of person he was before the explosion in Vegas and receives a visit from Uncle Eddie, a longtime music icon and close friend of the Lyons. With Anika still in prison, Hakeem and Tiana grow closer, raising Bella together as a family. Cookie and Thirsty work together to get Anika out. Meanwhile, Cookie has a new project planned for Empire and Becky makes a bold move regarding Jamal's new song.
51	3	"Evil Manners"	Bille Woodruff	Matt Pyken & Carlito Rodriguez	October 11, 2017	4AXP03	5.93
Cookie reminisces over her years in prison when her line of credit is declined. She also begins to compare her past struggles to her life now. After Leah insists that he is a monster, Lucious struggles with his demons and pleads for his family to tell him how he wronged them in the past, but they are reluctant to tell him the truth. The LAPD is still on Andre's case about the events in Vegas, including Giuliana's disappearance, and Cookie encounters Diana at a magazine photoshoot.
52	4	"Bleeding War"	Sanaa Hamri	Diane Ademu-John & Jamie Rosengard	October 18, 2017	4AXP04	5.65
With Bella's birthday just around the corner, the family plans a special princes and princesses-themed party, including a special Prince tribute, but the events bring back haunting memories for a devastating Andre as he remembers his wife Rhonda died on the same day; all of Empire's top label artists compete for the 20-for-20's number one album, which inspires Jamal's direction for his new song; Lucious suddenly finds himself at a crossroads and tries to put to rest the anger from his past life; with help from Angelo, Anika files for sole custody of Bella.
53	5	"The Fool"	Howie Deutch	Janeika James & Jasheika James	November 8, 2017	4AXP05	5.40
When a news report on TMZ circles upon Lucious' memory, Cookie attempts to convince the board that he is fine, inviting the press to watch him produce the first 20-for-20 album. Eddie Barker steps in to help Lucious get his music-making mojo back. Worried about Bella being taken away from him and his involvement with the DuBois' clan becoming toxic, Hakeem plans to run to Cuba with Bella, but Cookie finds out. The relationship between Andre and Detective Pamela Rose heats up; she reveals information that was secretly uncovered regarding the explosion. Claudia helps Lucious with a breakthrough and, as Lucious finally gets his memory back, he kicks Claudia out of the house.
54	6	"Fortune Be Not Crost"	Sanaa Hamri	Joshua Allen & Dianne Houston	November 15, 2017	4AXP06	6.05
As the family prepares for the custody battle between Hakeem and Anika for Bella, the Lyons stand united supporting Hakeem; Hakeem gets upset at Tiana and blames her for running to Cookie about the Cuba trip, resulting in their break up; Andre sees a new therapist; Jamal thinks about introducing Warren to Lucious; Becky's old flame, J. Poppa, returns to Empire to record an album and rekindle his relationship with Becky; Diana returns from a trip and dark secrets are revealed upon her return, making Hakeem look bad at the trial and granting Anika full custody of Bella.
55	7	"The Lady Doth Protest"	Karen Gaviola	Matt Pyken & Eric Haywood	November 29, 2017	4AXP07	5.05
After dealing with the aftermath of Hakeem and Anika's custody battle, Empire's 20-for-20 production is put in jeopardy when Portia and Calvin go on strike after feeling unappreciated and overworked when Eddie Barker begins working as their new producer. Cookie strives to find a solution; Hakeem reaches out to Thirsty to find a way to get Bella back; Lucious attempts to arrange a deal with Anika on Hakeem's behalf; just as Jamal feels like his relationship with Warren is getting real, Warren's true colors are shown when the Lyons see him at dinner with Diana, causing the Lyons to plot for revenge.
56	8	"Cupid Painted Blind"	Elizabeth Allen Rosenbaum	Diane Ademu-John & Carlito Rodriguez	December 6, 2017	4AXP08	5.68
As they watch Diana DuBois' master scheme unfold, Cookie and Lucious take matters in their own hands to protect their family. Meanwhile, Andre begins to spiral out of control, wondering what she could have in store for him, Jamal's sobriety is put to the test, and Shyne gives Hakeem advice on how to maintain a balance between his work and personal life; in the end, Andre's love life with Pamela turned out to be imaginary due to the pills prescribed by the therapist that Diana hired.
57	9	"Slave to Memory"	Sanaa Hamri	Joshua Allen & Dianne Houston	December 13, 2017	4AXP09	5.95
After Andre winds up in the hospital due to his psychotic breakdown, Lucious vows to get revenge on the DuBois' once and for all. He hatches a plan that involves forcing Angelo to sign a written confession about Diana's actions. The Lyons then break into the Captain's Ball and Cookie gets on stage, exposing the truth about Diana with help from Warren. As Diana continues to try to get the police and Cookie continues to tell the guests about her actions, the police end up arresting Diana for kidnapping Bella, which forces Anika to give Bella back to Hakeem. Angelo attempts to kill Warren for betrayal and shoots him in the shoulder, but Jamal intervenes and, in a struggle, kills Angelo. Lucious then visits Andre to tell him the news, but Andre confesses in his sleep that he planted the car bomb. Before the information sinks in, Lucious is immediately drugged and kidnapped by Claudia, who has become obsessed with him.
58	10	"Birds in the Cage"	Craig Brewer	Craig Brewer	March 28, 2018	4AXP10	6.22
Jamal avoids jail time, as Warren gave a full account of what happened during Angelo’s death to the police. Cookie must race against time and use the skills she learned in prison to save Lucious from Claudia. Meanwhile, Andre, Jamal, and Hakeem pick up the pieces from their battle with the DuBois family. After learning about her pregnancy, Porsha becomes the friend that Becky needs in comfort. When Cookie finally comes to the rescue, she is knocked unconscious by Claudia and wakes up to see her hands tied to a table. Once Claudia is distracted, Cookie frees herself with a hidden razor in her hair. She fights Claudia, but Cookie gets tazed by her. At the same time, Lucious breaks the leg of the piano to which he is chained and hits Claudia. He picks up her ax, but then opts not to kill her and Claudia is arrested. Andre wakes up from a dream and convinces himself that he must tell Lucious about the car bomb.
59	11	"Without Apology"	Dianne Houston	Matt Pyken & Joshua Allen	April 4, 2018	4AXP11	5.57
On the brink of a lucrative tech deal, Eddie realizes that he must work on rebranding Empire. Cookie springs into action when a girl group from the past reunites and threatens to expose secrets about Empire and Lucious. Meanwhile, Hakeem proposes to Tiana, Andre struggles with guilt, and Becky is faced with a difficult situation. After the tech deal is finalized, Kelly Patel, the head of the company, is revealed to be plotting with Eddie to buy Empire. During a family dinner to celebrate Andre’s release from the hospital, Andre admits to Lucious that he planted the car bomb, enraging Lucious. Lucious whips him with a pistol and strangles him before the rest of the family intervenes. After the brothers leave the house, Cookie is distraught about the Andre situation and the mounting level of stress makes her suffer a heart attack, as Lucious frantically calls 911.
60	12	"Sweet Sorrow"	Eric Haywood	Eric Haywood & Jamie Rosengard	April 11, 2018	4AXP12	5.91
Lucious rallies the family together, just as Cookie is rushed to the hospital following her heart attack. Both Andre and Jamal try to right their wrongs and Jamal makes a shocking revelation on live TV with Robin Roberts. Eager to take Empire to new heights, Eddie's motives are questioned when the numbers don't add up. Meanwhile, Hakeem and Tiana find common ground with their new song. Becky reveals her pregnancy to J. Poppa and he later supports her decision to get an abortion. Lucious leaves Cookie under the care of her sisters Candace and Carol. Also, Cookie tries to handle both her health and her business, but realizes that she can't handle both at the same time.
61	13	"Of Hardiness is Mother"	Craig Brewer	Dianne Houston & Carlito Rodriguez	April 18, 2018	4AXP13	5.41
Although Lucious pressures Cookie to take it easy, she can't help but take matters into her own hands when she receives unsettling news about her friend from prison, Poundcake. After hearing the news that Poundcake has cancer, Cookie confronts Burleson, who raped Poundcake, about her daughter's whereabouts. Meanwhile, Tiana's new "20 for 20" single takes off, leading to an unexpected change in her demeanor. Also, Jamal struggles to rebrand his image, Hakeem adopts a new role as a musical mentor, and Andre recruits Lucious to help him uncover the truth about Eddie's intentions. Ultimately, both Lucious and Andre deal with the conflicting feelings in their strained relationship.
62	14	"False Face"	Millicent Shelton	Story by : Diane Ademu-John; Teleplay by : Janeika James & Jasheika James	April 25, 2018	4AXP14	5.34
Lucious and Thirsty try to squash Eddie's takeover by confronting him with legal papers. Cookie recalls her complex relationship with her mother while she continues her search for Poundcake's orphaned daughter. Meanwhile, Andre works on repairing his relationship with his brothers, Hakeem throws an underground party while anxiously preparing a release strategy for his 20 for 20 single, and Jamal and Tory try to find a new team to make their first non-Empire single. Also, Eddie joins forces with Anika in order to destroy the Lyons and take over Empire.
63	15	"A Lean and Hungry Look"	Bille Woodruff	Matt Pyken & Joshua Allen	May 2, 2018	4AXP15	5.28
As Eddie fights for his place at Empire Entertainment and gets the board on his side, Lucious and Shyne must find a permanent solution to keep him out. Meanwhile, Cookie tries to get Maya to see Poundcake one last time before it's too late. At the hospital cell, Poundcake's condition worsens and Maya reads the letter that Poundcake wrote to her, letting her know that she loves her and that she never intended to give her up. Poundcake dies right before Maya has the chance to get to know her. When tensions rise in Jamal and Tory's new band, Preacher Azal inspires Jamal with an idea to get everyone in sync. Lucious lures Shyne into a trap after finding out that he also had something to do with the explosion and his security guard shoots and kills Shyne. In the end, Cookie finally visits her mother to try to fix their strained relationship.
64	16	"Fair Terms"	Jussie Smollett	Dianne Houston & Jamie Rosengard	May 9, 2018	4AXP16	5.02
Andre informs Lucious and Thirsty of Anika's efforts to convince Empire's board members to reject Eddie's resignation. In order to prove Anika's moves futile, they need Shyne's vote. Shyne, now deceased, is not available to outdo the support Anika has gained. At Shyne's memorial, Lucious approaches Tiffany to convince her to fill Shyne's seat at the board, but she declines on the grounds that Nessa was Shyne's protégé. She declines to come to their aid, but ultimately has a change of heart. Cookie realizes that her mother kept a watch on them over the years, prompting her to awaken their relationship. At the 20 for 20 concert, a photo emerges of Blake making the Nazi salute while his father holds a Confederate flag, putting Empire's reputation at risk. With Tiana and other artists rebelling against a racist label, they decline to distract the press. Eddie offers his help and Lucious vehemently refuses, but the board accepts. Tension rises between Lucious and Eddie in the glare of the cameras, as the latter practically strips the former of his Empire.
65	17	"Bloody Noses and Crack'd Crowns"	Howard Deutch	Carlito Rodriguez	May 16, 2018	4AXP17	5.14
Eddie's return to Empire is welcomed eagerly by the board, which overrules the Lyons. Cookie convinces a despondent and raging Lucious that their only option is to buy back Empire. Jamal and Tory's new team, Anonymous, is celebrating in the wake of their covert rise to stardom during the previous episode, but tensions rise when Tory prioritizes the music over the band's wishes for fame and fortune. When Eddie starts preempting the Lyons' attempts to attract investors, Andre pretends to change sides to try and leak Eddie's buyout amount to Lucious; Cookie is inspired to throw a "rent party"-esque concert to be streamed live on Empire X-Stream and raise the amount through crowdfunding. Blake denounces his father's racist ways on live TV, generating a sympathy wave for the Lyons. Lucious confronts Jamal about Anonymous and attempts to recruit them to no avail. Eddie reveals he was on to Andre and attempts to sway him into shutting the X-Stream servers down in exchange for being CFO for Kelly Patel; Andre pretends to comply, but instead disables the paywall, sending the concert live across the internet. Jamal convinces Anonymous (initially minus Tory) to appear in public at the Rent Party concert, while Lucious and Cookie sway support with an impassioned speech. The Lyons manage to meet their crowdfunding goals, with Cookie and Lucious finally rekindling their love in the process, but Eddie confronts them with physical evidence tying Lucious to Shyne’s murder and threatens to turn him in to the police unless the Lyons cease all attempts to buy back Empire.
66	18	"The Empire Unpossess'd"	Craig Brewer	Brett Mahoney & Joshua Allen	May 23, 2018	4AXP18	5.30
Eddie demands the profits from the eventual sale of Empire to Kelly Patel in return for securing Lucious' freedom. As other suggestions to save Empire prove contentious, Cookie meets up with Anika to ask for her help in retrieving the compromising evidence of Lucious' hand in Shyne's murder. Tory becomes increasingly uncomfortable with Anonymous being known to the public and, as a consequence, loses her sobriety, sending her back to rehab, where she dies after suffering a seizure. When a meeting is convened for the Empire bidding, Kelly Patel offers $700 million while the Lyons offer nothing. It turns out Cookie offered Empire in exchange for Lucious' freedom. Andre and Anika call a truce over their past differences, a scheme plotted by Andre who slips powdered pills into her drink. During a press conference, Anika starts feeling giddy and suffers from hallucinations of Rhonda; she later falls from a balcony and dies. To stay away from the spotlight, Jamal moves away. Lucious and Cookie get married in private at City Hall. A shootout by Blake's father puts Hakeem, Blake, Bella, and Tiana's lives on the line.

== Reception ==
=== Ratings ===
Viewership and ratings per episode of Empire season 4
No.	Title	Air date	Rating/share (18–49)	Viewers (millions)	DVR (18–49)	DVR viewers (millions)	Total (18–49)	Total viewers (millions)
1	"Noble Memory"	September 27, 2017	2.4/9	7.05	1.2	2.77	3.6	9.82
2	"Full Circle"	October 4, 2017	1.9/7	5.89	1.1	—	3.0	—
3	"Evil Manners"	October 11, 2017	2.0/8	5.93	1.0	—	3.0	—
4	"Bleeding War"	October 18, 2017	1.8/7	5.65	1.0	—	2.8	—
5	"The Fool"	November 8, 2017	1.8/7	5.40	1.0	2.52	2.8	7.92
6	"Fortune Be Not Crost"	November 15, 2017	2.0/8	6.05	1.0	—	3.0	—
7	"The Lady Doth Protest"	November 29, 2017	1.7/6	5.05	1.0	2.52	2.7	7.57
8	"Cupid Painted Blind"	December 6, 2017	1.8/7	5.68	1.0	2.35	2.8	8.03
9	"Slave to Memory"	December 13, 2017	1.9/7	5.95	—	—	—	—
10	"Birds in the Cage"	March 28, 2018	2.0/8	6.22	0.9	2.44	2.9	8.66
11	"Without Apology"	April 4, 2018	1.8/7	5.57	0.9	2.35	2.7	7.93
12	"Sweet Sorrow"	April 11, 2018	1.9/8	5.91	0.8	2.13	2.7	8.04
13	"Of Hardiness is Mother"	April 18, 2018	1.8/7	5.41	0.8	—	2.6	—
14	"False Face"	April 25, 2018	1.7/7	5.34	0.8	2.07	2.5	7.41
15	"A Lean and Hungry Look"	May 2, 2018	1.7/7	5.28	0.9	—	2.6	—
16	"Fair Terms"	May 9, 2018	1.6/7	5.02	0.9	—	2.5	—
17	"Bloody Noses and Crack'd Crowns"	May 16, 2018	1.6/7	5.14	0.8	2.12	2.4	7.27
18	"The Empire Unpossess'd"	May 23, 2018	1.7/8	5.30	0.8	2.11	2.5	7.41
