= List of Empire episodes =

Empire is an American musical drama television series which debuted on Fox on January 7, 2015. The show centers around a hip hop music and Entertainment Company, Empire Records, and the drama among the members of the founders' family as they fight for control of the company. The series was created by Lee Daniels and Danny Strong, and stars Terrence Howard and Taraji P. Henson. The series' sixth and final season premiered on September 24, 2019, and concluded on April 21, 2020.

== Series overview ==
Season	Episodes	Originally released		Rank	Viewers (millions)
Season	Episodes	First released	Last released	Rank	Viewers (millions)
1	12	January 7, 2015	March 18, 2015	5	17.33
2	18	September 23, 2015	May 18, 2016	5	15.94
3	18	September 21, 2016	May 24, 2017	23	10.37
4	18	September 27, 2017	May 23, 2018	52	7.45
5	18	September 26, 2018	May 8, 2019	68	6.38
6	18	September 24, 2019	April 21, 2020	80	4.04

== Episodes ==
=== Season 1 (2015) ===
No. overall	No. in season	Title	Directed by	Written by	Original release date	Prod. code	U.S. viewers (millions)
1	1	"Pilot"	Lee Daniels	Lee Daniels & Danny Strong	January 7, 2015	1AXP01	9.90
2	2	"The Outspoken King"	Lee Daniels	Danny Strong & Ilene Chaiken	January 14, 2015	1AXP02	10.32
3	3	"The Devil Quotes Scripture"	Sanaa Hamri	Ilene Chaiken & Joshua Allen	January 21, 2015	1AXP03	11.07
4	4	"False Imposition"	Rosemary Rodriguez	Wendy Calhoun	January 28, 2015	1AXP04	11.36
5	5	"Dangerous Bonds"	John Singleton	Malcolm Spellman	February 4, 2015	1AXP05	11.47
6	6	"Out, Damned Spot"	Michael Engler	Eric Haywood	February 11, 2015	1AXP06	11.96
7	7	"Our Dancing Days"	Sanaa Hamri	Attica Locke	February 18, 2015	1AXP07	13.02
8	8	"The Lyon's Roar"	Danny Strong	Danny Strong	February 25, 2015	1AXP08	13.90
9	9	"Unto the Breach"	Anthony Hemingway	David Rambo	March 4, 2015	1AXP09	14.33
10	10	"Sins of the Father"	Rob Hardy	Eddie Gonzalez & Jeremy Haft	March 11, 2015	1AXP10	14.90
11	11	"Die But Once"	Mario Van Peebles	Ilene Chaiken	March 18, 2015	1AXP11	15.82
12	12	"Who I Am"	Debbie Allen	Danny Strong & Ilene Chaiken	March 18, 2015	1AXP12	17.62

=== Season 2 (2015–16) ===
No. overall	No. in season	Title	Directed by	Written by	Original release date	Prod. code	U.S. viewers (millions)
13	1	"The Devils Are Here"	Lee Daniels	Danny Strong & Ilene Chaiken	September 23, 2015	2AXP01	16.18
14	2	"Without a Country"	Dee Rees	Carlito Rodriguez	September 30, 2015	2AXP02	13.74
15	3	"Fires of Heaven"	Craig Brewer	Attica Locke	October 7, 2015	2AXP03	13.10
16	4	"Poor Yorick"	Danny Strong	Danny Strong	October 14, 2015	2AXP04	12.22
17	5	"Be True"	Kevin Bray	Wendy Calhoun & Janeika James	October 21, 2015	2AXP05	12.28
18	6	"A High Hope for a Low Heaven"	Mario Van Peebles	Robert Munic	November 4, 2015	2AXP06	11.68
19	7	"True Love Never"	Sylvain White	Ingrid Escajeda	November 11, 2015	2AXP07	11.20
20	8	"My Bad Parts"	Sanaa Hamri	Malcolm Spellman	November 18, 2015	2AXP08	11.34
21	9	"Sinned Against"	Paul McCrane	Eric Haywood	November 25, 2015	2AXP09	9.21
22	10	"Et Tu, Brute?"	Sanaa Hamri	Radha Blank	December 2, 2015	2AXP10	11.81
23	11	"Death Will Have His Day"	Danny Strong	Danny Strong	March 30, 2016	2AXP11	12.46
24	12	"A Rose by Any Other Name"	Michael Engler	Ilene Chaiken	April 6, 2016	2AXP12	11.34
25	13	"The Tameness of a Wolf"	Paris Barclay	Attica Locke & Joshua Allen	April 13, 2016	2AXP13	10.11
26	14	"Time Shall Unfold"	Cherien Dabis	Ayanna Floyd Davis	April 20, 2016	2AXP14	9.56
27	15	"More Than Kin"	Sanaa Hamri	Eric Haywood & Malcolm Spellman	April 27, 2016	2AXP15	10.03
28	16	"The Lyon Who Cried Wolf"	Millicent Shelton	Joshua Allen	May 4, 2016	2AXP16	9.39
29	17	"Rise by Sin"	Paul McCrane	Ayanna Floyd Davis & Jamie Rosengard	May 11, 2016	2AXP17	9.81
30	18	"Past Is Prologue"	Sanaa Hamri	Lee Daniels & Ilene Chaiken	May 18, 2016	2AXP18	10.88

=== Season 3 (2016–17) ===
No. overall	No. in season	Title	Directed by	Written by	Original release date	Prod. code	U.S. viewers (millions)
31	1	"Light in Darkness"	Sanaa Hamri	Malcolm Spellman & Joshua Allen	September 21, 2016	3AXP01	10.87
32	2	"Sin That Amends"	Craig Brewer	Cherien Dabis & Carlito Rodriguez	September 28, 2016	3AXP02	9.65
33	3	"What Remains Is Bestial"	Millicent Shelton	Diane Ademu-John & Eric Haywood	October 5, 2016	3AXP03	9.25
34	4	"Cupid Kills"	Hanelle Culpepper	Matt Pyken & Attica Locke	October 12, 2016	3AXP04	9.27
35	5	"One Before Another"	Mario Van Peebles	Joshua Allen & Carlito Rodriguez	November 9, 2016	3AXP05	8.15
36	6	"Chimes at Midnight"	Sanaa Hamri	Cherien Dabis & Eric Haywood	November 16, 2016	3AXP06	8.39
37	7	"What We May Be"	Kevin Bray	Diane Ademu-John & Malcom Spellman	November 30, 2016	3AXP07	7.84
38	8	"The Unkindest Cut"	Dennie Gordon	Attica Locke & Jamie Rosengard	December 7, 2016	3AXP08	7.00
39	9	"A Furnace for Your Foe"	Sanaa Hamri	Ilene Chaiken & Matt Pyken	December 14, 2016	3AXP09	7.58
40	10	"Sound and Fury"	Craig Brewer	Eric Haywood & Carlito Rodriguez	March 22, 2017	3AXP10	7.95
41	11	"Play On"	Benny Boom	Story by : Malcolm Spellman; Teleplay by : Janeika James & Jasheika James	March 29, 2017	3AXP11	6.91
42	12	"Strange Bedfellows"	Bille Woodruff	Matt Pyken & Attica Locke	April 5, 2017	3AXP12	6.35
43	13	"My Naked Villainy"	Cherien Dabis	Joshua Allen & Jamie Rosengard	April 12, 2017	3AXP13	6.59
44	14	"Love Is a Smoke"	Tricia Brock	Diane Ademu-John & Cherien Dabis	April 26, 2017	3AXP14	6.31
45	15	"Civil Hands Unclean"	Howard Deutch	Ilene Chaiken & Carlito Rodriguez	May 3, 2017	3AXP15	5.60
46	16	"Absent Child"	Millicent Shelton	Attica Locke & Malcolm Spellman	May 10, 2017	3AXP16	6.32
47	17	"Toil & Trouble, Pt. 1"	Craig Brewer	Diane Ademu-John & Eric Haywood	May 17, 2017	3AXP17	6.14
48	18	"Toil & Trouble, Pt. 2"	Sanaa Hamri	Ilene Chaiken & Joshua Allen	May 24, 2017	3AXP18	6.94

=== Season 4 (2017–18) ===
No. overall	No. in season	Title	Directed by	Written by	Original release date	Prod. code	U.S. viewers (millions)
49	1	"Noble Memory"	Sanaa Hamri	Brett Mahoney	September 27, 2017	4AXP01	7.05
50	2	"Full Circle"	Craig Brewer	Craig Brewer & Eric Haywood	October 4, 2017	4AXP02	5.89
51	3	"Evil Manners"	Bille Woodruff	Matt Pyken & Carlito Rodriguez	October 11, 2017	4AXP03	5.93
52	4	"Bleeding War"	Sanaa Hamri	Diane Ademu-John & Jamie Rosengard	October 18, 2017	4AXP04	5.65
53	5	"The Fool"	Howie Deutch	Janeika James & Jasheika James	November 8, 2017	4AXP05	5.40
54	6	"Fortune Be Not Crost"	Sanaa Hamri	Joshua Allen & Dianne Houston	November 15, 2017	4AXP06	6.05
55	7	"The Lady Doth Protest"	Karen Gaviola	Matt Pyken & Eric Haywood	November 29, 2017	4AXP07	5.05
56	8	"Cupid Painted Blind"	Elizabeth Allen Rosenbaum	Diane Ademu-John & Carlito Rodriguez	December 6, 2017	4AXP08	5.68
57	9	"Slave to Memory"	Sanaa Hamri	Joshua Allen & Dianne Houston	December 13, 2017	4AXP09	5.95
58	10	"Birds in the Cage"	Craig Brewer	Craig Brewer	March 28, 2018	4AXP10	6.22
59	11	"Without Apology"	Dianne Houston	Matt Pyken & Joshua Allen	April 4, 2018	4AXP11	5.57
60	12	"Sweet Sorrow"	Eric Haywood	Eric Haywood & Jamie Rosengard	April 11, 2018	4AXP12	5.91
61	13	"Of Hardiness is Mother"	Craig Brewer	Dianne Houston & Carlito Rodriguez	April 18, 2018	4AXP13	5.41
62	14	"False Face"	Millicent Shelton	Story by : Diane Ademu-John; Teleplay by : Janeika James & Jasheika James	April 25, 2018	4AXP14	5.34
63	15	"A Lean and Hungry Look"	Bille Woodruff	Matt Pyken & Joshua Allen	May 2, 2018	4AXP15	5.28
64	16	"Fair Terms"	Jussie Smollett	Dianne Houston & Jamie Rosengard	May 9, 2018	4AXP16	5.02
65	17	"Bloody Noses and Crack'd Crowns"	Howard Deutch	Carlito Rodriguez	May 16, 2018	4AXP17	5.14
66	18	"The Empire Unpossess'd"	Craig Brewer	Brett Mahoney & Joshua Allen	May 23, 2018	4AXP18	5.30

=== Season 5 (2018–19) ===
No. overall	No. in season	Title	Directed by	Written by	Original release date	Prod. code	U.S. viewers (millions)
67	1	"Steal from the Thief"	Sanaa Hamri	Brett Mahoney & Dianne Houston	September 26, 2018	5AXP01	6.09
68	2	"Pay for Their Presumptions"	John Krokidas	Yolonda E. Lawrence & Carlito Rodriguez	October 3, 2018	5AXP02	5.09
69	3	"Pride"	Clement Virgo	Diane Ademu-John & Joshua Allen	October 10, 2018	5AXP03	5.15
70	4	"Love All, Trust a Few"	Mario Van Peebles	Matt Pyken & Cameron Johnson	October 17, 2018	5AXP04	5.21
71	5	"The Depth of Grief"	Elizabeth Allen Rosenbaum	Janeika James & Jasheika James & Jamie Rosengard	October 31, 2018	5AXP05	4.23
72	6	"What Is Done"	Jussie Smollett	Felicia D. Henderson & Thomas Westfall	November 7, 2018	5AXP06	5.01
73	7	"Treasons, Stratagems, and Spoils"	Tamra Davis	Joshua Allen & Dianne Houston	November 14, 2018	5AXP07	4.89
74	8	"Master of What Is Mine Own"	Dianne Houston	Matt Pyken & Yolonda E. Lawrence	November 28, 2018	5AXP08	5.03
75	9	"Had It from My Father"	Sanaa Hamri	Diane Ademu-John & Carlito Rodriguez	December 5, 2018	5AXP09	5.04
76	10	"My Fault Is Past"	Michael Goi	Craig Brewer & Cameron Johnson	March 13, 2019	5AXP10	4.40
77	11	"In Loving Virtue"	Clement Virgo	Felicia D. Henderson	March 20, 2019	5AXP11	3.98
78	12	"Shift and Save Yourself"	Dianne Houston	Matt Pyken & Thomas Westfall	March 27, 2019	5AXP12	3.97
79	13	"Hot Blood, Hot Thoughts, Hot Deeds"	Gabourey Sidibe	Diane Ademu-John & Evan Price	April 3, 2019	5AXP13	4.12
80	14	"Without All Remedy"	Craig Brewer	Jamie Rosengard	April 10, 2019	5AXP14	3.76
81	15	"A Wise Father That Knows His Own Child"	Dawn Wilkinson	Yolonda E. Lawrence & Carlito Rodriguez	April 17, 2019	5AXP15	3.76
82	16	"Never Doubt I Love"	Darren Grant	Joshua Allen & Thomas Westfall	April 24, 2019	5AXP16	3.77
83	17	"My Fate Cries Out"	Paul McCrane	Janeika James & Jasheika James & Cameron Johnson	May 1, 2019	5AXP17	3.73
84	18	"The Roughest Day"	Craig Brewer	Brett Mahoney & Felicia D. Henderson	May 8, 2019	5AXP18	4.09

=== Season 6 (2019–20) ===
No. overall	No. in season	Title	Directed by	Written by	Original release date	Prod. code	U.S. viewers (millions)
85	1	"What Is Love"	Sanaa Hamri	Dianne Houston & Brett Mahoney	September 24, 2019	6AXP01	3.31
86	2	"Got on My Knees to Pray"	Mario Van Peebles	Matt Pyken & Indira Gibson Wilson	October 1, 2019	6AXP02	2.94
87	3	"You Broke Love"	Howard Deutch	Yolonda E. Lawrence & Marcus J. Guillory	October 8, 2019	6AXP03	2.79
88	4	"Tell the Truth"	Bille Woodruff	Jamie Rosengard & Michael Martin	October 15, 2019	6AXP04	2.74
89	5	"Stronger Than My Rival"	Dawn Wilkinson	Janeika James & Jasheika James	November 5, 2019	6AXP05	2.48
90	6	"Heart of Stone"	Sanaa Hamri	Teleplay by : Stacy A. Littlejohn; Story by : Stacy A. Littlejohn & Thomas Westfall	November 12, 2019	6AXP06	2.60
91	7	"Good Enough"	Gabourey Sidibe	Cameron Johnson & Evan Price	November 19, 2019	6AXP07	2.65
92	8	"Do You Remember Me"	Ruben Garcia	Leah Benavides Rodriguez & Carlito Rodriguez	November 26, 2019	6AXP08	2.45
93	9	"Remember the Music"	Geary McLeod	Matt Pyken & Indira Gibson Wilson	December 3, 2019	6AXP09	2.55
94	10	"Cold Cold Man"	Sanaa Hamri	Dianne Houston & Jamie Rosengard	December 17, 2019	6AXP10	2.52
95	11	"Can't Truss 'Em"	Clement Virgo	Michael C. Martin & Cameron Johnson	March 3, 2020	6AXP11	2.43
96	12	"Talk Less"	Dawn Wilkinson	Stacy A. Littlejohn & Marcus J. Guillory	March 10, 2020	6AXP12	1.89
97	13	"Come Undone"	Taraji P. Henson	Dianne Houston & Evan Price	March 17, 2020	6AXP13	2.64
98	14	"I Am Who I Am"	Ishai Setton	Colin Waite & Paul Eriksen	March 24, 2020	6AXP14	2.72
99	15	"Love Me Still"	Dianne Houston	Matt Pyken & Thomas Westfall	March 31, 2020	6AXP15	2.58
100	16	"We Got Us"	Clement Virgo	Janeika James & Jasheika James	April 7, 2020	6AXP16	2.80
101	17	"Over Everything"	Stephen D'Amato	Jamie Rosengard & Cameron Johnson	April 14, 2020	6AXP17	2.69
102	18	"Home Is on the Way"	Geary McLeod; Bille Woodruff	Yolonda E. Lawrence & Michael C. Martin and Matt Pyken & Indira Gibson Wilson	April 21, 2020	6AXP18	2.94

== Ratings ==
Empire : U.S. viewers per episode (millions)

Season	Episode number																		Average
Season	1	2	3	4	5	6	7	8	9	10	11	12	13	14	15	16	17	18	Average
1	9.90	10.32	11.07	11.36	11.47	11.96	13.02	13.90	14.33	14.90	15.82	17.62	–						12.97
2	16.18	13.74	13.10	12.22	12.28	11.68	11.20	11.34	9.21	11.81	12.46	11.34	10.11	9.56	10.03	9.39	9.81	10.88	11.46
3	10.87	9.65	9.25	9.27	8.15	8.39	7.84	7.00	7.58	7.95	6.91	6.35	6.59	6.31	5.60	6.32	6.14	6.94	7.61
4	7.05	5.89	5.93	5.65	5.40	6.05	5.05	5.70	5.95	6.22	5.57	5.91	5.41	5.34	5.28	5.02	5.14	5.30	5.66
5	6.09	5.09	5.15	5.21	4.23	5.01	4.89	5.03	5.04	4.40	3.98	3.97	4.12	3.76	3.76	3.77	3.73	4.09	5.58
6	3.11	2.94	2.79	2.74	2.48	2.60	2.65	2.45	2.55	2.52	2.43	1.89	2.64	2.72	2.58	2.80	2.69	2.94	2.64

Audience measurement performed by Nielsen Media Research
