= Empire (2015 TV series) =

2015 American TV series

- Genre: Musical drama
- Created by: Lee Daniels; Danny Strong
- Starring: Terrence Howard; Taraji P. Henson; Bryshere Y. Gray; Jussie Smollett; Trai Byers; Grace Byers; Malik Yoba; Tasha Smith; Kaitlin Doubleday; Gabourey Sidibe; Ta'Rhonda Jones; Serayah; Morocco Omari; Alvin 'Xzibit' Joiner; Bre-Z; Rumer Willis; Terrell Carter; Andre Royo; Nicole Ari Parker; Chet Hanks; Rhyon Nicole Brown; A. Z. Kelsey; Vivica A. Fox; Meta Golding; Mario; Katlynn Simone; Wood Harris
- Composers: Fil Eisler (score); Rodney Jerkins, Ester Dean, Jim Beanz, et al (songs)
- Country of origin: United States
- Original language: English
- No. of seasons: 6
- No. of episodes: 102 (list of episodes)

Production
- Executive producers: Danny Strong; Brian Grazer; Robert Munic; Francie Calfo; Ilene Chaiken; Sanaa Hamri; Lee Daniels; Dennis Hammer; Brent Mahoney
- Producers: Attica Locke; Malcolm Spellman; Loucas George; Dianne Houston
- Production locations: Chicago, Illinois; New York City; Philadelphia, Pennsylvania
- Cinematography: Andrew Dunn; Paul M. Sommers
- Editors: Joe Leonard; Zack Arnold; Raúl Dávalos; Natalie A. Boschan; Matt Barber
- Running time: 42 minutes
- Production companies: Imagine Television; Lee Daniels Entertainment; Danny Strong Productions; Little Chicken Inc. (2015–2018) (seasons 1–4); 20th Century Fox Television

Original release
- Network: Fox
- Release: January 7, 2015 – April 21, 2020

Empire is an American musical drama television series created by Lee Daniels and Danny Strong that ran on Fox from January 7, 2015, to April 21, 2020. A joint production by Imagine Television and 20th Century Fox Television. Although it was filmed in Chicago, the show is set in New York. The series centers on the fictional hip hop music and entertainment company Empire Entertainment, and the drama among the members of the founders' family as they fight for control of it. It stars Terrence Howard, Taraji P. Henson, Bryshere Y. Gray, Jussie Smollett and Trai Byers as members of the Lyon Family, along with a supporting cast including Grace Byers, Kaitlin Doubleday, Gabourey Sidibe, Ta'Rhonda Jones, Serayah, and Vivica A. Fox.

The series premiere attracted nearly 10 million viewers while the first-season finale was watched by 17 million viewers. Its first season received positive reviews from critics, who praised its acting, particularly Henson's, its direction, soundtrack, writing, costumes, editing and the overall tone of the show, with many critics describing it as a "fresh take on a musical". Subsequent seasons also received positive reviews, with its second season being the most well received.

During its run, it was one of the most-watched television shows on Fox. On April 30, 2019, Fox renewed the show for the sixth and final season, which would be the first & only season without Smollett, who was confirmed to not be returning after he was charged with filing a false police report in an incident in which he staged an assault and hate crime. The season debuted on September 24, 2019, and the series concluded on April 21, 2020.

A spin-off of the series, centered around Taraji P. Henson's character, Cookie Lyon, was set to launch in 2020. However, Fox passed on the pilot, and it was reportedly shopped to other networks.

== Premise ==
Lucious Lyon (Terrence Howard) is a hip hop mogul, former drug dealer, and CEO of Empire Entertainment. Informed of his own imminent early death from ALS, Lucious is forced to choose, from amongst his progeny, a successor who will control his dynasty after his death. He begins working to groom one of his three sons to take over the family business – Empire CFO Andre (Trai Byers), R&B singer-songwriter Jamal (Jussie Smollett), and rapper Hakeem (Bryshere Y. Gray). In the process, Lucious pits them against each other. Lucious' ex-wife Cookie Lyon (Taraji P. Henson) is released from prison after serving a 17-year sentence, and also fights for control of both the company and of her sons.

== Cast and characters ==
- Terrence Howard as Lucious Lyon, né Dwight Walker

A former drug dealer turned hip-hop mogul and the founder and long-time CEO of Empire Entertainment, his life begins to cave in around him after his past sins come back to haunt him when he is diagnosed with amyotrophic lateral sclerosis. Besides Cookie, Lucious' other lovers are Anika (seasons 1 & 3), Giulana (season 4) and Yana (season 6).

- Taraji P. Henson as Loretha "Cookie" Lyon, née Holloway

Lucious' outspoken wife and mother of their three sons. She serves a 17-year prison sentence for drug dealing and sees herself as the sacrificial lamb for Empire Entertainment, which she built with Lucious, but then took the fall for him while running the very drugs that financed Lucious' early career. Upon her return from prison, she is determined to bring the Lyon family back together and reclaim her share of Empire Entertainment. In the second season, Cookie leaves the Empire group and starts her own record label, Lyon Dynasty. After allowing Empire Entertainment to acquire Lyon Dynasty, she returns to Empire as co-CEO and Head of A&R.

- Bryshere Y. Gray as Hakeem Lyon

Lucious' fame-obsessed youngest son and his favorite child, who is a hip-hop star on the rise. Initially combative towards his mother Cookie, Hakeem starts to become friendlier towards her, and has a great relationship with his older brother Jamal. He has had romantic relationships with Tiana, Camilla, Anika, Valentina, Laura and Maya (the former & latter who become his wives in the fourth & sixth season).

- Jussie Smollett as Jamal Lyon (seasons 1–5)

The middle son of the Lyon family, he is a talented gay singer-songwriter who despises the corporate aspect of the music industry. Jamal is estranged from his father, who considers him the black sheep of the family. Jamal is Cookie's favorite and has a strong relationship with his brother Hakeem. Lucious appoints Jamal as his successor at the end of the first season, and later as interim CEO when Lucious is arrested. Jamal later relinquishes control of Empire back to Lucious. After being accidentally shot by Freda Gatz in Season 2, Jamal begins to present symptoms of PTSD and a reliance on painkillers. His addiction ultimately leads to a visit to rehab. Smollett's character was removed from the last two episodes of the fifth season after Smollett was indicted on charges of staging an assault against himself. Smollett's character does not return for the sixth and final season, but he is mentioned with him and his new husband Kai moving to London and adopting a baby boy. Despite not appearing in the sixth season, nor being credited, the option in Smollett's contract for the sixth season was picked up.

- Trai Byers as Andre Lyon

The eldest son of the Lyon family and CFO of Empire Entertainment. He is Wharton educated, power hungry, and has bipolar disorder. He is married to his college sweetheart, Rhonda. He plans to run Empire, but is in a battle for the head chair with his younger brothers. In the second season, Andre initially helps Cookie and Hakeem set up Lyon Dynasty, but returns to Empire. Lucious later promotes Andre to President of Gutter Life Records, a sub-division of Empire Entertainment consisting of mainly urban rappers, such as Freda Gatz. In Season 3, 4 & 5, he loses his wife and becomes involved with Nessa, Charlotte, Pamela and Teri (the latter who becomes his new wife in the season 5 finale).

- Grace Byers as Anika Calhoun (seasons 1–4)

Initially the ambitious head of Empire Entertainment's A&R department, she becomes engaged to Lucious though they will eventually separate. After leaving Empire, Anika has sex with Hakeem and becomes pregnant. Fearful of Rhonda's pregnancy, as Rhonda's unborn child has claim to being the heir of Empire, Anika pushes Rhonda down a set of stairs, leading to the death of Rhonda's unborn child. Cookie and Anika share an extreme dislike for one another, with Cookie referring to Anika by the derisive nickname "Boo Boo Kitty". She gives birth to her and Hakeem's daughter Bella. Andre later drugs Anika's drink and she starts to have hallucinations of Rhonda down the stairs to her death. She then falls over the balcony, plummets, and lands on a glass champagne table, and dies in the season 4 finale.

- Malik Yoba as Vernon Turner (season 1; dead guest in Season 2)

Lucious's longtime friend and business partner, and chairman of Empire Entertainment. In the season one finale, Vernon is struck and killed by Rhonda when he attacks Andre, and both end up hiding the body.

- Kaitlin Doubleday as Rhonda Lyon (seasons 1–2; recurring in season 3; guest in season 4)

Andre's wife is a "ride-or-die chick" who is extremely fierce and loyal, and sticks by Andre's side as he tries to gain control of Empire. In the first-season finale she finds out that she is pregnant, but Anika pushes her down the stairs in the second season fall finale, and the baby dies in the second-season spring premiere. After her recovery, Rhonda begins to work for Empire's fashion label, "Antony and Cleopatra", initially run by Camilla Marks-Whiteman. After Camilla's suicide, Rhonda is appointed Creative Director of Antony and Cleopatra. In the third-season premiere, she attacks Anika due to finding out Anika had pushed her down the stairs earlier in the season, causing her to lose her unborn son. As a result, she falls off the building she and Anika were fighting on, lands on a car, and dies. She makes numerous appearances to Andre as a ghost during his hallucinations in the third season.

- Gabourey Sidibe as Rebecca "Becky" Williams (season 2–6; recurring in season 1)

Executive assistant to Lucious at Empire Entertainment. After Jamal's promotion to Vice Chairman, Jamal promotes Becky to A&R at Empire and its sub-label, Gutter Life Records. In season 4, she had taken Anika's position as Head of A&R at Cookie's request.

- Ta'Rhonda Jones as Porsha Taylor (season 2–6; recurring in season 1)

Cookie's executive assistant. She is extremely loyal to Cookie and the Lyon family having rejected Anika's offer to spy on her. She is shown to have some music skills and performed alongside Tiana at BossyFest.

- Serayah as Tiana Brown (seasons 2–6; recurring in season 1)

An artist at Empire Entertainment who becomes Hakeem's girlfriend for some time. Following an off-and-on again relationship, Tiana and Hakeem get married, and Tiana becomes pregnant with twins, although only one child survives. Tiana's lovers were Gram, Blake, Carlito, Devon and most significantly, Hakeem Lyon (her ex-husband).

- Bre-Z as Freda Gathers/"Freda Gatz" (guest in season 6; season 3; recurring in season 2)

A female rapper, who becomes a surrogate daughter to Lucious after the murder of her father, Frank Gathers. Lucious later sets up Freda to become Hakeem's rival.

- Morocco Omari as Tariq Cousins (season 3; recurring in season 2)

An FBI Agent, who is also Lucious' half-brother.

- Alvin 'Xzibit' Joiner as Leslie "Shyne" Johnson (season 3–4; guest in season 2 & 5)

A former rival of Lucious Lyon that soon becomes a close ally, described as "100 percent wolf and 100 percent gangsta".

- Andre Royo as Thurston "Thirsty" Rawlings, (seasons 4–5; seasons 2−3 recurring)

Lucious' lawyer/confidant/right-hand man.

- Rumer Willis as Tory Ash, (season 4; season 3 guest)

A singer who fell off as an addict then becomes close friends with Jamal. She later betrays him to work with Lucious.

- Terrell Carter as Warren Hall, (season 4)

An attorney, Diana Dubois' nephew, Angelo's cousin and Jamal's ex.

- Nicole Ari Parker as Giselle Sims-Barker, (season 5–6; season 4 recurring)

Eddie Barker's trophy ex-wife.

- Chet Hanks as Blake Sterling, (season 5; season 4 recurring)

A rapper and Hakeem's friend.

- Rhyon Nicole Brown as Maya Landry-Lyon (seasons 5–6; season 4 recurring)

The daughter of Cookie's fellow inmate Poundcake and Hakeem Lyon's current wife. She and Tiana share an extreme dislike towards one another with the former being jealous of Tiana's success and the latter feeling bitter about Maya's relationship with Hakeem.

- A.Z. Kelsey as Jeff Kingsley (seasons 5–6)

Hotshot, Silicon Valley genius turned interim leader of Empire Entertainment. He is Ivy League educated with an edge and is Lucious' illegitimate son. In the season five finale, Jeff commits suicide in front of Lucious, and his heart is given to Andre for a heart transplant.

- Vivica A. Fox as Candace Holloway-Mason (season 6; seasons 2–5 recurring)

Cookie's well-behaved but snobby and judgmental older sister. She is a realtor.

- Mario as Devon (season 6; season 5 recurring): Lucious' new artist and Tiana's new love interest.
- Meta Golding as Teri Brooks-Lyon (season 6; season 5 recurring)

Andre's second wife and Quincy's mother.

- Katlynn Simone as Treasure (season 6; season 5 recurring)

Formerly a prison social worker, but now an artist at Empire and Tiana's main rival.

- Wood Harris as Damon Cross (season 6; season 5 recurring)

Lucious' rival and Cookie's new love interest.

== Episodes ==
Season	Episodes	Originally released		Rank	Viewers (millions)
Season	Episodes	First released	Last released	Rank	Viewers (millions)
1	12	January 7, 2015	March 18, 2015	5	17.33
2	18	September 23, 2015	May 18, 2016	5	15.94
3	18	September 21, 2016	May 24, 2017	23	10.37
4	18	September 27, 2017	May 23, 2018	52	7.45
5	18	September 26, 2018	May 8, 2019	68	6.38
6	18	September 24, 2019	April 21, 2020	80	4.04

== Production ==
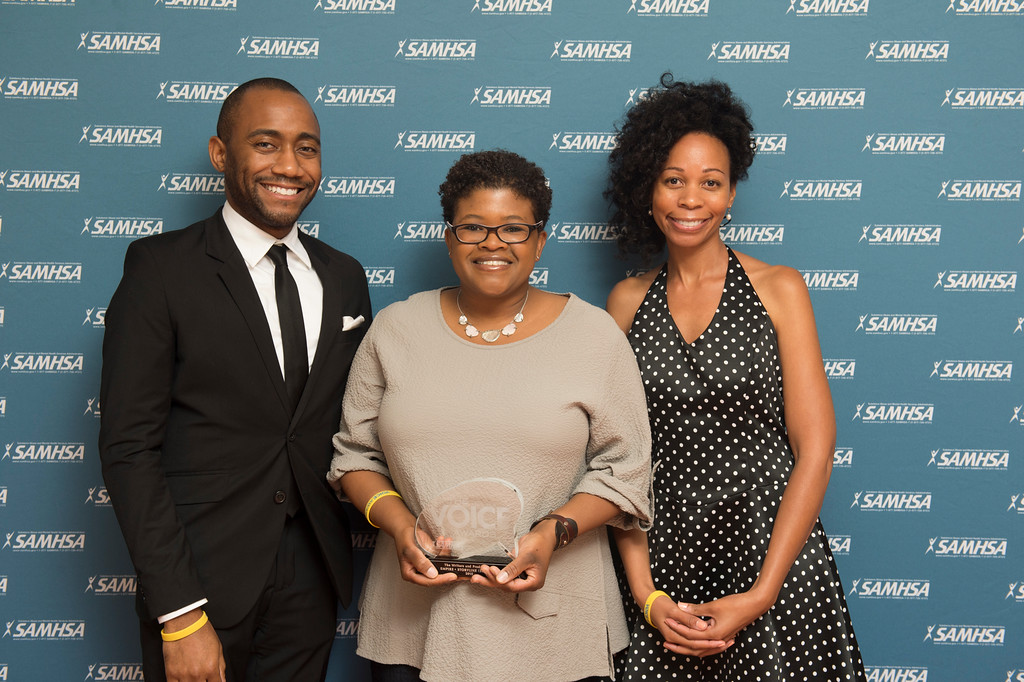
Joshua Allen and Attica Locke, writers and producers of the show Empire, stand with their 2015 Voice Award. They are joined by Sonay Washington Hoffman from Writers Guild of America, West.

Howard, Henson and Sidibe filmed the pilot episode in Chicago (Cinespace Chicago Film Studios) in March 2014. On May 6, 2014, Fox picked up Empire as a series order for its 2014–15 television schedule. On May 12, 2014, Fox announced that Empire would air as a midseason replacement, rather than as a part of the fall schedule. On November 19, 2014, it was confirmed that the pilot episode would premiere on January 7, 2015, following the season 14 premiere of American Idol.

The executive producers are Brian Grazer, Danny Strong and Francie Calfo. The show is written by Strong while Lee Daniels, who has been nominated for the Academy Award for Best Director, made his television directorial debut with the show. According to Strong, the show is based in part on William Shakespeare's King Lear, and James Goldman's The Lion in Winter; Daniels also acknowledged a strong influence from the ABC prime-time soap opera Dynasty. Ilene Chaiken later joined the series as showrunner. On January 17, 2015, the series was renewed for an 18-episode second season, which premiered on September 23, 2015.

The fourth season, consisting of eighteen episodes premiered on September 27, 2017, and crossed over with another Fox series co-created by Daniels, Star.

On May 2, 2018, Fox renewed the series for a fifth season with Brett Mahoney taking over as showrunner from Ilene Chaiken. The season premiered on September 26, 2018.

On April 15, 2019, The Hollywood Reporter reported that a judge was allowing 300 jailed youth to sue Fox for using their prison facility to film Empire.

In March 2020, production of the final season was shut down due to the COVID-19 pandemic, preventing the last episodes' filming.

=== Casting ===
Howard was cast in the lead on February 19, 2014. Henson was named as the female lead on February 26, and Jussie Smollett was announced in a starring role. Howard and Henson previously starred together as love interests in the film Hustle & Flow, and starred in the 2005 film Four Brothers. On March 10, 2014, Sidibe, who had previously worked with Daniels in Precious, was cast in a recurring role as Becky, Lucious' assistant. Trai Byers and Grace Gealey were announced in regular roles, while Bryshere Y. Gray and Malik Yoba were announced in starring roles. Courtney Love was added to the cast on October 23, 2014. Naomi Campbell was announced in a recurring role on September 29, 2014.

On June 2, 2015, it was announced Adam Rodriguez would join the cast in a recurring role in the second season of Empire, portraying Laz Delgado, a potential love interest for Cookie.

In 2016, Phylicia Rashad was cast as a recurring guest star in the role of Diana DuBois in the third season of Empire.

In February 2017, Rumer Willis joined the third season of Empire in a recurring role.

==== Jussie Smollett removal ====
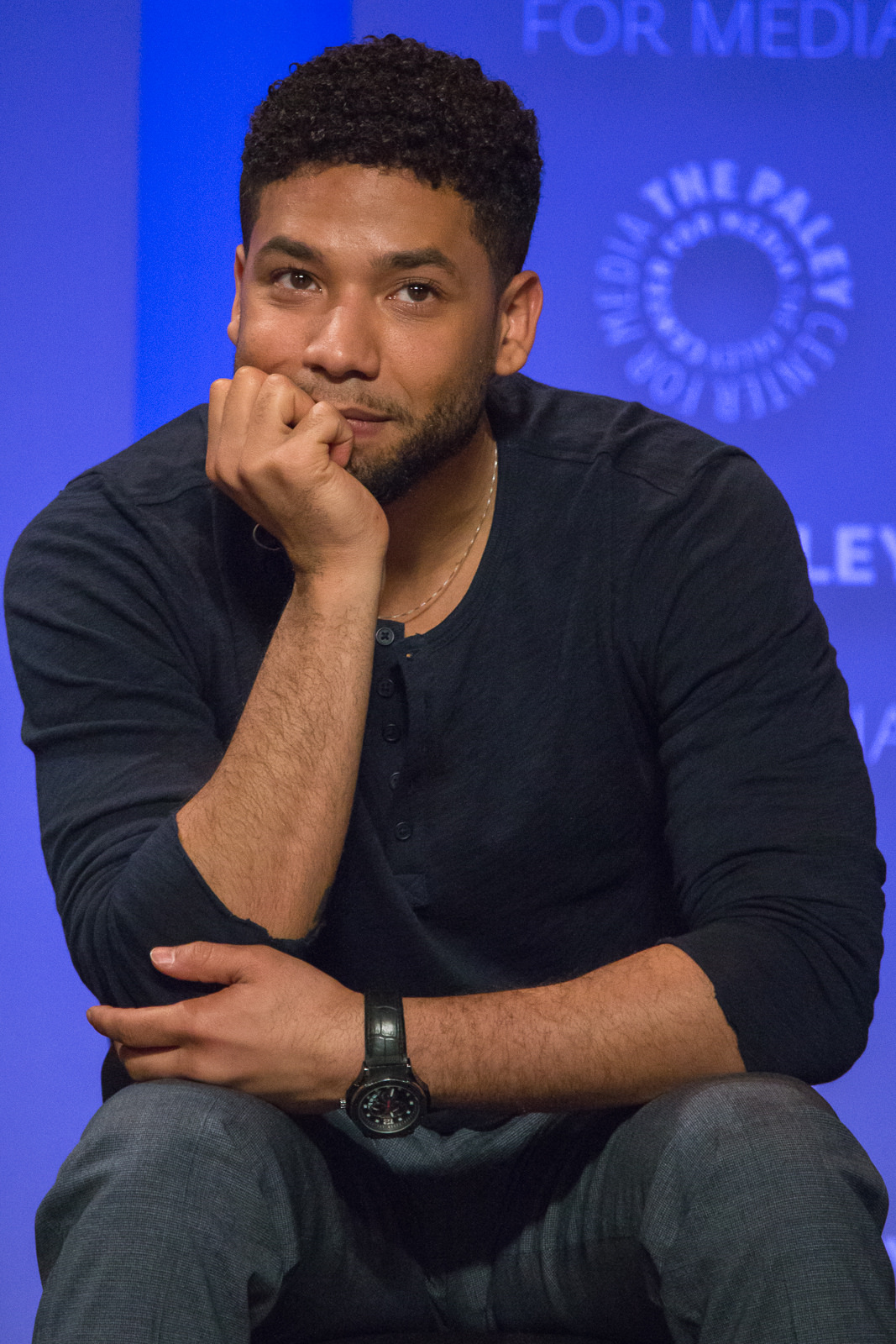
Smollett in 2016

On January 22, 2019, Jussie Smollett filed a police report about a threatening letter sent to Fox Studios, where Empire is filmed. According to Smollett, the letter contained "threatening language" and a powdery substance believed to be crushed-up Tylenol. On January 29, 2019, Smollett reported that he was attacked by two men who shouted "homophobic and racial slurs" at him and then threw an "unknown chemical substance" on him. Smollett told police that they wrapped a rope around his neck and yelled "MAGA country", which references President Donald Trump's "Make America Great Again" (MAGA) slogan. Smollett was then hospitalized.

On February 13, Chicago police arrested two "persons of interest". However, on February 14, 2019, it was revealed that police were investigating whether Smollett and the two men staged the attack because Smollett believed he was being written off Empire. Interrogations revealed that both men, the Osundairo brothers, were allegedly paid off by Smollett to stage the attack. On February 20, 2019, Smollett was indicted for filing a false police report. He faces a maximum of three years in prison.

Subsequently, Smollett was removed from the last two episodes of the fifth season. In a written statement, the show's producers said that "While these allegations are very disturbing, we are placing our trust in the legal system as the process plays... We are also aware of the effects of this process on the cast and crew members who work on our show and to avoid further disruption on set, we have decided to remove the role of 'Jamal' from the final two episodes of the season."

On March 26, it was announced that the charges against Smollett had been dropped, although he remains under federal investigation regarding a hate letter that is believed to have been written by Smollett himself. The fate of Smollett's character 'Jamal' currently remains unclear.

On April 30, 2019, it was announced that, although Fox Entertainment had extended Smollett's contract for season six of Empire, there were no plans for the character to appear during the season.

On June 4, 2019, series co-creator Lee Daniels officially announced that Smollett would not be returning for the sixth and final season.

On December 9, 2021, Smollett was convicted on five of six counts brought against him by Special Prosecutor Dan Webb in the hoax case and is awaiting sentencing, where he faces up to three years in county jail for his fabricated police reports.

On November 21, 2024, the Supreme Court of Illinois overturned Smollett's convictions, ruling that his second presecution violated due process because the original charges had been dismissed under an agreement with prosecutors. The ruling did not address whether the reported attack had been staged.

=== Accusations of plagiarism ===
Clayton Prince, a Philadelphia native and actor who gained early notoriety for starring as Jericho "Gibs" Gibson in the CBS crime drama television series Dark Justice, sued Daniels over accusations of copyright infringement in 2016. Prince alleged that Daniels stole the idea for Empire after having pitched it to him at a Greater Philadelphia Film Office event in 2008. Cream, Prince's musical drama television show, revolved around an African-American record label executive who, after being diagnosed with a fatal disease, must hastily choose a successor to run his record label upon his death. US District Judge Joel Slomsky dismissed the case in April 2017, stating that the plots of both shows were dissimilar enough to rule out any possible copyright infringement. In his words, "...both Mozart and Metallica composed in E minor." Prince went on to make Cream as a four part miniseries in 2017.

=== Music ===
After finding his lead actors, Lee Daniels set out to find a producer to craft the music for the series. Because he felt his own musical tastes and desires would be a little too dated for the show, Daniels consulted with people he thought could give him a little more insight, his children. At the urging of his son and daughter, Daniels contacted super producer Timothy "Timbaland" Mosley, known for scoring hits with some of pop and R&B's biggest artists including Missy Elliott, Madonna, Brandy, Destiny's Child, Justin Timberlake, Jay-Z, Nelly Furtado, Ginuwine, and Aaliyah.

As executive music Producer, Timbaland, co-songwriter/producer Jim Beanz, and a team of other musical collaborators took their cues from the writing team, which gave them an idea of where the plot is headed, and craft songs to fit those themes. However, the musical aspect of the series is very reality-based, unlike Fox's last musical series, Glee, performances come with the organic development of the characters as artists, much like the performances featured in the ABC prime-time country musical drama Nashville.

Any licensed songs and composer Fil Eisler's score are added after the episodes are filmed. The pilot itself consists of 12 songs. Columbia Records releases weekly soundtracks of Empire on the iTunes Store, the same strategy used with Glee. In May 2015, Fox announced that Ne-Yo and J.R. Rotem would write music for the show's second season, joining Timbaland. Timbaland left Empire after season 2, and were replaced for season 3 by Rodney "Darkchild" Jerkins and Esther Dean.

On September 8, 2015, Scott Hoying and Mitch Grassi from Pentatonix arranged a medley of songs from the first season of Empire and posted it on their shared YouTube comedy/music channel, Superfruit. The video was sponsored by the Fox Broadcasting Company.

==== Soundtracks ====
Columbia Records released the official soundtrack of Empire's first season on March 10, 2015. The soundtrack consists of 11 songs and the deluxe version consists of 18 songs, all performed on the show. As of October 2015, the album has sold 439,000 total copies in the United States. Additional releases have followed for subsequent seasons.

For season 6, four songs from the premiere episode were released in advance of the season, and two new songs will be released each week ahead of each new episode.

Soundtrack	Release date	Format(s)	Label	Edition(s)	Ref.
Season 1	March 10, 2015	CD; Digital download	Columbia	Standard; Deluxe	
Season 1	September 11, 2015	Digital download	Columbia	The Complete Season 1	
Season 2 (Vol. 1)	November 20, 2015	CD; Digital download	Columbia	Standard; Deluxe	
Season 2 (Vol. 2)	April 29, 2016	CD; Digital download	Columbia	Standard; Deluxe	
Season 2	July 8, 2016	Digital download	Columbia	The Complete Season 2	
Season 3	April 28, 2017	CD; Digital download	Columbia	Standard	

== Broadcast ==
Empire was set to premiere in Australia on February 19, 2015, on Network Ten; however, a week out from this date it was dumped from the schedule and pushed back. It ultimately premiered on March 1, 2015, to a disappointing 377,000 total viewers, although it fared better with viewers in younger demographics. The second season was broadcast on Eleven from September 29, 2015.

In Canada, the series was simulcast on Omni Television (Omni 2). The fourth episode and the season finale would also air on City, a sibling broadcast network. Sibling cable network FX Canada would also air a marathon of the show on March 14 and 15, 2015. The show moved to City starting in the 2015–16 season, but was dropped from their lineup after the first half of the second season due to low ratings; Fox affiliates are widely available on pay television as well as over-the-air in some areas. Shomi, a subscription streaming service co-owned by City's parent company Rogers Communications, began to add new episodes following their U.S. premiere on Fox. A representative of the service stated that Empire was among its ten most popular programs.

Empire started broadcasting in the United Kingdom on E4 with the first episode airing on April 28, 2015. 5Star have since taken over the rights as of Season 4.

The series premiered in India on STAR World Premiere HD on April 24, 2015 (only in high-definition). Later, on July 14, 2015, Empire also premiered on FX India (both in standard and high definition) with the Season 1 finale airing on July 29, 2015. Empire premiered on June 24, 2015, in Germany on Pro Sieben, with the Pilot reaching 930,000 viewers. In Finland, the show premiered on Sub on December 2, 2015. In South Africa, the show premiered on e.tv on February 3, 2016. In Serbia, the series premiered on Fox, on January 23, 2016. In the United States, TV One has the exclusive cable rerun rights.

== Reception ==
In 2016, a study by The New York Times of the 50 TV shows with the most Facebook Likes found that Empire "is most popular in the Black Belt and in parts of the country with a high percentage of Native Americans".

=== Ratings ===
Viewership and ratings per season of Empire
Season	Timeslot (ET)	Episodes	First aired		Last aired		TV season	Viewership rank	Avg. viewers (millions)	Avg. 18–49 rating
Season	Timeslot (ET)	Episodes	Date	Viewers (millions)	Date	Viewers (millions)	TV season	Viewership rank	Avg. viewers (millions)	Avg. 18–49 rating
1	Wednesday 9:00 pm	12	January 7, 2015	9.90	March 18, 2015	17.62	2014–15	5	17.33	7.1
2	Wednesday 9:00 pm	18	September 23, 2015	16.18	May 18, 2016	10.88	2015–16	5	15.73	6.4
3	Wednesday 9:00 pm	18	September 21, 2016	10.87	May 24, 2017	6.94	2016–17	23	10.37	3.9
4	Wednesday 8:00 pm	18	September 27, 2017	7.05	May 23, 2018	5.30	2017–18	52	7.45	2.6
5	Wednesday 8:00 pm	18	September 26, 2018	6.09	May 8, 2019	4.09	2018–19	68	6.38	2.0
6	Tuesday 9:00 pm	18	September 24, 2019	3.31	April 21, 2020	2.94	2019–20	80	4.04	1.2

- Note: The eleventh episode of the first season aired outside of its regular timeslot at Wednesday 8 pm.

=== Critical response ===
Critical response of Empire
Season	Rotten Tomatoes	Metacritic
1	84% (49 reviews)	69 (39 reviews)
2	87% (35 reviews)	77 (22 reviews)
3	87% (32 reviews)	—N/a
4	83% (6 reviews)	—N/a
5	83% (6 reviews)	—N/a

Empire has received positive reviews, with praise for the cast, particularly Howard and Henson. On Rotten Tomatoes, the first season has a rating of 84%, based on 49 reviews, with an average rating of 7.24/10. The site's critical consensus reads, "Though heavy on melodrama, Empire elevates the nighttime soap with its top-notch cast, musical entertainment, and engrossing plots." On Metacritic the show has a score of 72 out of 100, based on 39 critics, indicating "generally favorable reviews". For the second season, the score rose a few points higher, further praising the performances of Henson and Howard, the character development, plot development, and the show's self-awareness for being a soap opera. On Rotten Tomatoes, the second season has an 87% with an average rating of 7.54/10 from critics and a score of 77 from Metacritic.

David Wiegand wrote in the San Francisco Chronicle: "Almost nothing about Empire, created by Lee Daniels (The Butler), feels original, but after a few minutes, you will stop caring". 50 Cent stated via Twitter that he feels that Empire is being marketed by FOX in a way that resembles the marketing for the 2014 Starz series that he produces called Power. Michael Logan of TV Guide described Empire as a "sudsy retooling of King Lear with hip hop as the backdrop" and praised Henson for her portrayal of the character Cookie.

The show's premiere ranked as Fox's highest-rated debut in three years. Empire was the first primetime broadcast series in at least 23 years to have its viewership increase week to week for its first five episodes. The show continued to increase its viewership with further episodes. Episodes of the show have also been heavily watched on Video on Demand and other streaming services. Empire surpassed The Big Bang Theory as the highest rated scripted program in the 2014–2015 television season. The first-season finale was also the highest rated debut season finale since May 2005, when Grey's Anatomy ended its first season. Empire's season one finale grew 82 percent from its series premiere, making it the show that has grown the most over the course of its first season since Men in Trees during the 2006–2007 season.

== Awards and nominations ==
Year	Award	Category	Nominee(s)	Result	Ref.
2015	American Film Institute	Top 10 TV Shows	Empire	Won	
2015	BET Award	Best Actor	Terrence Howard	Won	
2015	BET Award	Best Actor	Jussie Smollett	Nominated	
2015	BET Award	Best Actress	Taraji P. Henson	Won	
2015	Critics' Choice Television Award	Best Drama Series	Empire	Nominated	
2015	Critics' Choice Television Award	Best Actress in a Drama Series	Taraji P. Henson	Won	
2015	Critics' Choice Television Award	Most Bingeworthy Show	Empire	Nominated	
2015	People's Choice Award	Favorite Network TV Drama	Empire	Nominated	
2015	People's Choice Award	Favorite Dramatic TV Actor	Terrence Howard	Nominated	
2015	People's Choice Award	Favorite Dramatic TV Actress	Taraji P. Henson	Nominated	
2015	Primetime Emmy Award	Outstanding Lead Actress in a Drama Series	Taraji P. Henson	Nominated	
2015	Primetime Emmy Award	Outstanding Costumes for a Contemporary Series, Limited Series or Movie	Eileen McCahill and Paolo Nieddu ("Pilot")	Nominated	
2015	Primetime Emmy Award	Outstanding Costumes for a Contemporary Series, Limited Series or Movie	Rita McGhee and Sukari McGill ("The Lyon's Roar")	Nominated	
2015	Teen Choice Award	Choice TV Show: Drama	Empire	Won	
2015	Teen Choice Award	Choice TV Actor: Drama	Terrence Howard	Nominated	
2015	Teen Choice Award	Choice TV Actor: Drama	Jussie Smollett	Nominated	
2015	Teen Choice Award	Choice TV Actress: Drama	Taraji P. Henson	Nominated	
2015	Teen Choice Award	Choice TV: Breakout Show	Empire	Won	
2015	Teen Choice Award	Choice TV: Breakout Star	Bryshere Y. Gray	Nominated	
2015	Teen Choice Award	Choice TV: Breakout Star	Jussie Smollett	Nominated	
2015	Teen Choice Award	Choice TV: Scene Stealer	Trai Byers	Nominated	
2015	Teen Choice Award	Choice TV: Villain	Terrence Howard	Nominated	
2015	Teen Choice Award	Choice TV: Chemistry	Trai Byers, Bryshere Y. Gray, Taraji P. Henson, Terrence Howard & Jussie Smollett	Nominated	
2015	Teen Choice Award	Choice Music: Song from a Movie or TV Show	"You're So Beautiful" – Empire Cast feat. Jussie Smollett & Bryshere Y. Gray	Nominated	
2015	Television Critics Association Award	Program of the Year	Empire	Won	
2015	Television Critics Association Award	Outstanding Achievement in Drama	Empire	Nominated	
2015	Television Critics Association Award	Outstanding New Program	Empire	Nominated	
2015	Television Critics Association Award	Individual Achievement in Drama	Taraji P. Henson	Nominated	
2015	Hollywood Music in Media Awards	Original Score – TV Show / Digital Series	Empire	Nominated	
2015	Hollywood Music in Media Awards	Song – TV Show/Digital Series	"Good Enough"	Nominated	
2015	Hollywood Music in Media Awards	Outstanding Music Supervision – Television	"Empire"	Won	
2015	Hollywood Music in Media Awards	Soundtrack Album	"Empire Original Soundtrack From Season 1"	Nominated	
2016	Grammy Award	Best Compilation Soundtrack for Visual Media	Empire: Original Soundtrack from Season 1	Nominated	
2016	Golden Globe Awards	Best Television Series – Drama	Empire	Nominated	
2016	Golden Globe Awards	Best Actress – Television Series Drama	Taraji P. Henson	Won	
2016	NAACP Image Awards	Outstanding Drama Series	Empire	Won	
2016	NAACP Image Awards	Outstanding Actor in a Drama Series	Terrence Howard	Won	
2016	NAACP Image Awards	Outstanding Actress in a Drama Series	Taraji P. Henson	Won	
2016	NAACP Image Awards	Outstanding Album	Empire: Original Soundtrack from Season 1	Nominated	
2016	NAACP Image Awards	Outstanding Song – Contemporary	"Conqueror" Empire Cast	Nominated	
2016	NAACP Image Awards	Outstanding Duo, Group or Collaboration	"Conqueror" Empire Cast	Won	
2016	Critics Choice Television Award	Best Drama Series	Empire	Nominated	
2016	Critics Choice Television Award	Best Actress in a Drama Series	Taraji P. Henson	Nominated	
2016	Critics Choice Television Award	Best Guest Performer in a Drama Series	Marisa Tomei	Nominated	
2016	Critics Choice Television Award	Most Bingeworthy Show	Empire	Nominated	
2016	Costume Designers Guild Awards	Outstanding Contemporary Television Series	Rita McGhee	Nominated	
2016	Teen Choice Award	Choice: TV Show	Empire	Nominated	
2016	Teen Choice Award	Choice: TV Drama Actor	Terrence Howard	Nominated	
2016	Teen Choice Award	Choice: TV Drama Actor	Jussie Smollet	Nominated	
2016	Teen Choice Award	Choice: TV Drama Actress	Taraji P. Henson	Nominated	
2016	Primetime Emmy Award	Outstanding Lead Actress in a Drama Series	Taraji P. Henson	Nominated	
2016	Primetime Emmy Award	Outstanding Costumes for a Contemporary Series, Limited Series, or Movie	("Past Is Prologue")	Nominated	
2016	Primetime Emmy Award	Outstanding Original Music and Lyrics	(Episode: "A Rose by Any Other Name") (Song: "Good People")	Nominated	
2017	Costume Designers Guild Awards	Outstanding Contemporary Television Series	Paolo Nieddu	Nominated	
2017	Make-Up Artists & Hair Stylists Guild	TV and New Media Series - Best Contemporary Make-Up	Beverly Jo Pryor, Eric Pagdin, Ashunta Sheriff	Nominated	
2017	Make-Up Artists & Hair Stylists Guild	TV and New Media Series - Best Contemporary Hair Styling	Melissa Forney, Teresa Fleming, Nolan Kelly	Nominated	
2017	Black Reel Awards for Television	Outstanding Actress, Drama Series	Taraji P. Henson	Nominated	
2017	Black Reel Awards for Television	Outstanding Actor, Drama Series	Terrence Howard	Nominated	
2017	Black Reel Awards for Television	Outstanding Supporting Actor, Drama Series	Trai Byers	Nominated	
2017	Black Reel Awards for Television	Outstanding Directing, Drama Series	Sanaa Hamri for "A Furnace For You"	Nominated	
2017	Black Reel Awards for Television	Outstanding Writing, Drama Series	Diane Ademu-John & Eric Haywood for "Toll & Trouble Pt. 1"	Nominated	
2017	Black Reel Awards for Television	Outstanding Guest Performer, Drama Series	Phylicia Rashad	Nominated	
2017	Black Reel Awards for Television	Outstanding Music (Comedy, Drama, TV Movie or Limited Series)	Fil Feisler (composer); Jennifer Ross (music supervisor)	Nominated	
2018	Teen Choice Awards	Choice Drama TV Show	Empire	Nominated	
2018	Teen Choice Awards	Choice Drama TV Actor	Jussie Smollett	Nominated	

== See also ==
- "The Great Phatsby" – a parody of the show on fellow Fox program The Simpsons.
