= Meta Golding =

Haitian-American actress (born 1971)

- Born: November 2, 1971 (age 54); New Delhi, Delhi, India
- Occupation: Actress
- Years active: 1995–present

Meta Golding is an actress.

== Life and career ==
Golding was born in India in 1971. Her parents were international aid workers and she was raised in several countries. Besides the United States, Golding also lived in India, Haiti, France and Italy. During her years in Italy, she competed on ice as a figure skater, but when an injury ended her skating career she started acting in theater. She returned to the US to attend Cornell University and earned degrees in Theatre Arts and International Relations.

Golding played District 2 tribute Enobaria in The Hunger Games: Catching Fire and The Hunger Games: Mockingjay – Part 2.

She also guest starred on Criminal Minds temporarily replacing A. J. Cook, and played villainous Selina in an episode of Burn Notice.

Golding is fluent in English, French, Haitian Creole and Italian.

== Filmography ==
Film
| Year | Title | Role | Notes |
|---|---|---|---|
| 1995 | Conversations | | Short film |
| 1995 | Quiet Days in Hollywood | Julie | |
| 1997 | Kiss the Girls | Beautiful Girl | |
| 1998 | Louis & Frank | Betsy | |
| 2001 | On Edge | Julie Johnson | |
| 2002 | BraceFace Brandi | Kim Davis | Short film |
| 2003 | Date or Disaster | Tarot Lady | |
| 2009 | Surrogates | Female Counsel | |
| 2011 | The Carrier | Brenda | Short film |
| 2011 | The Chicago 8 | Leslie Seale | |
| 2012 | Shadow Witness | Dina Saunders | |
| 2013 | The Hunger Games: Catching Fire | Enobaria | |
| 2015 | The Hunger Games: Mockingjay – Part 2 | Enobaria | |
| 2015 | The Fix | Abigail | |

Television
| Year | Title | Role | Notes |
|---|---|---|---|
| 1995 | Loving | Brianna Hawkins | 68 episodes |
| 1996 | The Wayans Bros. | Gina | Episode: "Drama for Yo' Mama" |
| 1996 | Malcolm & Eddie | Julia | Episode: "Little Sister"; Episode: "Do the K.C. Hustle" |
| 1998 | Soldier of Fortune, Inc. | Halle | Episode: "Hired Guns" |
| 2000 | Midnight Blue | Niki | TV movie |
| 2000 | V.I.P. | Meter Maid | Episode: "Val's on First" |
| 2001 | Ally McBeal | Sylvie Stiles | Episode: "The Obstacle Course" |
| 2001 | The District | Community Member | Episode: "The Agony and the Ecstasy"; Episode: "Don't Fence Me In" |
| 2001 | Crossing Jordan | Dr. Candace McIntyre | Episode: "Sight Unseen" |
| 2001, 2005, 2006, 2008, 2012 | CSI: Crime Scene Investigation | Rachel; Tina Brown/Brewster | Episode: "Fahrenheit 932"; 4 episodes |
| 2002 | The Division | Alison 'Sunny' Beers | Episode: "Unfamiliar Territory" |
| 2003 | The Lyon's Den | Attorney Sanders | Episode: "Duty to Save" |
| 2004 | Cold Case | Sadie Douglas | Episode: "The Letter" |
| 2005 | JAG | Lt. Tali Mayfield | 3 episodes |
| 2005 | Reunion | Ella | Episode: "1992" |
| 2006 | In Justice | Lucinda Bates | Episode: "Victims" |
| 2006–2007 | Day Break | Jennifer Mathis | 13 episodes |
| 2007 | House | Robin | Episode: "Airborne" |
| 2008 | Eli Stone | Carly Tuck | Episode: "Something to Save"; Episode: "Praying for Time" |
| 2008–2009 | Criminal Minds | Agent Jordan Todd | 8 episodes |
| 2009 | Lie to Me | Raven | Episode: "Honey" |
| 2009–2010 | Dark Blue | Melissa Curtis | 10 episodes |
| 2010 | Iris Expanding | Fox News Barbie (uncredited) | TV movie |
| 2010 | Miami Medical | Dr. Anne Reed | Episode: "Like a Hurricane" |
| 2010 | Burn Notice | Selina | Episode: "Entry Point" |
| 2010 | NCIS: Los Angeles | LAPD Detective Jess Traynor | Episode: "Human Traffic" |
| 2010 | CSI: Miami | Dr. Victoria Mercier | Episode: "Sudden Death" |
| 2011 | Body of Proof | Nancy Follett | Episode: "Dead Man Walking" |
| 2013 | The Tomorrow People | Agent Darcy Nichols | Recurring Character (season 1) |
| 2017 | Colony | Noa | 3 episodes |
| 2018–2019 | Empire | Teri | 4 episodes |
| 2023 | Rabbit Hole | Hailey Winton | Main role |
| 2025 | Ransom Canyon | Paula Jo | 4 episodes |
| 2026 | The Pitt | Nurse Noelle Hastings | 4 episodes |
