= Ta'Rhonda Jones =

American actress

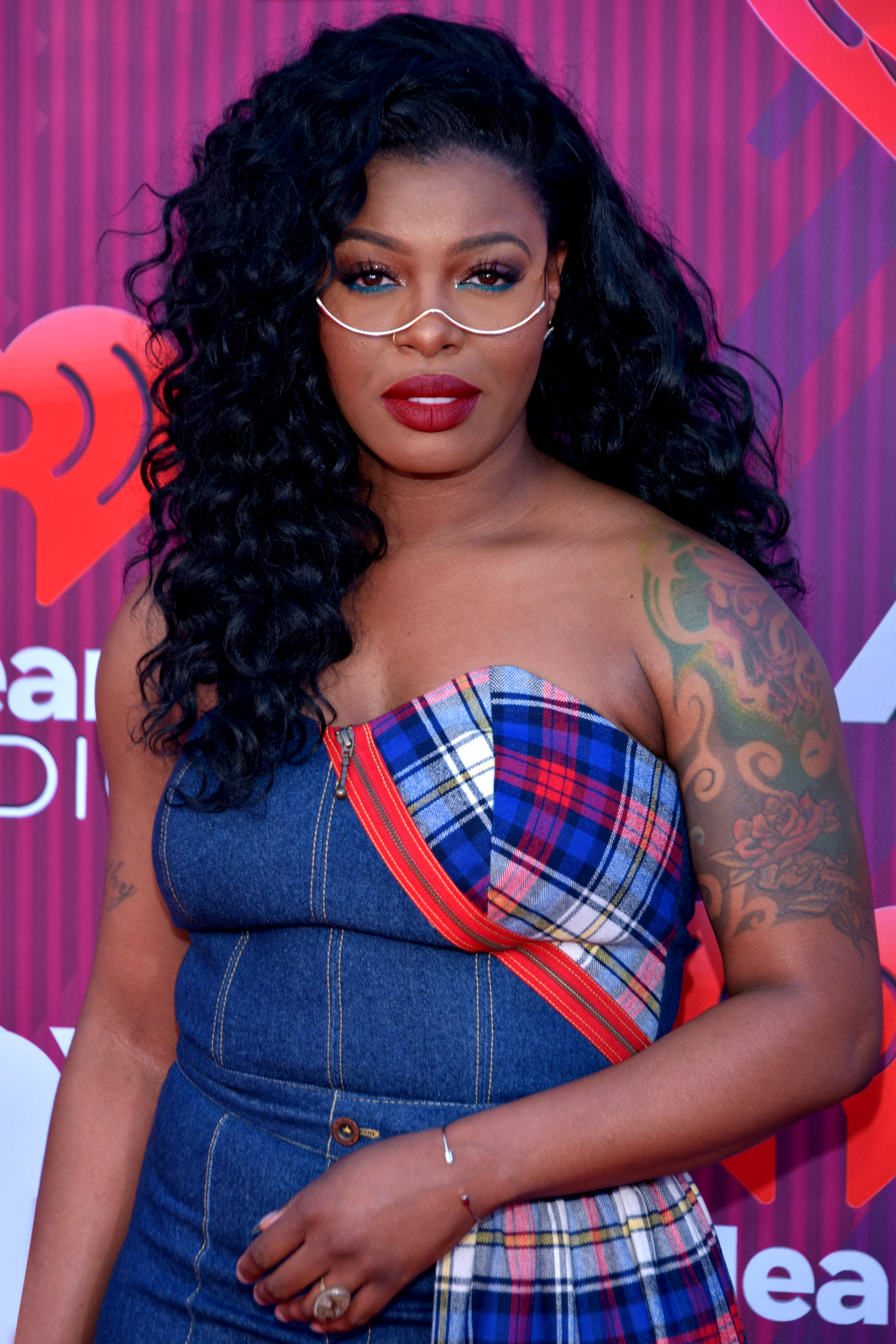
- Ta'Rhonda Jones at the 2019 iHeartRadio Music Awards in Los Angeles California
- Born: July 12, 1988 (age 38)
- Other name: Lady Heroine
- Occupations: Actress; rapper

Ta'Rhonda Jones (born July 12, 1988) is an American actress and rapper who is best known for her recurring role as Porsha Taylor on the FOX television series Empire and was promoted to the main cast for the second season. Jones portrays Taraji P. Henson's assistant on the drama.

== Career ==
Jones originally tried out for the role of Tiana Brown, portrayed by Serayah McNeill. Before getting the role on Empire, she worked at a nursing home in South Side Chicago. She also had a role in an episode of Chicago P.D. entitled "Get Back to Even" in 2015.

In 2016, she played the role of Sister in the short film The Tale of Four directed by Gabourey Sidibe.

In 2017, Jones played the role of Meg in the Hallmark movie The Perfect Christmas Present.

In 2020, Jones played the role of Shanara Mobley in the Lifetime movie, "Stolen By My Mother: The Kamiyah Mobley Story."

== Filmography ==
=== Television ===
Year	Title	Role	Notes
2015–2020	Empire	Porsha Taylor	Recurring (season 1); Main cast (season 2–6)
2015	Chicago P.D.	Sherri Gifford	Season 2 Episode 18
2016	MasterChef Celebrity Showdown	Contestant	Winner
2017	Face Value	Herself	Game Show
2017	The Perfect Christmas Present	Meg	TV movie
2020	Stolen by My Mother: The Kamiyah Mobley Story	Shanara Mobley	TV movie
2022	Line Sisters	Simona	TV movie
2024-25	The Never Ever Mets	Host	

=== Film ===
Year	Title	Role	Notes
2016	The Tale of Four	Sister	Short Film
2017	Surprise Me!	Lady	
2019	Captive State	Barbosa	
2019	Angrily Ever After	Jillian James	
2019	Hip Hop Holiday	Leesa Jay	
