= Moses =

Prophet in Abrahamic religions

- מֹשֶׁה
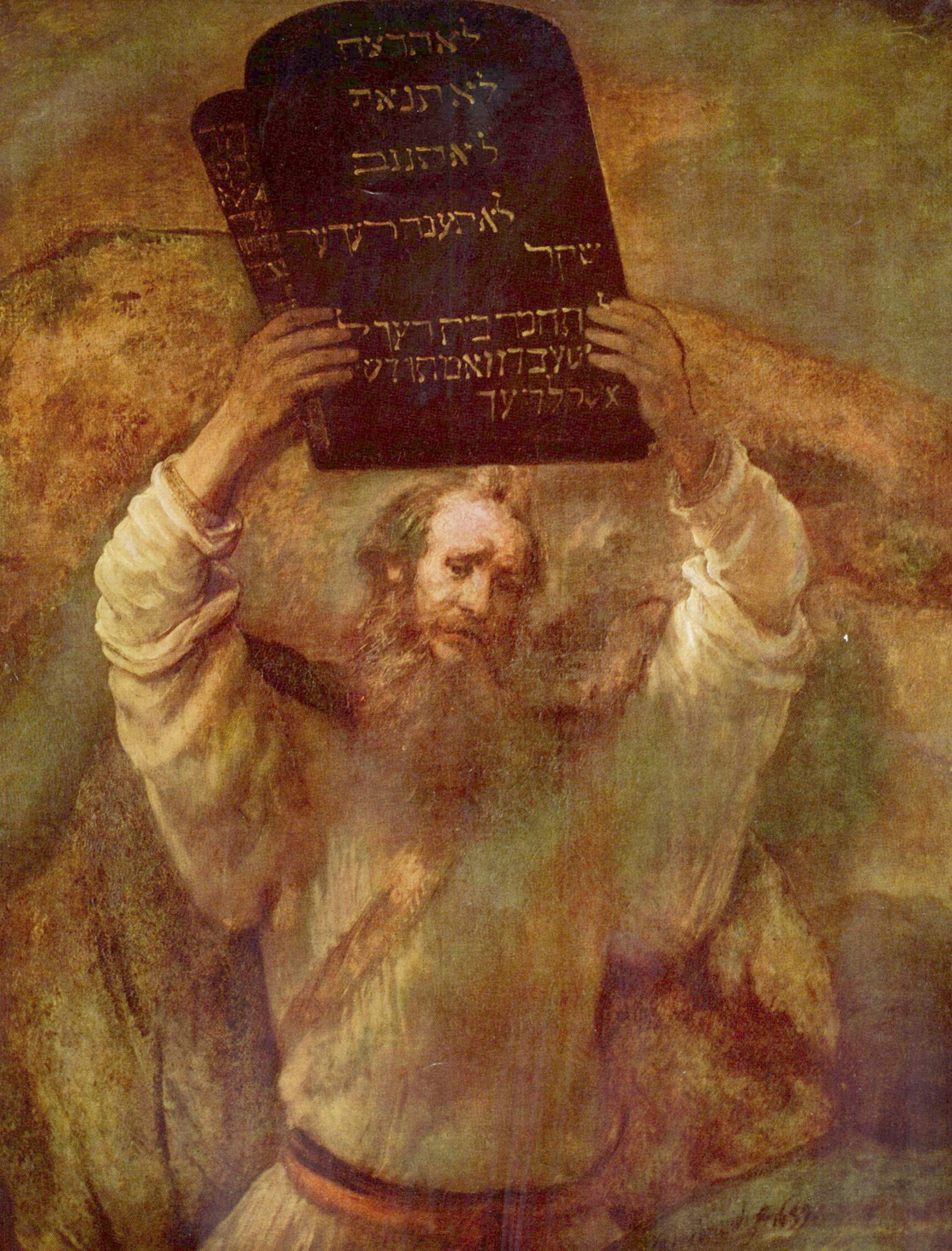
- Moses Breaking the Tablets of the Law by Rembrandt, 1659

Personal life
- Born: Goshen, Lower Egypt, Ancient Egypt
- Died: Mount Nebo, Moab, Transjordan (aged 120 in Jewish traditions)
- Spouse: Zipporah, unnamed Kushite woman
- Children: Gershom; Eliezer
- Parents: Amram (father); Jochebed (mother); Pharaoh's daughter (adoptive mother)
- Known for: The Mosaic covenant and law under the Torah for Judaism; Major prophet in Christianity, Islam, Bahá'í Faith, Druze faith, Rastafari, and Samaritanism
- Relatives: Levi (patrilineal great-grandfather); Miriam (sister); Aaron (brother); Jethro (father-in-law)

In Abrahamic religions, Moses (Note: /ˈmoʊzɪz, -zɪs/; Biblical Hebrew: מֹשֶׁה, romanized: Mōše; also known as Moshe or Moshe Rabbeinu (Mishnaic Hebrew: מֹשֶׁה רַבֵּינוּ, lit. 'Moshe our Teacher'); Syriac: ܡܘܫܐ, romanized: Mūše; Arabic: مُوسَىٰ, romanized: Mūsā; Ancient Greek: Mωϋσῆς, romanized: Mōÿsēs) was the Hebrew prophet who led the Israelites out of slavery in the Exodus from Egypt. (Note: Descriptions of Moses in various encyclopedias: "prophet, teacher, and leader"; "Prophet who led Israelites out of slavery in Egypt"; "leader, prophet, and lawgiver"; "primary leader of the Israelites in their Exodus from Egypt") He is considered the most important prophet in Judaism and Samaritanism, and one of the most important prophets in Christianity, Islam, the Baháʼí Faith, and other Abrahamic religions. According to the Abrahamic scriptures, God dictated the Mosaic Law to Moses, which he wrote down and which formed part of the Torah.

According to the Book of Exodus, Moses was born in a period when his people, the Israelites, who were an enslaved minority, were increasing in population; consequently, the Egyptian Pharaoh was worried that they might ally themselves with Egypt's enemies. When Pharaoh ordered all newborn Hebrew boys to be killed in order to reduce the population of the Israelites, Moses' Hebrew mother, Jochebed, secretly hid him in the bulrushes along the Nile river. The Pharaoh's daughter discovered the infant there and adopted him as a foundling. Thus, he grew up with the Egyptian royal family. After killing an Egyptian who was beating a Hebrew, Moses fled to Midian, where he encountered the Angel of the Lord, speaking to him from within a burning bush on Mount Horeb.

God sent Moses back to Egypt to demand the release of the Israelites from slavery. Moses objected that he could not speak eloquently, so God allowed Aaron, his elder brother, to speak for him. After the Ten Plagues, Moses led the Exodus of the Israelites out of Egypt and across the Red Sea, after which they based themselves at Mount Sinai, where Moses received the Ten Commandments. After 40 years of wandering in the desert, Moses died on Mount Nebo at the age of 120, within sight of the Promised Land.

The majority of scholars see the biblical Moses as a legendary figure, while retaining the possibility that Moses or a Moses-like figure existed in the 13th century BCE. The authors of Seder Olam Rabbah calculated a lifespan of Moses corresponding to 1391–1271 BCE; Jerome suggested 1592 BCE, and James Ussher suggested 1571 BCE as his birth year. (Note: The 17th-century Ussher chronology calculates 1571 BCE (Annals of the World, 1658 paragraph 164)) (Note: Saint Augustine records the names of the kings when Moses was born in The City of God: When Saphrus reigned as the fourteenth king of Assyria, and Orthopolis as the twelfth of Sicyon, and Criasus as the fifth of Argos, Moses was born in Egypt,... — Orthopolis reigned as the 12th King of Sicyon for 63 years, from 1596 to 1533 BCE; and Criasus reigned as the 5th King of Argos for 54 years, from 1637 to 1583 BCE.) Moses has often been portrayed in art, literature, music and film, and he is the subject of works at a number of U.S. government buildings.

== Etymology of name ==
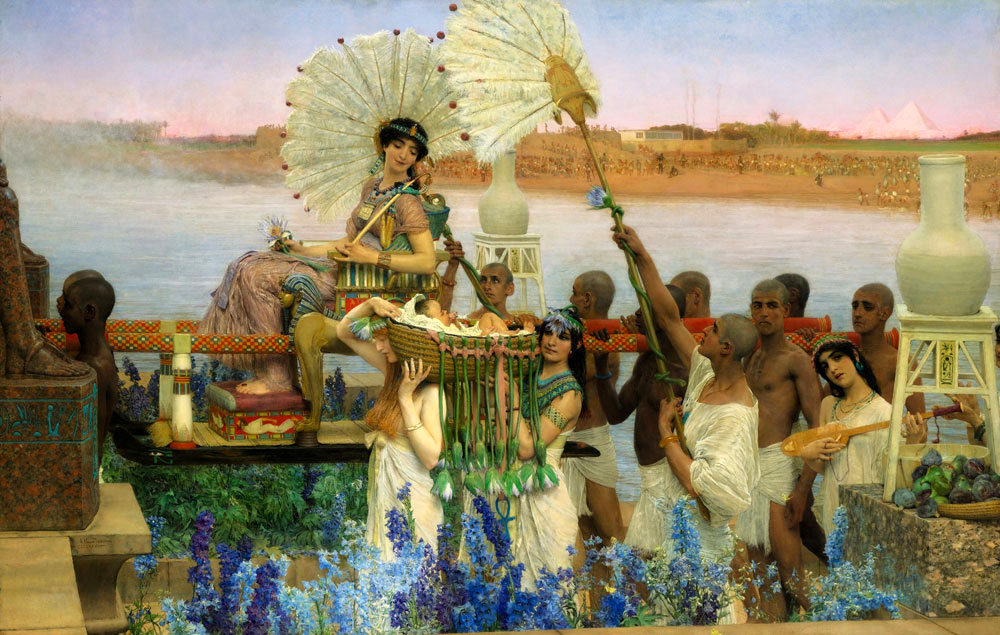
The Finding of Moses, painting by Sir Lawrence Alma-Tadema, 1904

The Egyptian root msy ('child of') or mose has been considered as a possible etymology, arguably an abbreviation of a theophoric name with the god's name omitted. The suffix mose appears in Egyptian pharaohs' names like Thutmose ('born of Thoth') and Ramose ('born of Ra'). One of the Egyptian names of Ramesses was Ra-mesesu mari-Amon, meaning 'born of Ra, beloved of Amon'. Ms by itself also has multiple attestations as an Egyptian personal name in the New Kingdom. Linguist Abraham Yahuda, based on the spelling given in the Tanakh, argues that it combines "water" or "seed" and "pond, expanse of water," thus yielding the sense of "child of the Nile" (mw-š).

The biblical account of Moses' birth provides him with a folk etymology to explain the ostensible meaning of his name. He is said to have received it from the Pharaoh's daughter: "he became her son. She named him Moses [מֹשֶׁה, Mōše], saying, 'I drew him out [מְשִׁיתִֽהוּ, mǝšīṯīhū] of the water'." This explanation links it to the Semitic root משׁה, m-š-h, meaning "to draw out". The eleventh-century Tosafist Isaac b. Asher haLevi noted that the princess names him the active participle 'drawer-out' (מֹשֶׁה, mōše), not the passive participle 'drawn-out' (נִמְשֶׁה, nīmše), in effect prophesying that Moses would draw others out (of Egypt); this has been accepted by some scholars.

The Hebrew etymology in the Biblical story may reflect an attempt to cancel out traces of Moses' Egyptian (i.e. Gentile) origins. The Egyptian character of his name was recognized as such by ancient Jewish writers like Philo and Josephus. Philo linked Moses' name (Ancient Greek: Μωϋσῆς, romanized: Mōysēs, lit. 'Mōusês') to the Egyptian (Coptic) word for 'water' (môu, μῶυ), in reference to his finding in the Nile and the biblical folk etymology. (Note: εἶτα δίδωσιν ὄνομα θεμένη Μωυσῆν ἐτύμως διὰ τὸ ἐκ τοῦ ὕδατος αὐτὸν ἀνελέσθαι· τὸ γὰρ ὕδωρ μῶυ ὀνομάζουσιν Αἰγύπτιοι — Philo of Alexandria, De Vita Mosis, I:4:17. Translation: "Since he had been taken up from the water, the princess gave him a name derived from this, and called him Moses, for Môu is the Egyptian word for water." — Colson, F. H., trans. 1935. On Abraham. On Joseph. On Moses, (Loeb Classical Library 289). Cambridge, Massachusetts: Harvard University Press. pp. 284–285.) Josephus, in his Antiquities of the Jews, claims that the second element, -esês, meant 'those who are saved'. The problem of how an Egyptian princess (who, according to the Biblical account found in the book of Exodus, gave him the name "Moses") could have known Hebrew puzzled medieval Jewish commentators like Abraham ibn Ezra and Hezekiah ben Manoah. Hezekiah suggested she either converted to the Jewish religion or took a tip from Jochebed (Moses' mother). The Egyptian princess who named Moses is not named in the book of Exodus. However, she was known to Josephus as Thermutis (identified as Tharmuth), and some within Jewish tradition have tried to identify her with a "daughter of Pharaoh" in 1 Chronicles 4:17 named Bithiah, but others note that this is unlikely since there is no textual indication that this daughter of Pharaoh is the same one who named Moses.

Ibn Ezra gave two possibilities for the name of Moses: he believed that it was either a translation of the Egyptian name instead of a transliteration or that the Pharaoh's daughter was able to speak Hebrew.

Kenneth Kitchen argues that the Hebrew etymology is most likely correct, as the sounds in the Hebrew m-š-h do not correspond to the pronunciation of Egyptian msy in the relevant time period. Thomas Schneider similarly proposes that the name is Semitic in origin, with the vowels and consonants of the root meaning "to draw or glean".

== Biblical narrative ==
=== Prophet and deliverer of Israel ===
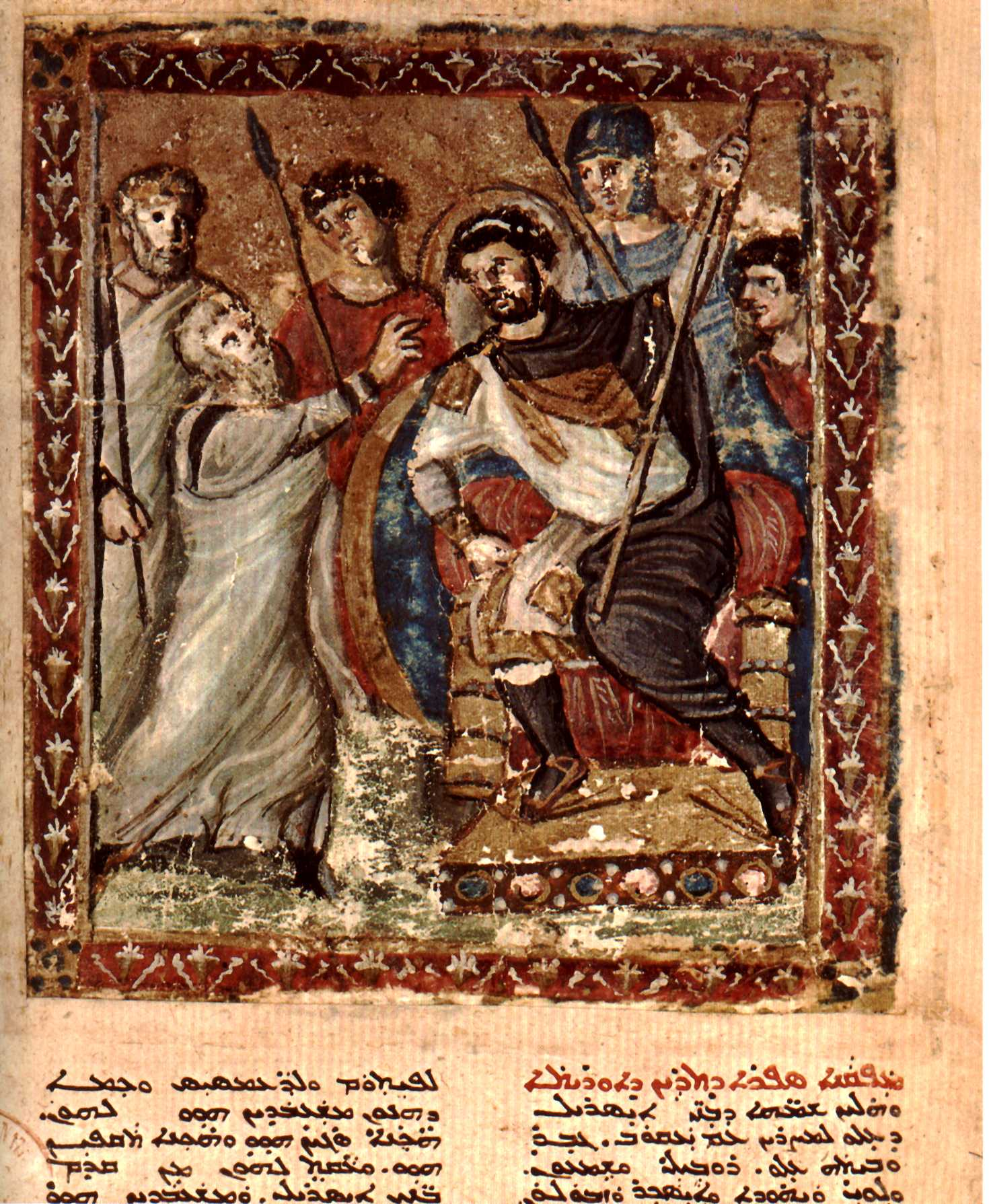
Moses before the Pharaoh, a sixth-century miniature from the Syriac Bible of Paris

The Israelites had settled in the Land of Goshen in the time of Joseph and Jacob, but a new Pharaoh arose who oppressed the children of Israel. At this time, Moses was born to his father Amram, son (or descendant) of Kehath the Levite, who entered Egypt with Jacob's household; his mother was Jochebed (also Yocheved), who was kin to Kehath. Moses had one older (by seven years) sister, Miriam, and one older (by three years) brother, Aaron. (Note: According to Manetho the place of his birth was at the ancient city of Heliopolis.) Pharaoh had commanded that all male Hebrew children born would be drowned in the river Nile, but Moses's mother placed him in an ark and concealed the ark in the bulrushes by the riverbank. He was discovered and adopted by Pharaoh's daughter and raised as an Egyptian. One day, after Moses had reached adulthood, he killed an Egyptian who was beating a Hebrew. To escape Pharaoh's death penalty, Moses fled to Midian (a desert country south of Judah), where he married Zipporah.

There, on Mount Horeb, God appeared to Moses as a burning bush, revealed his name, and commanded Moses to return to Egypt and bring his chosen people (Israel) out of bondage and into the Promised Land (Canaan). During the journey, God tried to kill Moses for failing to circumcise his son, but Zipporah saved his life. Moses returned to carry out God's command, but God enabled Pharaoh to refuse, and only after God had subjected Egypt to ten plagues did Pharaoh relent. Moses led the Israelites to the border of Egypt, but God hardened Pharaoh's heart once more so that he could destroy Pharaoh and his army at the Red Sea Crossing as a sign of his power to Israel and the nations.

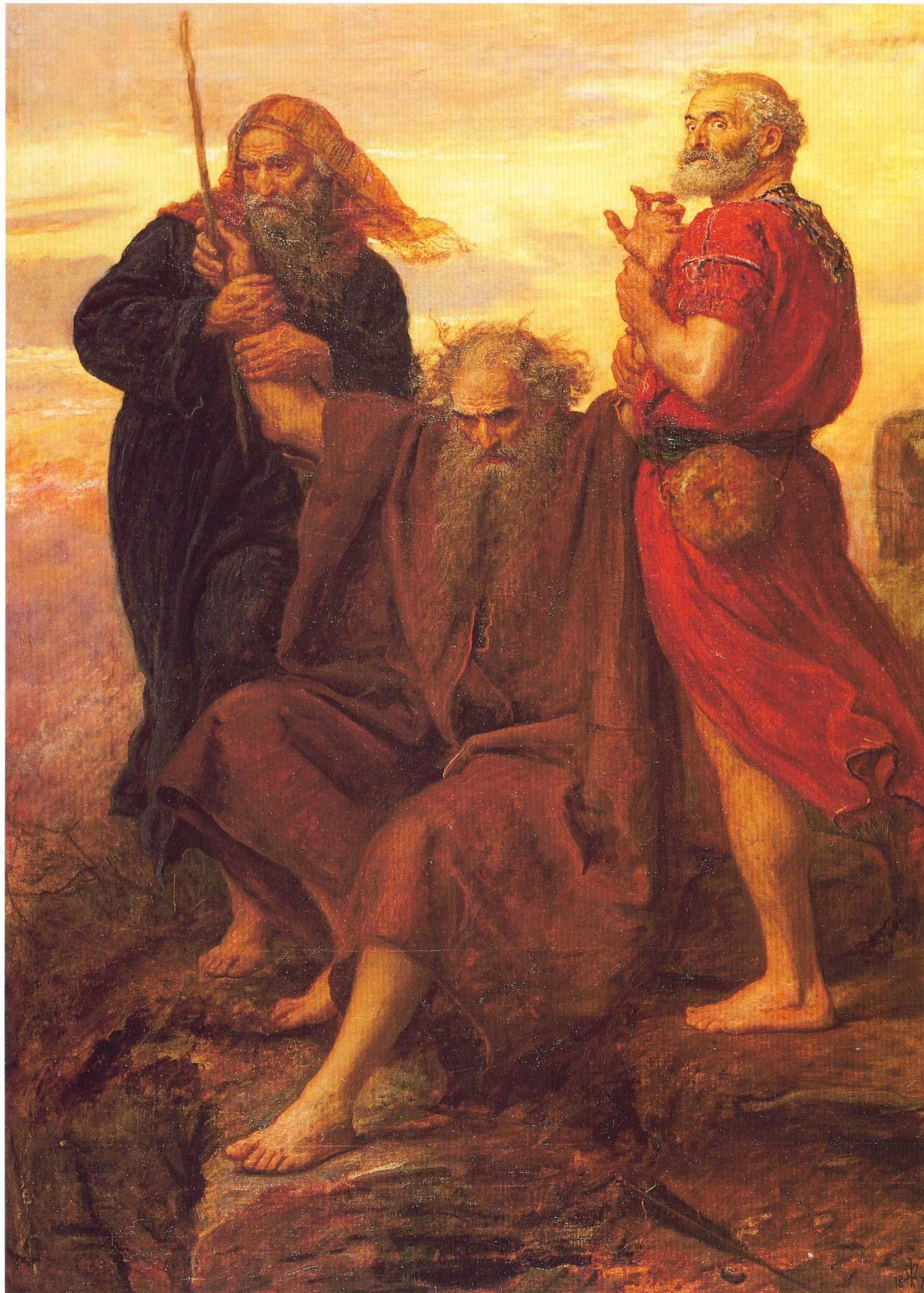
Victory O Lord!, 1871 painting by John Everett Millais, depicts Moses holding his staff, assisted by Aaron and Hur, holding up his arms during the battle against Amalek.

After defeating the Amalekites in Rephidim, Moses led the Israelites to Mount Sinai, where he was given the Ten Commandments from God, written on stone tablets. However, since Moses remained a long time on the mountain, some of the people feared that he might be dead, so they made a statue of a golden calf and worshipped it as an idol of God, thus disobeying and angering God and Moses. Moses, out of anger, broke the tablets and later ordered the elimination of those who had worshiped the golden statue, which was melted down and fed to the idolaters. God again wrote the Ten Commandments on a new set of tablets. Later at Mount Sinai, Moses and the elders entered into a covenant by which Israel would become the people of YHWH, obeying his laws, and YHWH would be their god. Moses delivered the laws of God to Israel, instituted the priesthood under the sons of Moses's brother Aaron, and destroyed those Israelites who fell away from his worship. In his final act at Sinai, God gave Moses instructions for the Tabernacle, the mobile shrine by which he would travel with Israel to the Promised Land.

From Sinai, Moses led the Israelites to the Desert of Paran on the border of Canaan. From there, he sent twelve spies into the land (Numbers 13–14). The spies returned with samples of the land's fertility but warned that its inhabitants were giants. The people were afraid and wanted to return to Egypt, and some rebelled against Moses and against God. Moses told the Israelites they were not worthy to inherit the land and would wander the wilderness for forty years until the generation who refused to enter Canaan died so their children would possess the land. Later on, Korah was punished for leading a revolt against Moses.

When the forty years had passed, Moses led the Israelites east around the Dead Sea to the territories of Edom and Moab. There they escaped the temptation of idolatry, conquered the lands of Og and Sihon in Transjordan, received God's blessing through Balaam the prophet, and massacred the Midianites, who by the end of the Exodus journey had become the enemies of the Israelites due to their notorious role in enticing the Israelites to sin against God. Moses was twice given notice that he would die before entry to the Promised Land: in Numbers 27:13, once he had seen the Promised Land from a viewpoint on Mount Abarim, and again in Numbers 31:1, once battle with the Midianites had been won.

On the banks of the Jordan River, in sight of the land, Moses assembled the tribes. After recalling their wanderings, he delivered God's laws by which they must live in the land, sang a song of praise and pronounced a blessing on the people, and passed his authority to Joshua, under whom they would possess the land. Moses then went up Mount Nebo, looked over the Promised Land spread out before him, and died at the age of 120:

So Moses the servant of the LORD died there in the land of Moab according to the word of the LORD. And He buried him in the valley in the land of Moab, opposite Beth-Peor, but no man knows his burial place to this day. (Deuteronomy 34:5–6, Amplified Bible)

=== Lawgiver of Israel ===
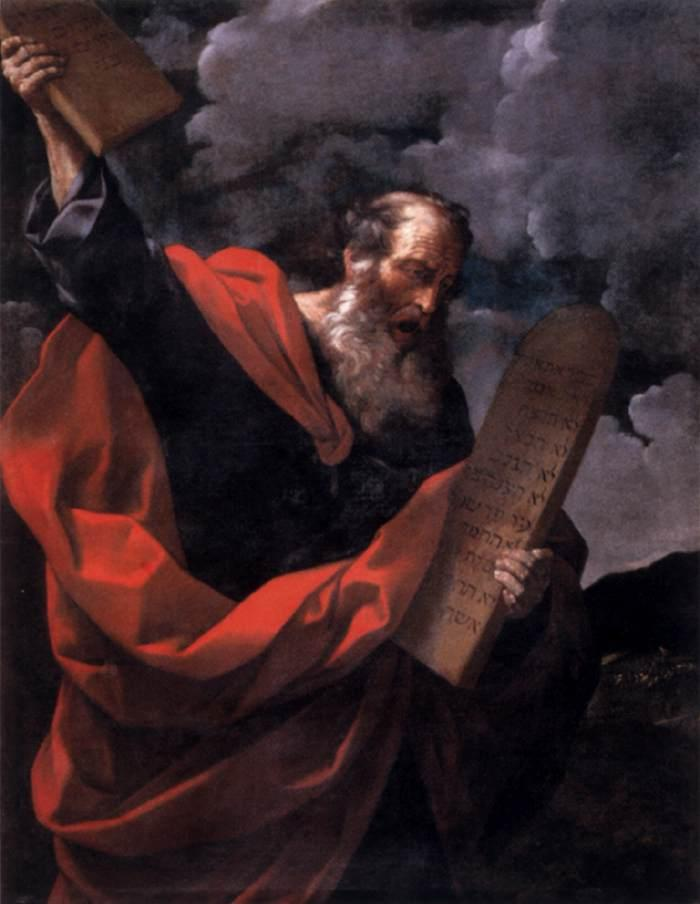
Moses with the Tables of the Law by Guido Reni, 1624

Moses is honored among Jews today as the "lawgiver of Israel": he delivered several sets of laws in the course of the Torah. The first is the Covenant Code, the terms of the covenant which God offers to the Israelites at Mount Sinai. Embedded in the covenant are the Decalogue (the Ten Commandments, Exodus 20:1–17), as well as the Book of the Covenant (Exodus 20:22–23:19). The Books of Leviticus and Numbers constitutes a second body of law, and the Book of Deuteronomy a third.

Moses has traditionally been regarded as the author of the Torah, the first section of the Hebrew Bible.

== Historicity ==
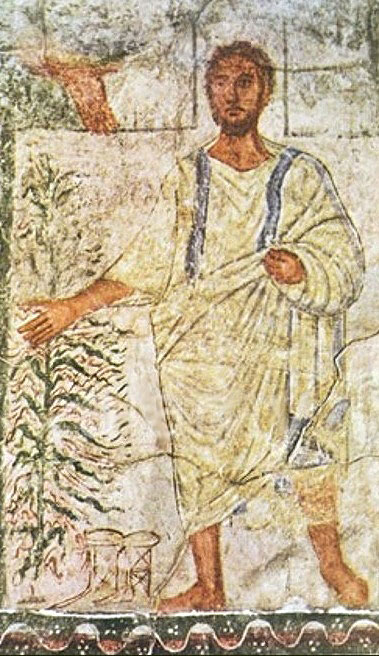
Moses and the burning bush. Painting from Dura-Europos synagogue, third century CE.

Scholars hold different opinions on the historicity of Moses. For instance, according to William G. Dever, the modern scholarly consensus is that the biblical person of Moses is largely mythical while also holding that "a Moses-like figure may have existed somewhere in the southern Transjordan" in the mid-to-late thirteenth century BCE, and that "archeology can do nothing" to prove or disprove either way. According to Solomon Nigosian, there are three prevailing views among biblical scholars: one is that Moses is not a historical figure, another view strives to anchor the decisive role he played in Israelite religion, and a third that argues there are elements of both history and legend from which "these issues are hotly debated unresolved matters among scholars". According to Brian Britt, there is divide among scholars when discussing matters on Moses that threatens gridlock. According to the official Torah commentary for Conservative Judaism, it is irrelevant if the historical Moses existed, calling him "the folkloristic, national hero".

Jan Assmann argues that it cannot be known if Moses ever lived because there are no traces of him outside tradition. Although the names of Moses and others in the biblical narratives are Egyptian and contain genuine Egyptian elements, no extra-biblical sources point clearly to Moses. No references to Moses appear in any Egyptian sources prior to the fourth century BCE, long after he is believed to have lived. No contemporary Egyptian sources mention Moses or the events of Exodus–Deuteronomy, nor has any archaeological evidence been discovered in Egypt or the Sinai wilderness to support the story in which he is the central figure. David Adams Leeming states that Moses is a mythic hero and the central figure in Hebrew mythology. The Oxford Companion to the Bible states that the historicity of Moses is the most reasonable (albeit not unbiased) assumption to be made about him, as his absence would leave a vacuum that cannot be explained away. Oxford Biblical Studies states that although few modern scholars are willing to support the traditional view that Moses himself wrote the five books of the Torah, there are certainly those who regard the leadership of Moses as too firmly based in Israel's collective memory to be dismissed as pious fiction.

The story of Moses' discovery follows a familiar motif in ancient Near Eastern mythological accounts of the ruler who rises from humble origins. For example, in the account of the origin of Sargon of Akkad (twenty-third century BCE):

My mother, the high priestess, conceived; in secret she bore me
She set me in a basket of rushes, with bitumen she sealed my lid
She cast me into the river which rose over me.

Moses' story, like those of the other patriarchs, most likely had a substantial oral prehistory. He is mentioned in the Book of Jeremiah and the Book of Isaiah. The earliest mention of him is vague, in the Book of Hosea and his name is apparently ancient, as the tradition found in Exodus gives it a folk etymology. Nevertheless, the Torah was completed by combining older traditional texts with newly-written ones.

Jean-Louis Ska argues that texts such as Isaiah 63:16 and Ezekiel 33:23–29, written during the Exile (i.e., in the first half of the sixth century BCE), testify to tension between the people of Judah and the returning post-Exilic Jews (the "gôlâ"). Whereas the Jews who had continuously lived in the land based their claim to the land on their descent from Abraham, the texts written by the exiles call God the true father of Israel and regard the Exodus under Moses as the true starting point of Israel's history.

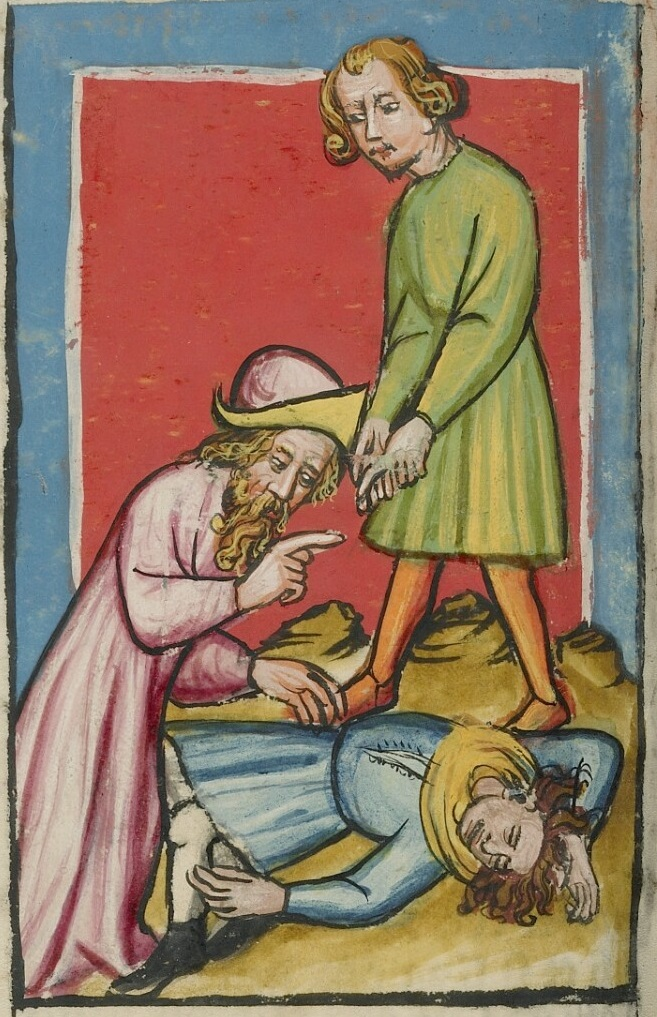
Moses Killing an Egyptian, early fifteenth-century depiction

A theory developed by Cornelis Tiele in 1872, which has proved influential, argued that Yahweh was a Midianite god, introduced to the Israelites by Moses, whose father-in-law Jethro was a Midianite priest. It was to such a Moses that Yahweh reveals his real name, hidden from the Patriarchs who knew him only as El Shaddai. Against this view is the modern consensus that most of the Israelites were native to Palestine. Martin Noth argued that the Pentateuch uses the figure of Moses, originally linked to legends of a Transjordan conquest, as a narrative bracket or late redactional device to weld together four of the five, originally independent, themes of that work. Manfred Görg and Rolf Krauss, the latter in a somewhat sensationalist manner, have suggested that the Moses story is a distortion or transmogrification of the historical vizier Amenmose (Vizier) (c. 1200 BCE), who was dismissed from office and whose name was later simplified to msy (Mose). Aidan Dodson regards this hypothesis as "intriguing, but beyond proof". Rudolf Smend argues that the two details about Moses that were most likely to be historical are his name, of Egyptian origin, and his marriage to a Midianite woman, details which seem unlikely to have been invented by the Israelites; in Smend's view, all other details given in the biblical narrative are too mythically charged to be seen as accurate data.

The name King Mesha of Moab has been linked to that of Moses. Mesha also is associated with narratives of an exodus and a conquest, and several motifs in stories about him are shared with the Exodus tale and that regarding Israel's war with Moab (2 Kings 3). Moab rebels against oppression, like Moses, leads his people out of Israel, as Moses does from Egypt, and his first-born son is slaughtered at the wall of Kir-hareseth as the firstborn of Israel are condemned to slaughter in the Exodus story, in what Calvinist theologian Peter Leithart described as "an infernal Passover that delivers Mesha while wrath burns against his enemies".

Other Egyptian figures which have been postulated as candidates for a historical Moses-like figure include the princes Ahmose-ankh and Ramose, who were sons of pharaoh Ahmose I, or a figure associated with the family of pharaoh Thutmose III.

=== Irsu ===
Biblical scholar Israel Knohl has proposed to identify Moses with Irsu, a Shasu. According to Papyrus Harris I, dated to approximately 1152 BC, and the Elephantine Stele, dated to the reign of pharaoh Setnakht, Irsu overthrew the ancient Egyptian government and took power with the support of "Asiatics" (people from the Levant) after the death of Queen Twosret. Upon coming to power, Irsu and his supporters disrupted ancient Egyptian rituals, halting offerings to the Egyptian deities and "treating the gods like the people". They were eventually defeated and expelled by the new Pharaoh Setnakhte. While fleeing, they abandoned large quantities of gold and silver they had stolen from the temples.

=== Osarseph ===
An Egyptian version of the tale that crosses over with the Moses story is found in Manetho who, according to the summary in Josephus, wrote that a certain Osarseph, an Egyptian Heliopolitan priest, became overseer of a band of lepers, when Amenophis (identified with either Amenhotep II, Amenhotep III, or Amenhotep IV), following indications by Amenhotep son of Hapu, had all the lepers in Egypt quarantined in order to cleanse the land so that he might see the gods. The lepers are bundled into Avaris, the former capital of the Hyksos, where Osarseph prescribes for them everything forbidden in Egypt, while proscribing everything permitted in Egypt. They invite the Hyksos to reinvade Egypt, rule with them for 13 years – Osarseph then assumes the name Moses – and are then driven out.

== Hellenistic literature ==
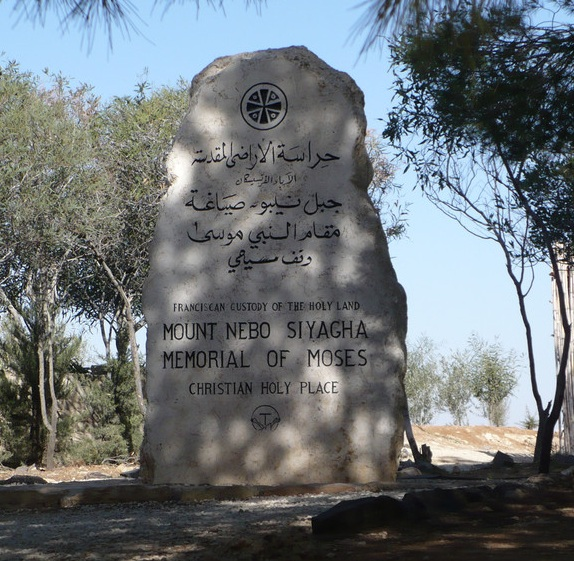
Memorial of Moses, Mount Nebo, Jordan

Non-biblical writings about Jews, with references to the role of Moses, first appear at the beginning of the Hellenistic period, from 323 BCE to about 146 BCE. Shmuel notes that "a characteristic of this literature is the high honour in which it holds the peoples of the East in general and some specific groups among these peoples".

In addition to the Judeo-Roman or Judeo-Hellenic historians Artapanus, Eupolemus, Josephus, and Philo, a few non-Jewish historians, including Hecataeus of Abdera (quoted by Diodorus Siculus), Alexander Polyhistor, Manetho, Apion, Chaeremon of Alexandria, Tacitus and Porphyry also make reference to him. The extent to which any of these accounts rely on earlier sources is unknown. Moses also appears in other religious texts such as the Mishnah (c. 200 CE) and the Midrash (200–1200 CE).

The figure of Osarseph in Hellenistic historiography is a renegade Egyptian priest who leads an army of lepers against the pharaoh and is finally expelled from Egypt, changing his name to Moses.

=== Hecataeus ===
The earliest reference to Moses in Greek literature occurs in the Egyptian history of Hecataeus of Abdera (fourth century BCE). All that remains of his description of Moses are two references made by Diodorus Siculus, wherein, writes historian Arthur Droge, he "describes Moses as a wise and courageous leader who left Egypt and colonized Judaea". Among the many accomplishments described by Hecataeus, Moses had founded cities, established a temple and religious cult, and issued laws:

After the establishment of settled life in Egypt in early times, which took place, according to the mythical account, in the period of the gods and heroes, the first ... to persuade the multitudes to use written laws was Mneves, a man not only great of soul but also in his life the most public-spirited of all lawgivers whose names are recorded.

Droge also points out that this statement by Hecataeus was similar to statements made subsequently by Eupolemus.

=== Artapanus ===
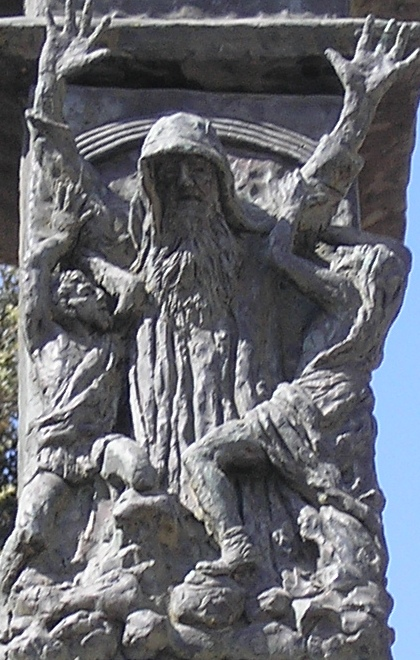
Depiction of Moses on the Knesset Menorah raising his arms during the battle against the Amalekites

The Jewish historian Artapanus of Alexandria (second century BCE) portrayed Moses as a cultural hero, alien to the Pharaonic court. According to theologian John Barclay, the Moses of Artapanus "clearly bears the destiny of the Jews, and in his personal, cultural and military splendor, brings credit to the whole Jewish people".

Jealousy of Moses' excellent qualities induced Chenephres to send him with unskilled troops on a military expedition to Ethiopia, where he won great victories. After having built the city of Hermopolis, he taught the people the value of the ibis as a protection against the serpents, making the bird the sacred guardian spirit of the city; then he introduced circumcision. After his return to Memphis, Moses taught the people the value of oxen for agriculture, and the consecration of the same by Moses gave rise to the cult of Apis. Finally, after having escaped another plot by killing the assailant sent by the king, Moses fled to Arabia, where he married the daughter of Raguel [Jethro], the ruler of the district.

Artapanus relates how Moses returns to Egypt with Aaron and is imprisoned but miraculously escapes through the name of YHWH to lead the Exodus. This account further testifies that all Egyptian temples of Isis thereafter contained a rod, in remembrance of that used for Moses' miracles. He describes Moses as 80 years old, "tall and ruddy, with long white hair, and dignified".

Some historians, however, point out the "apologetic nature of much of Artapanus' work", with his addition of extra-biblical details, such as his references to Jethro: the non-Jewish Jethro expresses admiration for Moses' gallantry in helping his daughters and chooses to adopt Moses as his son.

=== Strabo ===
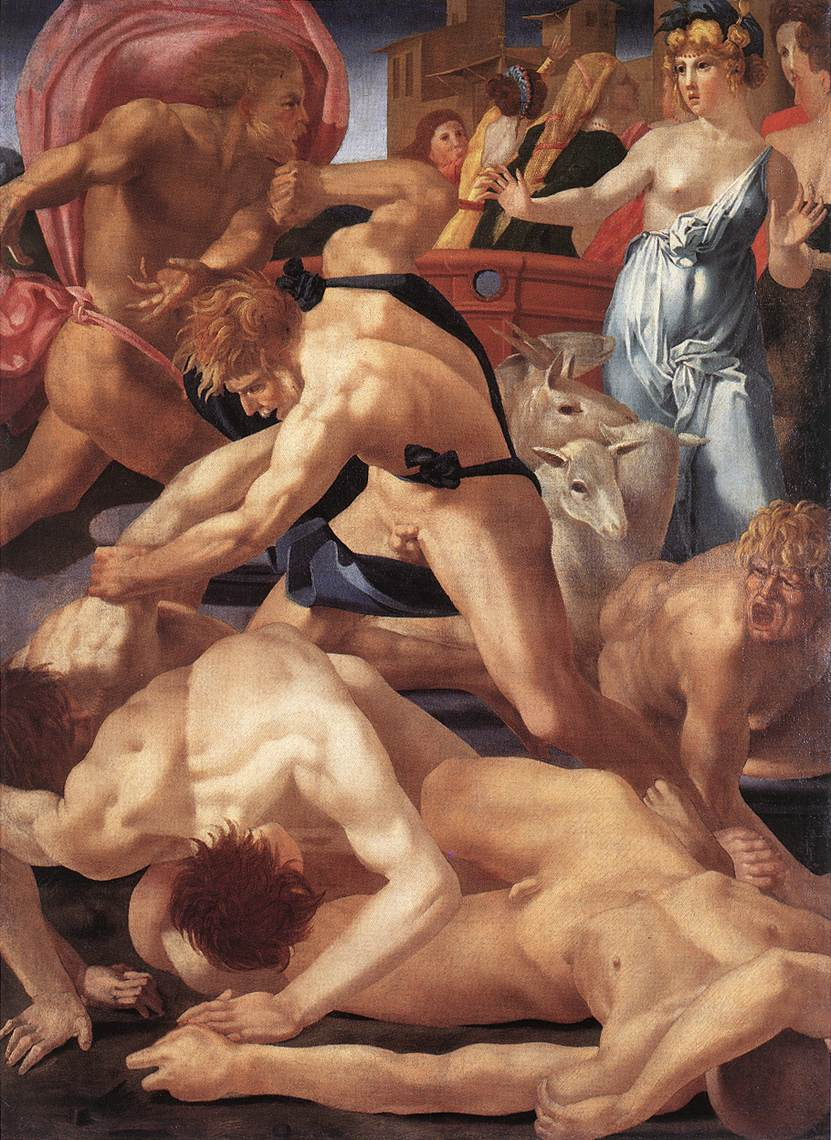
Moses Defends Jethro's Daughters by Rosso Fiorentino, c. 1523–1524

Strabo, a Greek historian, geographer, and philosopher, in his Geographica (c. 24 CE), wrote in detail about Moses, whom he considered to be an Egyptian who deplored the situation in his homeland, and thereby attracted many followers who respected the deity. He writes, for example, that Moses opposed the picturing of the deity in the form of man or animal and was convinced that the deity was an entity that encompassed everything – land and sea:

35. An Egyptian priest named Moses, who possessed a portion of the country called the Lower Egypt, being dissatisfied with the established institutions there, left it and came to Judaea with a large body of people who worshipped the Divinity. He declared and taught that the Egyptians and Africans entertained erroneous sentiments, in representing the Divinity under the likeness of wild beasts and cattle of the field; that the Greeks also were in error in making images of their gods after the human form. For God [said he] may be this one thing which encompasses us all, land and sea, which we call heaven, or the universe, or the nature of things....

36. By such doctrine Moses persuaded a large body of right-minded persons to accompany him to the place where Jerusalem now stands.

In Strabo's writings of the history of Judaism as he understood it, he describes various stages in its development: from the first stage, including Moses and his direct heirs, to the final stage where "the Temple of Jerusalem continued to be surrounded by an aura of sanctity". Strabo's "positive and unequivocal appreciation of Moses' personality is among the most sympathetic in all ancient literature." His portrayal of Moses is said to be similar to the writing of Hecataeus who "described Moses as a man who excelled in wisdom and courage".

Egyptologist Jan Assmann concludes that Strabo was the historian "who came closest to a construction of Moses' religion as monotheistic and as a pronounced counter-religion." It recognized "only one divine being whom no image can represent ... [and] the only way to approach this god is to live in virtue and in justice."

=== Tacitus ===
The Roman historian Tacitus (c. 56–120 CE) refers to Moses by noting that the Jewish religion was monotheistic and without a clear image. His primary work, wherein he describes Jewish philosophy, is his Histories (c. 100), where, according to the eighteenth-century translator and Irish dramatist Arthur Murphy, as a result of the Jewish worship of one God, "pagan mythology fell into contempt". Tacitus states that, despite various opinions current in his day regarding the Jews' ethnicity, most of his sources are in agreement that there was an Exodus from Egypt. By his account, the Pharaoh Bocchoris, suffering from a plague, banished the Jews in response to an oracle of the god Zeus-Amun.

A motley crowd was thus collected and abandoned in the desert. While all the other outcasts lay idly lamenting, one of them, named Moses, advised them not to look for help to gods or men, since both had deserted them, but to trust rather in themselves, and accept as divine the guidance of the first being, by whose aid they should get out of their present plight.

In this version, Moses and the Jews wander through the desert for only six days, capturing the Holy Land on the seventh.

=== Longinus ===
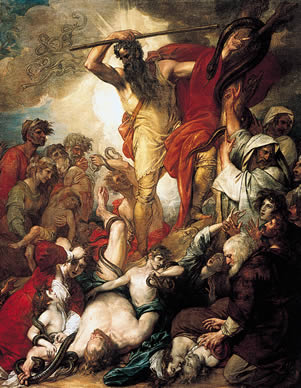
Moses lifts up the brass serpent, curing the Israelites from poisonous snake bites in The Brazen Sepent, a 1790 painting by Benjamin West.

The Septuagint, the Greek version of the Hebrew Bible, impressed the pagan author of the famous classical book of literary criticism, On the Sublime, traditionally attributed to Longinus. The date of composition is unknown, but it is commonly assigned to the late first century CE.

The writer quotes Genesis in a "style which presents the nature of the deity in a manner suitable to his pure and great being", but he does not mention Moses by name, calling him 'no chance person' (οὐχ ὁ τυχὼν ἀνήρ) but "the Lawgiver" (θεσμοθέτης, thesmothete) of the Jews, a term that puts him on a par with Lycurgus and Minos. Aside from a reference to Cicero, Moses is the only non-Greek writer quoted in the work; contextually he is put on a par with Homer, and he is described "with far more admiration than even Greek writers who treated Moses with respect, such as Hecataeus and Strabo".

=== Josephus ===
In Josephus' (37 – c. 100 CE) Antiquities of the Jews, Moses is mentioned throughout. For example, Book VIII Ch. IV describes Solomon's Temple, also known as the First Temple, at the time the Ark of the Covenant was first moved into the newly built temple:

When King Solomon had finished these works, these large and beautiful buildings, and had laid up his donations in the temple, and all this in the interval of seven years, and had given a demonstration of his riches and alacrity therein; ... he also wrote to the rulers and elders of the Hebrews, and ordered all the people to gather themselves together to Jerusalem, both to see the temple which he had built, and to remove the ark of God into it; and when this invitation of the whole body of the people to come to Jerusalem was everywhere carried abroad, ... The Feast of Tabernacles happened to fall at the same time, which was kept by the Hebrews as a most holy and most eminent feast. So they carried the ark and the tabernacle which Moses had pitched, and all the vessels that were for ministration to the sacrifices of God, and removed them to the temple. ... Now the ark contained nothing else but those two tables of stone that preserved the ten commandments, which God spake to Moses in Mount Sinai, and which were engraved upon them ...

According to Feldman, Josephus also attaches particular significance to Moses' possession of the "cardinal virtues of wisdom, courage, temperance, and justice". He also includes piety as an added fifth virtue. In addition, he "stresses Moses' willingness to undergo toil and his careful avoidance of bribery. Like Plato's philosopher-king, Moses excels as an educator."

=== Numenius ===
Numenius of Apamea, a Greek philosopher who was a native of Apamea, in Syria, wrote during the latter half of the second century CE. Historian Kenneth Guthrie writes that "Numenius is perhaps the only recognized Greek philosopher who explicitly studied Moses, the prophets, and the life of Jesus". He describes his background:

Numenius was a man of the world; he was not limited to Greek and Egyptian mysteries, but talked familiarly of the myths of Brahmins and Magi. It is however his knowledge and use of the Hebrew scriptures which distinguished him from other Greek philosophers. He refers to Moses simply as "the prophet", exactly as for him Homer is the poet. Plato is described as a Greek Moses.

=== Justin Martyr ===
The Christian saint and religious philosopher Justin Martyr (103–165 CE) drew the same conclusion as Numenius, according to other experts. Theologian Paul Blackham notes that Justin considered Moses to be "more trustworthy, profound and truthful because he is older than the Greek philosophers." He quotes him:

I will begin, then, with our first prophet and lawgiver, Moses ... that you may know that, of all your teachers, whether sages, poets, historians, philosophers, or lawgivers, by far the oldest, as the Greek histories show us, was Moses, who was our first religious teacher.

== Abrahamic religions ==
=== Judaism ===
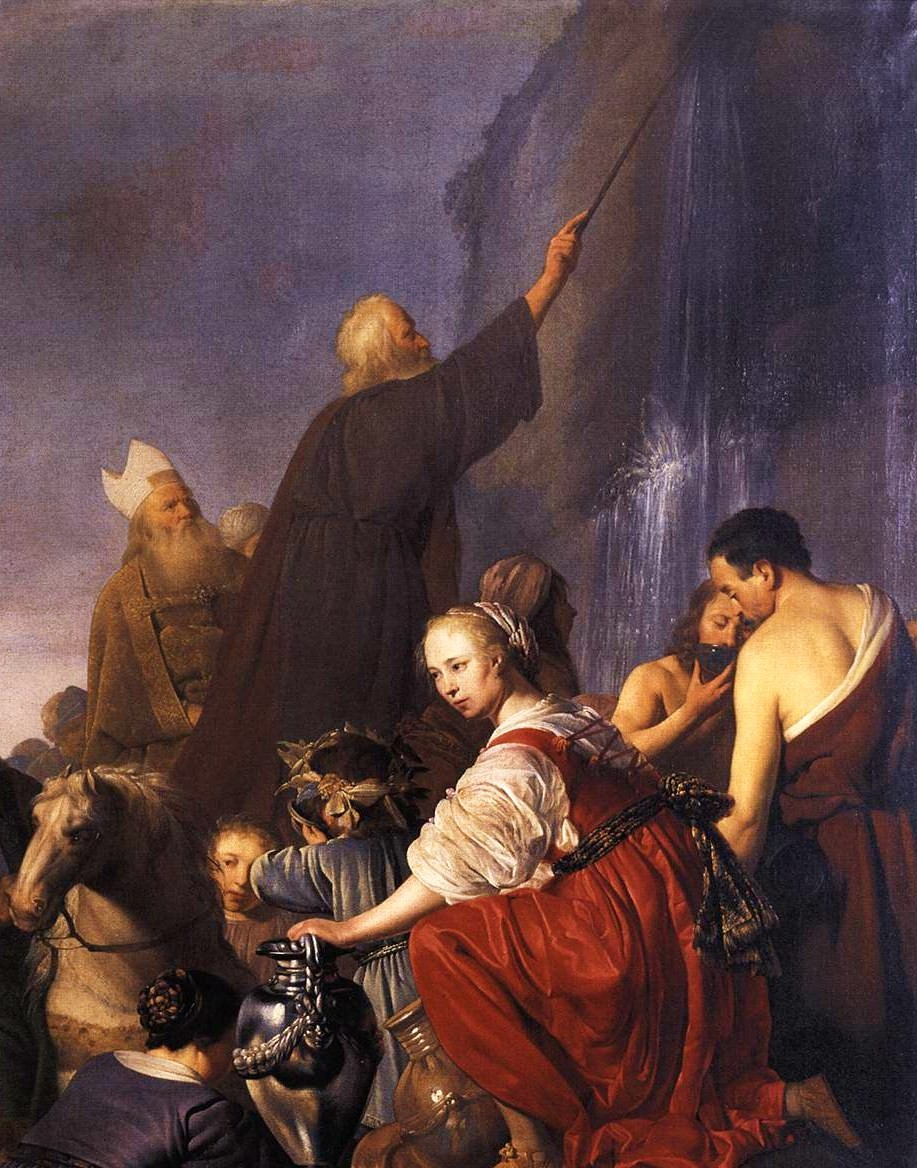
Moses striking the rock, by Pieter de Grebber, 1630

Most of what is known about Moses from the Bible comes from the books of Exodus, Leviticus, Numbers, and Deuteronomy. The majority of scholars consider the compilation of these books to go back to the Persian period, 538–332 BCE, but based on earlier written and oral traditions. There is a wealth of stories and additional information about Moses in the Jewish apocrypha and in the genre of rabbinical exegesis known as Midrash, as well as in the primary works of the Jewish oral law, the Mishnah and the Talmud. Moses is also given a number of bynames in Jewish tradition. The Midrash identifies Moses as one of seven biblical personalities who were called by various names. Moses' other names were Jekuthiel (by his mother), Heber (by his father), Jered (by Miriam), Avi Zanoah (by Aaron), Avi Gedor (by Kohath), Avi Soco (by his wet-nurse), Shemaiah ben Nethanel (by people of Israel). Moses is also attributed the names Toviah (as a first name), and Levi (as a family name) (Vayikra Rabbah 1:3), Heman, Mechoqeiq (lawgiver), and Ehl Gav Ish (Numbers 12:3). In another exegesis, Moses had ascended to the first heaven until the seventh, even visited Paradise and Hell alive, after he saw the divine vision in Mount Horeb.

Jewish historians who lived at Alexandria, such as Eupolemus, attributed to Moses the feat of having taught the Phoenicians their alphabet, similar to legends of Thoth. Artapanus of Alexandria explicitly identified Moses not only with Thoth/Hermes, but also with the Greek figure Musaeus (whom he called "the teacher of Orpheus") and ascribed to him the division of Egypt into 36 districts, each with its own liturgy. He named the princess who adopted Moses as Merris, wife of Pharaoh Chenephres.

Jewish tradition considers Moses to be the greatest prophet who ever lived. Despite his importance, Judaism stresses that Moses was a human being, and is therefore not to be worshipped. Only God is worthy of worship in Judaism.

To Orthodox Jews, Moses is called Moshe Rabbenu, 'Eved HaShem, Avi haNeviim zya"a: "Our Leader Moshe, Servant of God, Father of all the Prophets (may his merit shield us, amen)". In the orthodox view, Moses received not only the Torah, but also the revealed (written and oral) and the hidden (the 'hokhmat nistar) teachings, which gave Judaism the Zohar of the Rashbi, the Torah of the Ari haQadosh and all that is discussed in the Heavenly Yeshiva between the Ramhal and his masters.

Arising in part from his age of death (120 years, according to Deuteronomy 34:7) and that "his eye had not dimmed, and his vigor had not diminished", the phrase "may you live to 120" has become a common blessing among Jews (120 is stated as the maximum age for all of Noah's descendants in Genesis 6:3).

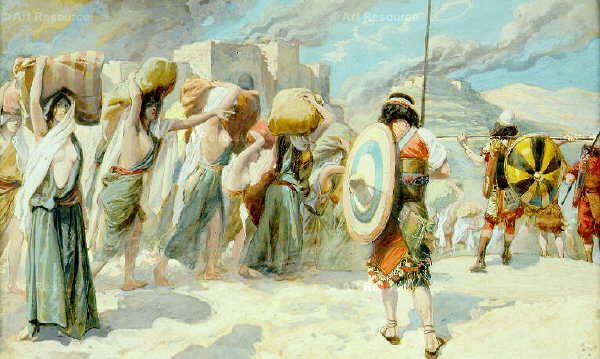
The Women of Midian Led Captive by the Hebrews, James Tissot c. 1900

Rabbi Joel Grossman argued that the story is a "powerful fable of lust and betrayal", and that Moses' execution of the women was a symbolic condemnation of those who seek to turn sex and desire to evil purposes. He says that the Midianite women "used their sexual attractiveness to turn the Israelite men away from God and toward the worship of Baal Peor". Rabbi Grossman argues that the genocide of all the Midianite non-virgin women, including those that did not seduce Jewish men, was fair because some of them had sex for "improper reasons". Alan Levin, an educational specialist with the Reform movement, has similarly suggested that the story should be taken as a cautionary tale, to "warn successive generations of Jews to watch their own idolatrous behavior". Chasam Sofer emphasizes that this war was not fought at Moses' behest, but was commanded by God as an act of revenge against the Midianite women, who, according to the Biblical account, had seduced the Israelites and led them to sin. Linguist Keith Allan remarked: "God's work or not, this is military behaviour that would be tabooed today and might lead to a war crimes trial."

=== Christianity ===
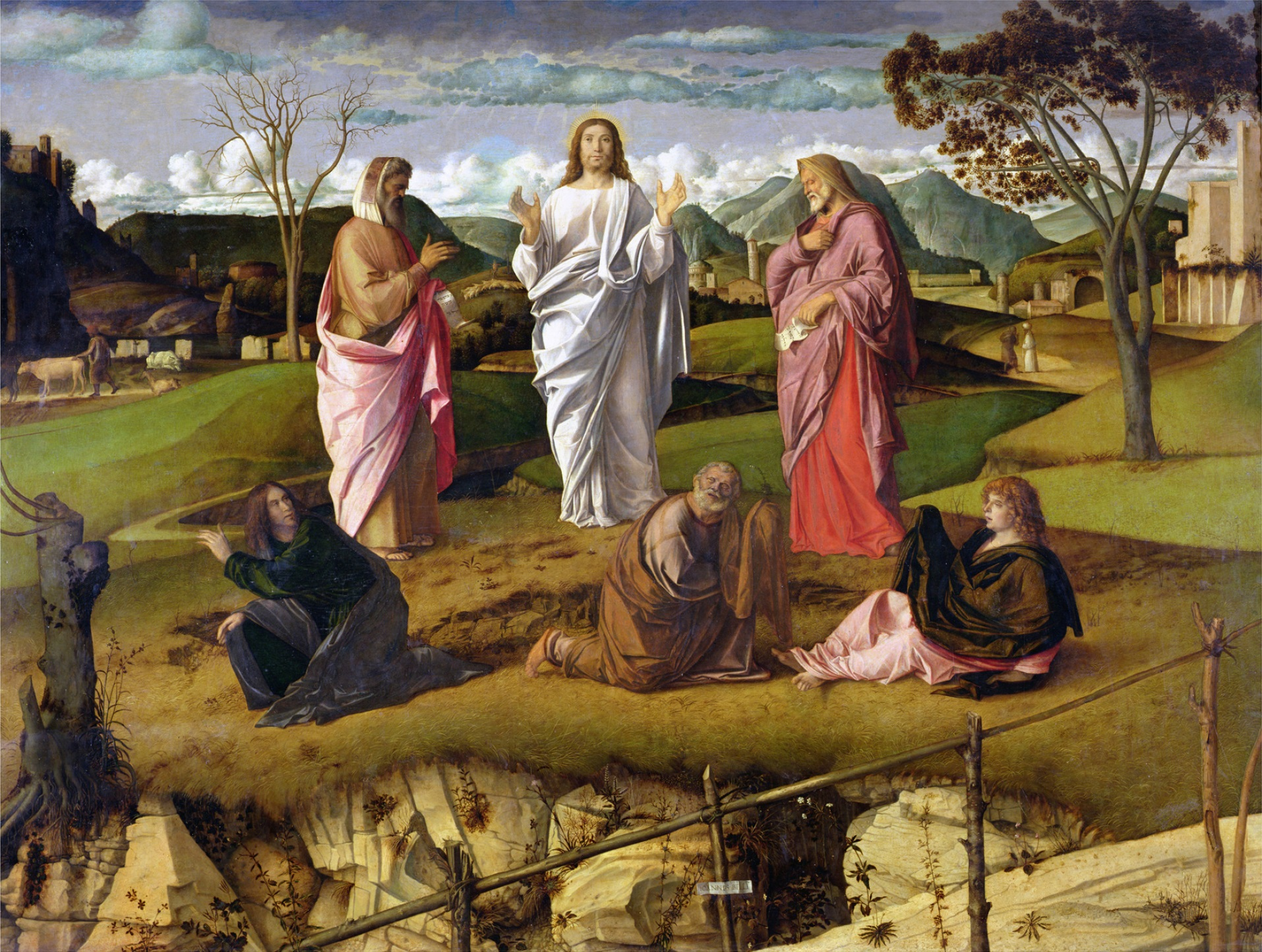
Moses, to the left of Jesus, at the Transfiguration of Jesus, by Giovanni Bellini, c. 1480

Moses is mentioned more often in the New Testament than any other Old Testament figure. For Christians, Moses is often a symbol of God's law, as reinforced and expounded on in the teachings of Jesus. New Testament writers often compared Jesus' words and deeds with Moses' to explain Jesus' mission. In Acts 7:39–43, 51–53, for example, the rejection of Moses by the Jews who worshipped the golden calf is likened to the rejection of Jesus by the Jews that continued in traditional Judaism. Comparisons such as these are examples of the interpretive method known as typology, which holds that early biblical figures can be seen as anticipatory prefigures of Jesus Christ. This method is influential in the theology of many branches of Christianity, including Catholicism and Protestantism.

Moses also figures in several of Jesus' messages. When he met the Pharisee Nicodemus at night in John 3, he compared Moses' lifting up of the bronze serpent in the wilderness, which any Israelite could look at and be healed, to his own lifting up (by his death and resurrection) for the people to look at and be healed. In John 6, Jesus responded to the people's claim that Moses provided them manna in the wilderness by saying that it was not Moses, but God, who provided. Calling himself the "bread of life", Jesus stated that he was provided to feed God's people.

Moses, along with Elijah, is presented as meeting with Jesus in all three Synoptic Gospels of the Transfiguration of Jesus in Matthew 17, Mark 9, and Luke 9. In Matthew 23, in what is the first attested use of a phrase referring to this rabbinic usage (the Graeco-Aramaic קתדרא דמשה), Jesus refers to the scribes and the Pharisees, in a passage critical of them, as having seated themselves "on the chair of Moses" (Greek: Ἐπὶ τῆς Μωϋσέως καθέδρας, epì tēs Mōüséōs kathédras).

His relevance to modern Christianity has not diminished. Moses is considered to be a saint by several churches; and is commemorated as a prophet in the respective Calendars of Saints of the Eastern Orthodox Church, the Roman Catholic Church, and the Lutheran churches on September 4. In Eastern Orthodox liturgics for September 4, Moses is commemorated as the "Holy Prophet and God-seer Moses, on Mount Nebo". (Note: According to the Orthodox Menaion, September 4 was the day that Moses saw the Land of Promise.) The Orthodox Church also commemorates him on the Sunday of the Forefathers, two Sundays before the Nativity. Moses is also commemorated on July 20 with Aaron, Elias (Elijah) and Eliseus (Elisha) and on April 14 with all saint Sinai monks.

The Armenian Apostolic Church commemorates him as one of the Holy Forefathers in their Calendar of Saints on July 30.

Womanist Biblical scholar Nyasha Junior has argued that Moses can be the object of feminist inquiry.

==== Mormonism ====
Members of the Church of Jesus Christ of Latter-day Saints (colloquially called Mormons) generally view Moses in the same way that other Christians do. However, in addition to accepting the biblical account of Moses, Mormons include Selections from the Book of Moses as part of their scriptural canon. This book is believed to be the translated writings of Moses and is included in the Pearl of Great Price.

Latter-day Saints are also unique in believing that Moses was taken to heaven without having tasted death (translated). In addition, Joseph Smith and Oliver Cowdery stated that on April 3, 1836, Moses appeared to them in the Kirtland Temple (located in Kirtland, Ohio) in a glorified, immortal, physical form and bestowed upon them the "keys of the gathering of Israel from the four parts of the earth, and the leading of the ten tribes from the land of the north".

=== Islam ===
Moses is mentioned more in the Quran than any other individual and his life is narrated and recounted more than that of any other Islamic prophet. In Islam, Moses is characterized in ways which parallel Muhammad. Like Muhammad, Moses is defined in the Quran as both prophet (nabi) and messenger (rasul), the latter term indicating that he was one of those prophets who brought a book and law to his people.

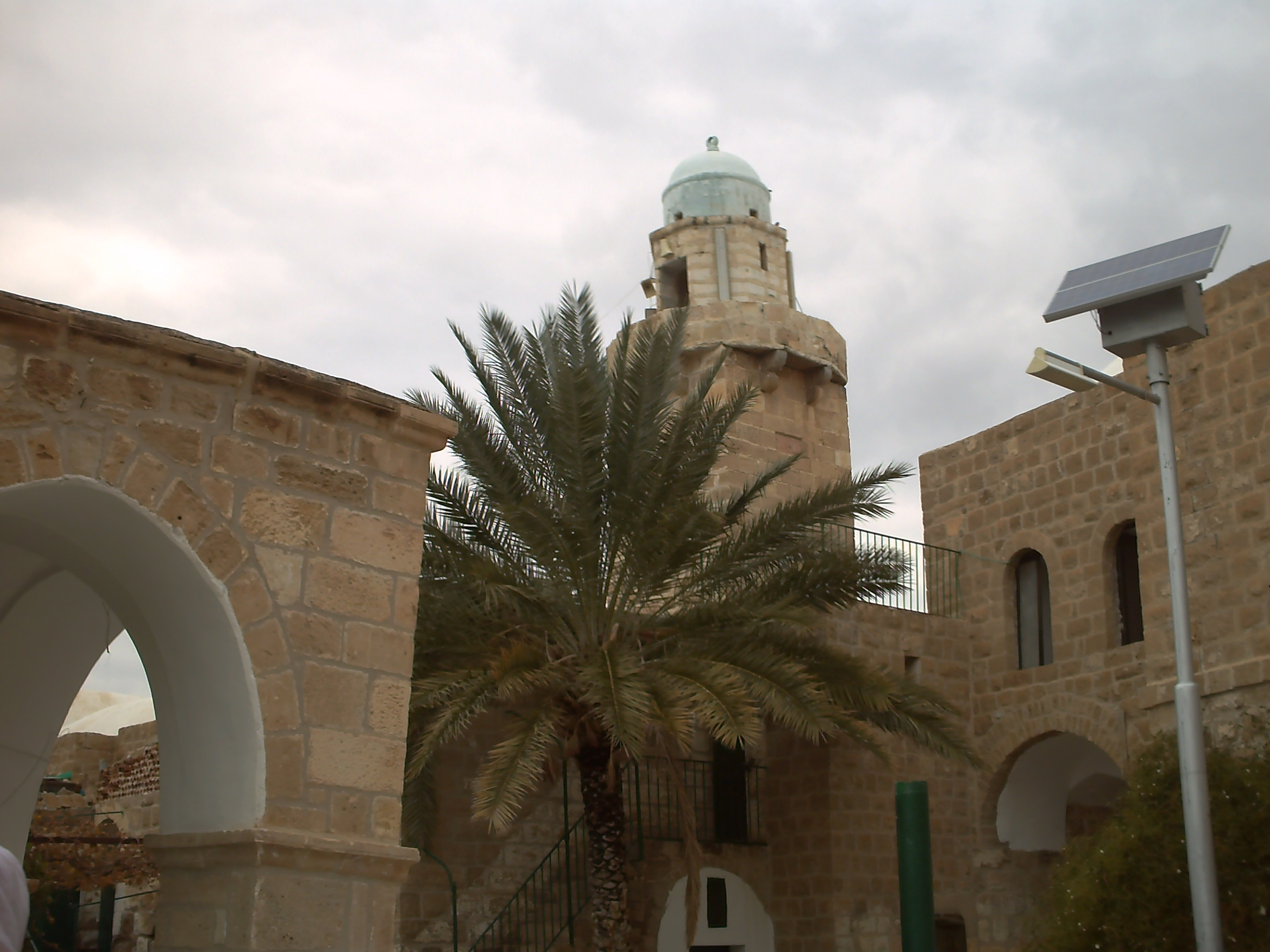
Maqam El-Nabi Musa, Jericho

Most of the key events in Moses' life which are narrated in the Bible are to be found dispersed through the different chapters (suwar) of the Quran, with a story about meeting the Quranic figure Khidr which is not found in the Bible.

In the Moses' story narrated by the Quran, Jochebed is commanded by God to place Moses in a coffin and cast him on the waters of the Nile, thus abandoning him completely to God's protection. The Pharaoh's wife Asiya, not his daughter, found Moses floating in the waters of the Nile. She convinced the Pharaoh to keep him as their son because they were not blessed with any children.

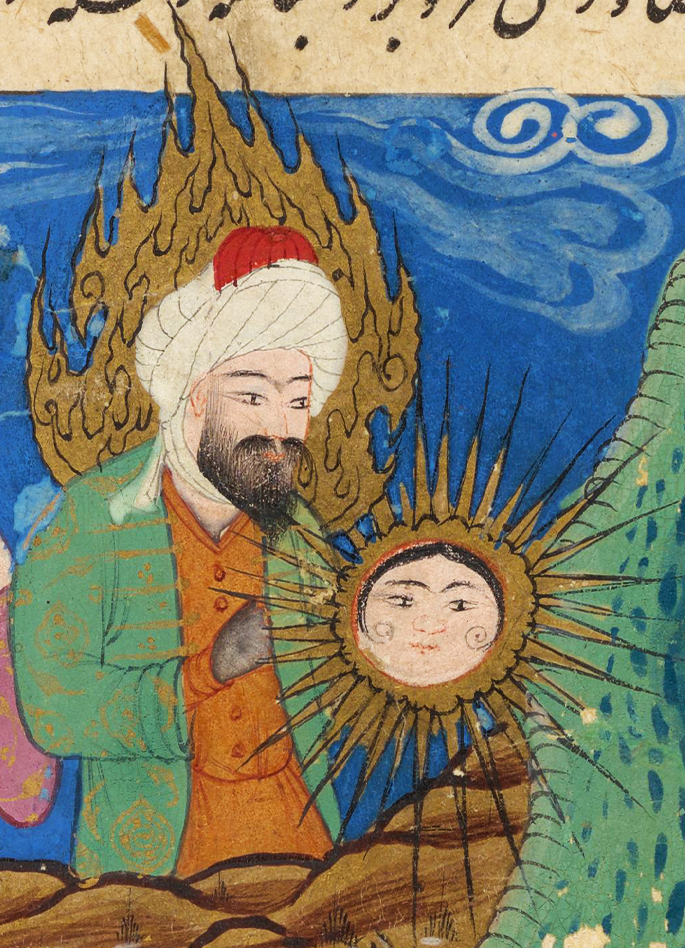
Islamic miniature of Musa winning his battle against the Pharaoh's magicians, casting divine light with his hand and turning his staff into a dragon.

The Quran's account emphasizes Moses' mission to invite the Pharaoh to accept God's divine message as well as give salvation to the Israelites. According to the Quran, Moses encourages the Israelites to enter Canaan, but they are unwilling to fight the Canaanites, fearing certain defeat. Moses responds by pleading to Allah that he and his brother Aaron be separated from the rebellious Israelites, after which the Israelites are made to wander for 40 years.

One of the hadith, or traditional narratives about Muhammad's life, describes a meeting in heaven between Moses and Muhammad, which resulted in Muslims observing five daily prayers. Huston Smith says this was "one of the crucial events in Muhammad's life".

According to some Islamic tradition, Moses is buried at Maqam El-Nabi Musa, near Jericho.

=== Baháʼí Faith ===
Moses is one of the most important of God's messengers in the Baháʼí Faith, being designated a Manifestation of God. An epithet of Moses in Baháʼí scriptures is the "One Who Conversed with God".

According to the Baháʼí Faith, Bahá'u'lláh, the founder of the faith, is the one who spoke to Moses from the burning bush.

ʻAbdu'l-Bahá has highlighted the fact that Moses, like Abraham, had none of the makings of a great man of history, but through God's assistance he was able to achieve many great things. He is described as having been "for a long time a shepherd in the wilderness", of having had a stammer, and of being "much hated and detested" by Pharaoh and the ancient Egyptians of his time. He is said to have been raised in an oppressive household, and to have been known, in Egypt, as a man who had committed murder – though he had done so in order to prevent an act of cruelty.

Nevertheless, like Abraham, through the assistance of God, he achieved great things and gained renown even beyond the Levant. Chief among these achievements was the freeing of his people, the Hebrews, from bondage in Egypt and leading "them to the Holy Land". He is viewed as the one who bestowed on Israel "the religious and the civil law" which gave them "honour among all nations", and which spread their fame to different parts of the world.

Furthermore, through the law, Moses is believed to have led the Hebrews "to the highest possible degree of civilization at that period". 'Abdul'l-Bahá asserts that the ancient Greek philosophers regarded "the illustrious men of Israel as models of perfection". Chief among these philosophers, he says, was Socrates who "visited Syria, and took from the children of Israel the teachings of the Unity of God and of the immortality of the soul".

Moses is further seen as paving the way for Bahá'u'lláh and his ultimate revelation, and as a teacher of truth, whose teachings were in line with the customs of his time.

=== Druze faith ===
Moses is considered an important prophet of God in the Druze faith, being among the seven prophets who appeared in different periods of history.

== Legacy in politics and law ==
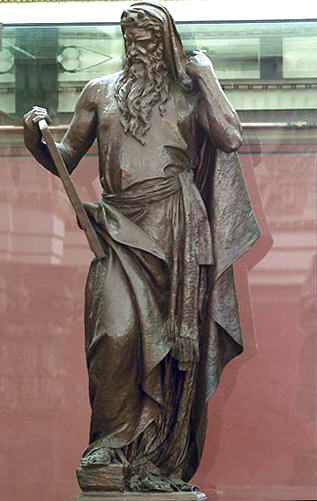
Statue of Moses at the Library of Congress

In a metaphorical sense in the Christian tradition, a "Moses" has been referred to as the leader who delivers the people from a terrible situation. Among the Presidents of the United States known to have used the symbolism of Moses were Harry S. Truman, Jimmy Carter, Ronald Reagan, Bill Clinton, George W. Bush and Barack Obama, who referred to his supporters as "the Moses generation".

In subsequent years, theologians linked the Ten Commandments with the formation of early democracy. Scottish theologian William Barclay described them as "the universal foundation of all things ... the law without which nationhood is impossible. ... Our society is founded upon it." Pope Francis addressed the United States Congress in 2015 stating that all people need to "keep alive their sense of unity by means of just legislation ... [and] the figure of Moses leads us directly to God and thus to the transcendent dignity of the human being".

=== In United States history ===
==== Pilgrims ====
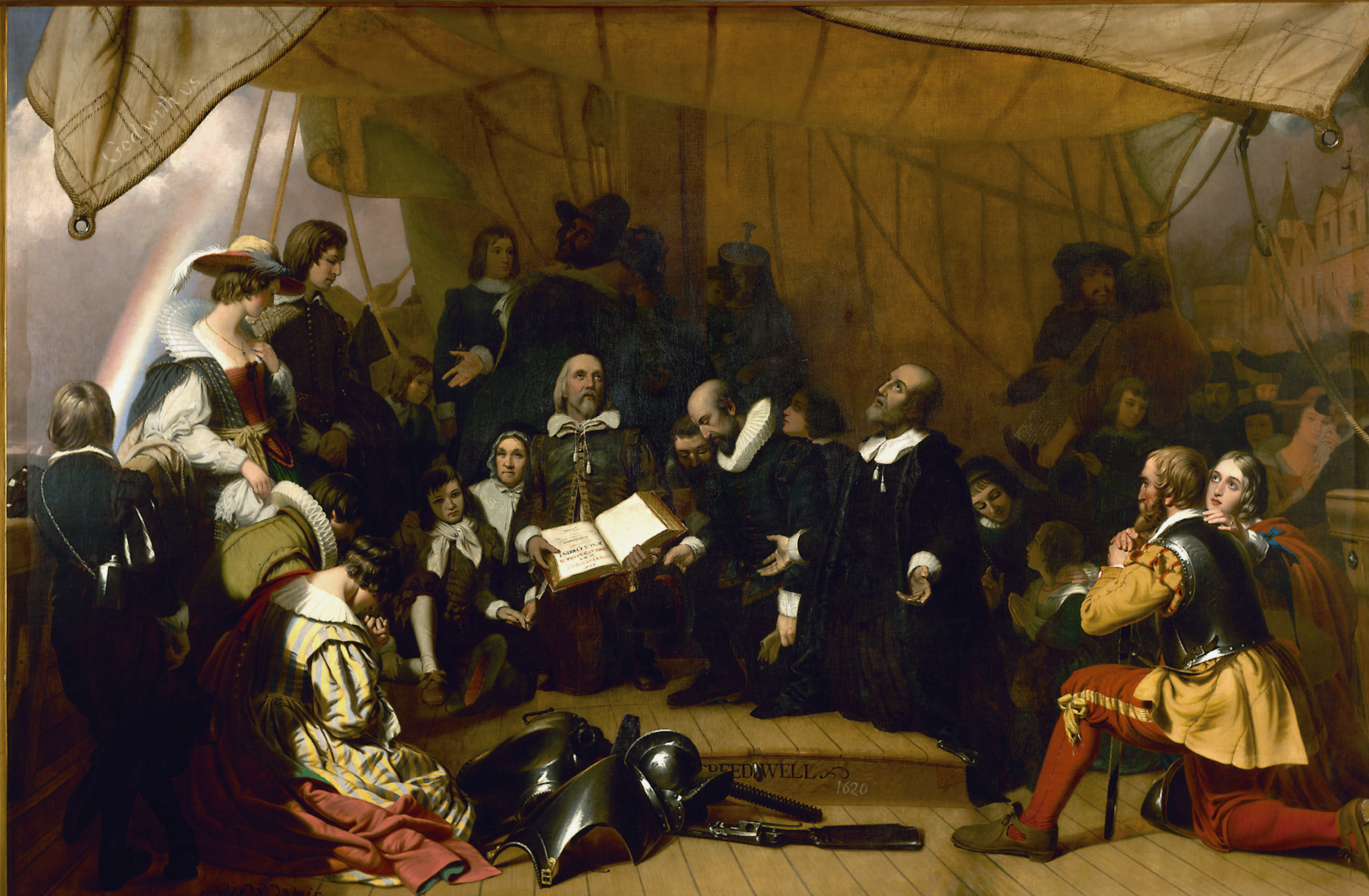
Pilgrims John Carver, William Bradford, and Miles Standish, at prayer during their voyage to North America. 1844 painting by Robert Walter Weir.

References to Moses were used by the Puritans, who relied on the story of Moses to give meaning and hope to the lives of Pilgrims seeking religious and personal freedom in North America. John Carver was the first governor of Plymouth Colony and first signer of the Mayflower Compact, which he wrote in 1620 during the ship Mayflower's three-month voyage. He inspired the Pilgrims with a "sense of earthly grandeur and divine purpose", notes historian Jon Meacham, and was called the "Moses of the Pilgrims". Early American writer James Russell Lowell noted the similarity of the founding of America by the Pilgrims to that of ancient Israel by Moses:

Next to the fugitives whom Moses led out of Egypt, the little shipload of outcasts who landed at Plymouth are destined to influence the future of the world. The spiritual thirst of mankind has for ages been quenched at Hebrew fountains; but the embodiment in human institutions of truths uttered by the Son of Man eighteen centuries ago was to be mainly the work of Puritan thought and Puritan self-devotion. ... If their municipal regulations smack somewhat of Judaism, yet there can be no nobler aim or more practical wisdom than theirs; for it was to make the law of man a living counterpart of the law of God, in their highest conception of it.

Following Carver's death the following year, William Bradford was made governor. He feared that the remaining Pilgrims would not survive the hardships of the new land, with half their people having already died within months of arriving. Bradford evoked the symbol of Moses to the weakened and desperate Pilgrims to help calm them and give them hope: "Violence will break all. Where is the meek and humble spirit of Moses?" William G. Dever explains the attitude of the Pilgrims: "We considered ourselves the 'New Israel', particularly we in America. And for that reason, we knew who we were, what we believed in and valued, and what our 'manifest destiny' was."

==== Founding Fathers of the United States ====
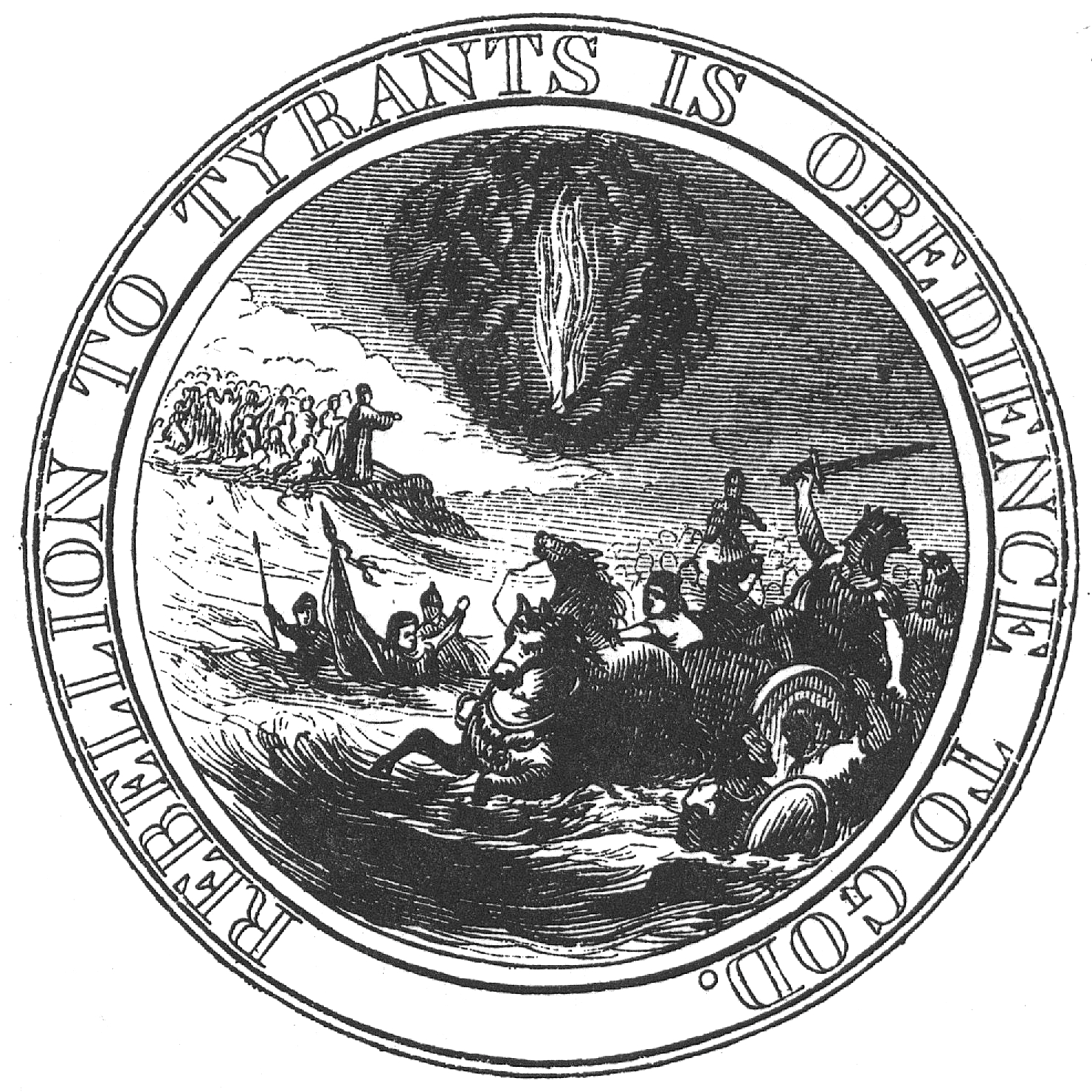
First proposed seal of the United States, 1776

On July 4, 1776, immediately after the Declaration of Independence was officially passed, the Continental Congress asked John Adams, Thomas Jefferson, and Benjamin Franklin to design a seal that would clearly represent a symbol for the new United States. They chose the symbol of Moses leading the Israelites to freedom.

After the death of George Washington in 1799, two thirds of his eulogies referred to him as "America's Moses", with one orator saying that "Washington has been the same to us as Moses was to the Children of Israel."

Benjamin Franklin, in 1788, saw the difficulties that some of the newly independent American states were having in forming a government, and proposed that until a new code of laws could be agreed to, they should be governed by "the laws of Moses", as contained in the Old Testament. He justified his proposal by explaining that the laws had worked in biblical times: "The Supreme Being ... having rescued them from bondage by many miracles, performed by his servant Moses, he personally delivered to that chosen servant, in the presence of the whole nation, a constitution and code of laws for their observance."

John Adams, the second president of the United States, stated why he relied on the laws of Moses over Greek philosophy for establishing the United States Constitution: "As much as I love, esteem, and admire the Greeks, I believe the Hebrews have done more to enlighten and civilize the world. Moses did more than all their legislators and philosophers." Swedish historian Hugo Valentin credited Moses as the "first to proclaim the rights of man".

In the late eighteenth century, the deist and critic of orthodox Christianity Thomas Paine commented at length on Moses' Laws in The Age of Reason (1794, 1795, and 1807). Paine considered Moses to be a "detestable villain", and cited Numbers 31 as an example of his "unexampled atrocities". In the passage, after the Israelite army returned from conquering Midian, Moses orders the killing of the Midianites with the exception of the virgin girls who were to be kept for the Israelites.

Have ye saved all the women alive? behold, these caused the children of Israel, through the counsel of Balaam, to commit trespass against the Lord in the matter of Peor, and there was a plague among the congregation of the Lord. Now, therefore, kill every male among the little ones, and kill every woman that hath known a man by lying with him; but all the women-children, that have not known a man by lying with him, keep alive for yourselves.

— Numbers 31

==== Slavery and civil rights ====
Underground Railroad conductor and American Civil War veteran Harriet Tubman was nicknamed "Moses" due to her various missions in freeing and ferrying escaped enslaved persons to freedom in the free states of the United States.

Historian Gladys L. Knight describes how leaders who emerged during and after the period in which slavery was legal often personified the Moses symbol. "The symbol of Moses was empowering in that it served to amplify a need for freedom." Therefore, when Abraham Lincoln was assassinated in 1865 after the passage of the amendment to the Constitution outlawing slavery, Black Americans said they had lost "their Moses". Lincoln biographer Charles Carleton Coffin writes, "The millions whom Abraham Lincoln delivered from slavery will ever liken him to Moses, the deliverer of Israel."

Martin Luther King Jr., a leader of the civil rights movement during the 1960s, was called "a modern Moses", and often referred to Moses in his speeches: "The struggle of Moses, the struggle of his devoted followers as they sought to get out of Egypt. This is something of the story of every people struggling for freedom."

== Cultural portrayals and references ==
=== Art ===
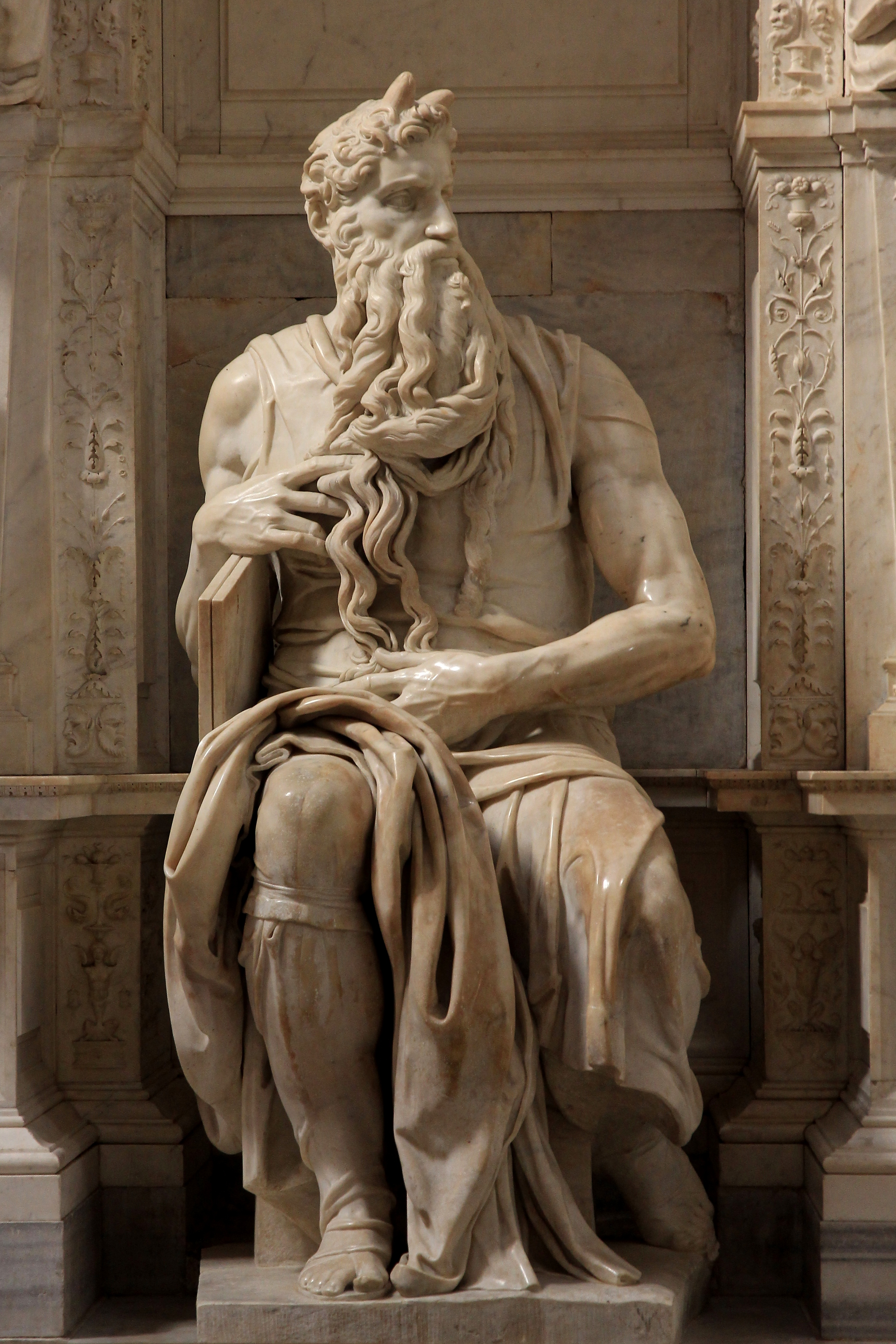
Moses, with horns, by Michelangelo, 1513–1515, San Pietro in Vincoli, Rome

Moses often appears in Christian art, and the Pope's private chapel, the Sistine Chapel, has a large sequence of six frescos of the life of Moses on the southern wall, opposite a set with the Life of Christ. They were painted in 1481–82 by a group of mostly Florentine artists including Sandro Botticelli and Pietro Perugino.

Because of an ambiguity in the Hebrew word קֶרֶן (keren) meaning both horn and ray or beam, in Jerome's Latin Vulgate translation of the Bible Moses' face is described as cornutam ("horned") when descending from Mount Sinai with the tablets, Moses is usually shown in Western art until the Renaissance with small horns, which at least served as a convenient identifying attribute. In at least some of these depictions, an antisemitic meaning is likely to have been intended, for example on the Hereford Mappa Mundi.

With the prophet Elijah, he is a necessary figure in the Transfiguration of Jesus in Christian art, a subject with a long history in Eastern Orthodox art. It appears in the art of the Western Church from the tenth century, and was especially popular between about 1475 and 1535.

==== Michelangelo's statue ====
Michelangelo's statue of Moses (1513–1515), in the Church of San Pietro in Vincoli, Rome, is one of the most familiar statues in the world. The horns the sculptor included on Moses' head are the result of a mistranslation of the Hebrew Bible into the Latin Vulgate Bible with which Michelangelo was familiar. The Hebrew word taken from Exodus means either a "horn" or an "irradiation". Experts at the Archaeological Institute of America show that the term was used when Moses "returned to his people after seeing as much of the Glory of the Lord as human eye could stand", and his face "reflected radiance". In early Jewish art, moreover, Moses is often "shown with rays coming out of his head".

==== Depiction on U.S. government buildings ====
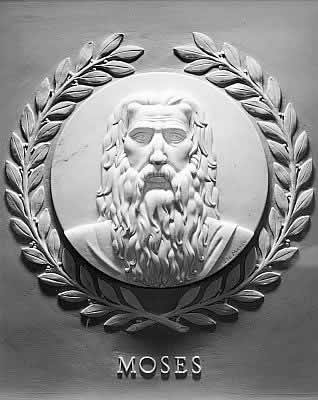
Sculpture in the U.S. House of Representatives

Moses is depicted in several U.S. government buildings because of his legacy as a lawgiver. In the Library of Congress stands a large statue of Moses alongside a statue of Paul the Apostle. Moses is one of the twenty-three lawgivers depicted in marble bas-reliefs in the chamber of the U.S. House of Representatives in the United States Capitol. The plaque's overview states: "Moses (c. 1350–1250 B.C.) Hebrew prophet and lawgiver; transformed a wandering people into a nation; received the Ten Commandments."

The other 22 figures have their profiles turned to Moses, which is the only forward-facing bas-relief.

Moses appears eight times in carvings that ring the Supreme Court Great Hall ceiling. His face is presented along with other ancient figures such as Solomon, the Greek god Zeus, and the Roman goddess of wisdom, Minerva. The Supreme Court Building's east pediment depicts Moses holding two tablets. Tablets representing the Ten Commandments can be found carved in the oak courtroom doors, on the support frame of the courtroom's bronze gates, and in the library woodwork. A controversial image is one that sits directly above the Chief Justice of the United States' head. In the center of the 40-foot-long (12 m) Spanish marble carving is a tablet displaying Roman numerals I through X, with some numbers partially hidden.

=== Literature ===
- Sigmund Freud, in his last book, Moses and Monotheism in 1939, postulated that Moses was an Egyptian nobleman who adhered to the monotheism of Akhenaten. Following a theory proposed by a contemporary biblical critic, Freud believed that Moses was murdered in the wilderness, producing a collective sense of patricidal guilt that has been at the heart of Judaism ever since. "Judaism had been a religion of the father, Christianity became a religion of the son", he wrote. The possible Egyptian origin of Moses and of his message has received significant scholarly attention. Opponents of this view observe that the religion of the Torah seems different from Atenism in everything except the central feature of devotion to a single god, although this has been countered by a variety of arguments, e.g. pointing out the similarities between the Hymn to Aten and Psalm 104. Freud's interpretation of the historical Moses is not well accepted among historians, and is considered pseudohistory by many.
- Thomas Mann's novella The Tables of the Law (1944) is a retelling of the story of the Exodus from Egypt, with Moses as its main character.
- W. G. Hardy's novel All the Trumpets Sounded (1942) tells a fictionalized life of Moses.
- Orson Scott Card's novel Stone Tables (1997) is based on the life of Moses.

=== Film and television ===
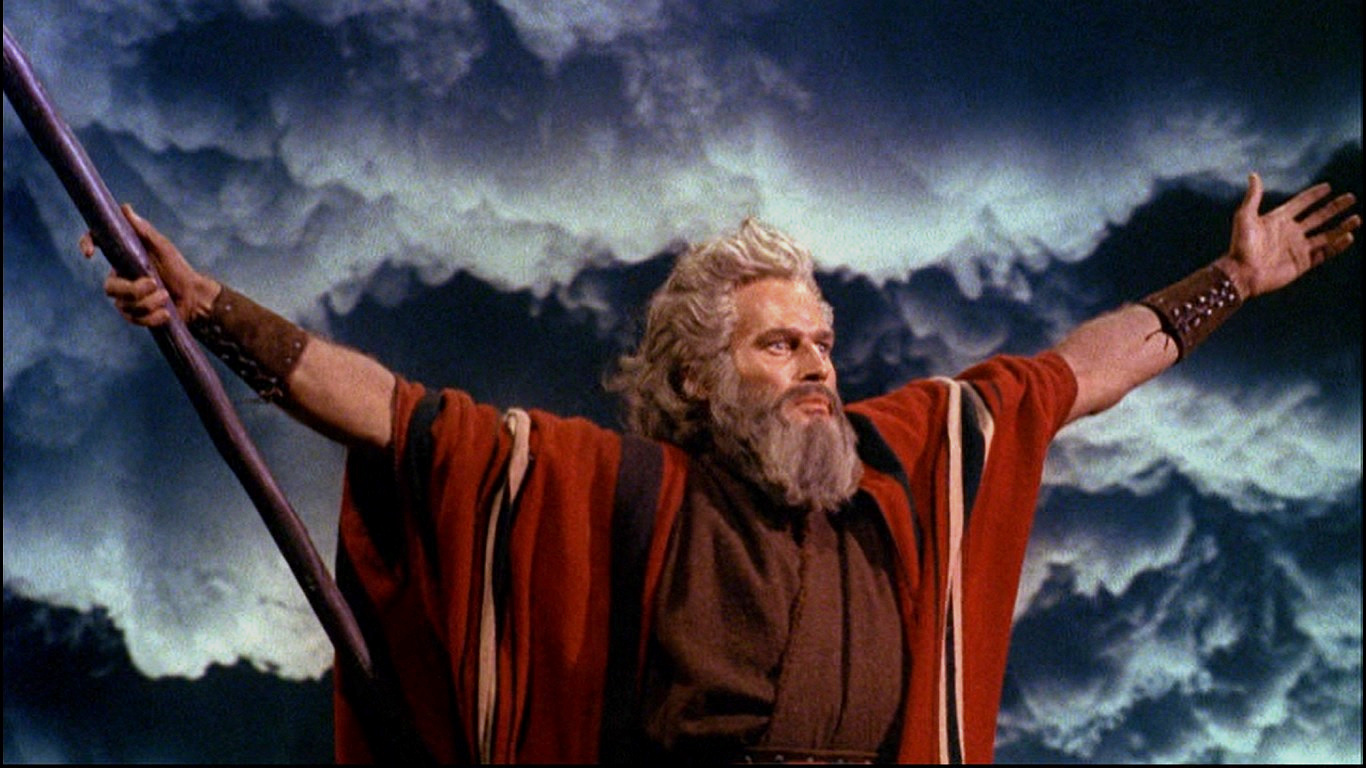
Charlton Heston in The Ten Commandments, 1956

- The first film about Moses was "Moses in the Bullrushes" in 1903 by the Gaumont Studio in France.
- Moses was portrayed by Theodore Roberts in Cecil B. DeMille's 1923 silent film The Ten Commandments. Moses also appeared as the central character in the 1956 remake, also directed by DeMille and called The Ten Commandments, in which he was portrayed by Charlton Heston, who had a noted resemblance to Michelangelo's statue. A television remake was produced in 2006.
- Burt Lancaster played Moses in the 1975 television miniseries Moses the Lawgiver.
- In the 1981 comedy film History of the World, Part I, Moses was portrayed by Mel Brooks.
- In 1995, Sir Ben Kingsley portrayed Moses in the 1995 TV film Moses, produced by British and Italian production companies.
- Moses appeared as the central character in the 1998 DreamWorks Pictures animated film The Prince of Egypt. His speaking voice was provided by Val Kilmer, with American gospel singer and tenor Amick Byram providing his singing voice.
- Ben Kingsley was the narrator of the 2007 animated film The Ten Commandments.
- In the 2009 miniseries Battles BC, Moses was portrayed by Cazzey Louis Cereghino.
- In the 2013 television miniseries The Bible, Moses was portrayed by William Houston.
- Christian Bale portrayed Moses in Ridley Scott's 2014 film Exodus: Gods and Kings which portrayed Moses and Rameses II as being raised by Seti I as cousins.
- The 2016 Brazilian Biblical telenovela Os Dez Mandamentos features Brazilian actor Guilherme Winter portraying Moses.

== See also ==
- Sixth and Seventh Books of Moses
- Table of prophets of Abrahamic religions
- Tharbis, according to Josephus, a wife of Moses
- Jewish mythology
- Children of Moses
- Slavery in ancient Egypt
- Amenmesse

== Notes ==
Moses Levite
New title	Lawgiver	Succeeded by Joshua
