= Trai Byers =

American actor (born 1983)

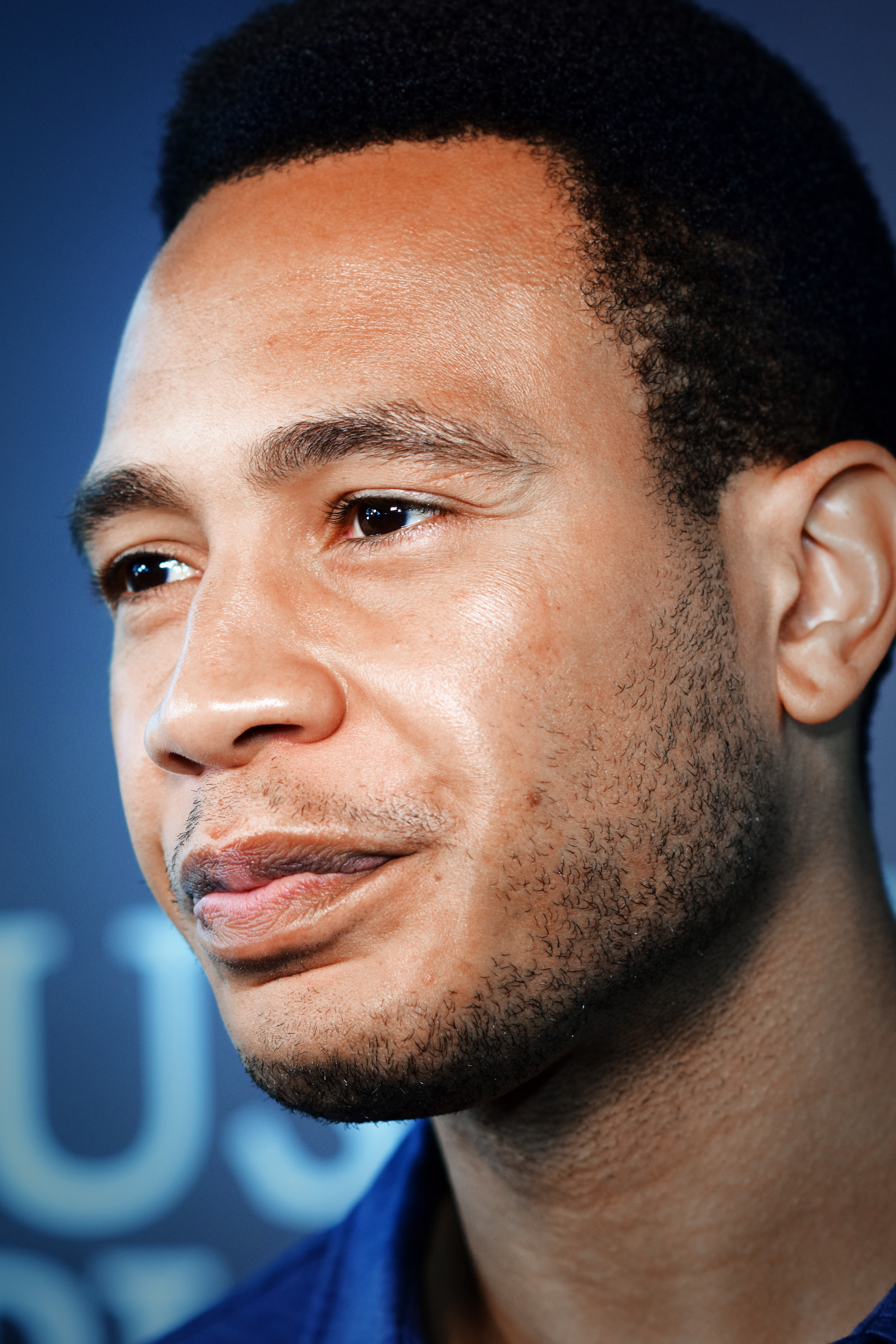
- Byers in 2022
- Born: July 19, 1983 (age 42); Kansas City, Kansas, U.S.
- Education: Andrew College (AA); University of Kansas (BA); Yale University (MFA)
- Occupations: Actor, writer
- Years active: 2009–present
- Spouse: Grace Gealey (m. 2016)
- Children: 1

Trai Byers (born July 19, 1983) is an American actor. He is best known for playing Andre Lyon in the Fox musical television series, Empire (2015–2020). In 2020, Byers co-wrote and starred in the historical drama film, The 24th.

== Early life ==
Trai Byers was born in Kansas City, Kansas. After a year of high school in Kansas City, he completed his high-school education in Georgia. Byers then graduated from Andrew College with an Associate of Arts in theatre. He then earned a Bachelor of Arts in communications from the University of Kansas. Byers also attended the American Musical and Dramatic Academy in Los Angeles, and the Yale School of Drama, where he obtained his Master of Fine Arts.

== Career ==
Byers made his screen debut in the 2009 comedy-horror film, Caesar and Otto's Summer Camp Massacre. In 2011, Byers had a recurring role on the ABC daytime soap opera, All My Children, and the following year had a role in The CW teen soap, 90210. He starred in two films directed by Kevin Willmott: Destination Planet Negro (2013) and Jayhawkers (2014). In 2014, he played civil rights activist James Forman in the historical epic film, Selma directed by Ava DuVernay.

From 2015 to 2020, Byers starred as Andre Lyon in Fox music-industry primetime soap opera, Empire. For this role, he received two NAACP Image Award for Outstanding Supporting Actor in a Drama Series nominations. In 2020, he played the leading role and co-wrote screenplay for the historical drama film, The 24th. The film received generally positive reviews from critics. In 2022, Byers made his Broadway debut in the play The Piano Lesson by August Wilson. In 2023 he guest-starred in the Grace Byers' comedy series, Harlem during the show' second season.

== Personal life ==
During the October 7, 2015, episode of the daytime talk show, FABLife, Byers's costar Grace Gealey confirmed that they were engaged. He and Gealey married on Grand Cayman Island on April 14, 2016. On their wedding anniversary in 2023, Gealey gave birth to their son.

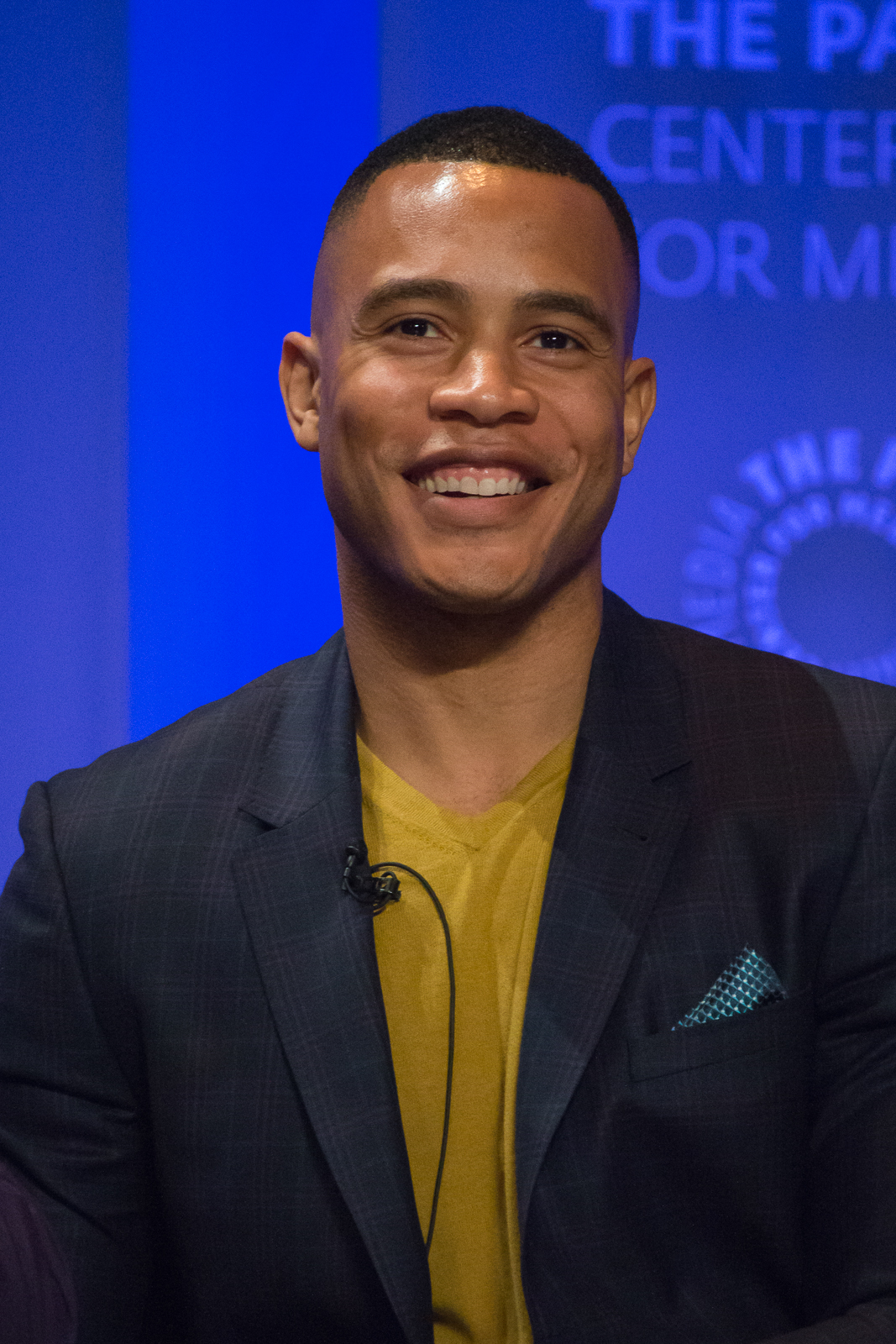
Byers in 2016

== Filmography ==
=== Film ===
Year	Title	Role	Notes
2009	Caesar and Otto's Summer Camp Massacre	Chip	
2013	Destination Planet Negro	B-12	
2014	Jayhawkers	Nathan Davis	
2014	Selma	James Forman	
2017	Americons	Theo Jones	
2018	Bent	Chuck	
2020	The 24th	Boston	Also co-writer and producer

=== Television ===
Year	Title	Role	Notes
2011	All My Children	Mookie	11 episodes
2012	90210	Alec Martin	6 episodes
2015–2020	Empire	Andre Lyon	102 episodes
2023	Harlem	Keith	2 episodes

== Awards and nominations ==
Year	Award	Category	Nominated work	Result
2015	17th Teen Choice Awards	Choice TV: Scene Stealer	Empire	Nominated
2015	17th Teen Choice Awards	Choice TV: Chemistry (shared with the others)	Empire	Nominated
2017	48th NAACP Image Awards	Outstanding Supporting Actor in a Drama Series	Empire	Nominated
2017	1st Black Reel Awards for Television	Outstanding Supporting Actor, Drama Series	Empire	Nominated
2018	49th NAACP Image Awards	Outstanding Supporting Actor in a Drama Series	Empire	Nominated
