= Flash Before the Bang =

- Directed by: Jevon Whetter
- Screenplay by: Jevon Whetter
- Story by: Jevon Whetter
- Produced by: Delbert Whetter; John D. Eraklis; Mary Aloe; Yale Badik; Tiffany FitzHenry; Hal Lieberman; Jevon Whetter
- Starring: Russell Harvard; Daniel Durant; Grace Byers; Alaqua Cox; Cazzey Louis Cereghino
- Production companies: Exodus Film Group; Aloe Entertainment; FitzHenry Films; TruJuLo Productions; Lady Spitfire; Inside Track; Artists Equity
- Country: United States
- Language: English

Flash Before the Bang is an upcoming American sports drama film written and directed by Jevon Whetter about a deaf track and field team from Oregon in the 1980s. The film stars Russell Harvard, Daniel Durant, Grace Byers and Alaqua Cox.

== Synopsis ==
Inspired by a true story of an all-deaf high school track and field team in Oregon, preparing for the 1986 Oregon State Track and Field Championship.

== Cast ==
- Russell Harvard
- Daniel Durant
- Grace Byers
- Alaqua Cox
- Cazzey Louis Cereghino

== Production ==
=== Development ===
The film from writer/director Jevon Whetter is a telling of his true experience from the 1986 Oregon State Championship, and was revealed in 2021 with Troy Kotsur, Nyle DiMarco and Deanne Bray initially attached to star, with production from Pearl Street Films and Exodus Film Group and Matt Damon and Ben Affleck as executive producers.

In May 2023, the film moved forward with John D. Eraklis from Exodus Film Group, Mary Aloe of Aloe Entertainment, and Tiffany FitzHenry of FitzHenry Films as producers alongside Delbert Whetter. Executive producers include Fanshen Cox in association with Trujulo Productions. Jessica Alba is also an executive producer through Lady Spitfire.

The cast includes Russell Harvard, Daniel Durant, Alaqua Cox and Grace Byers with eight deaf actors playing the roles of athletes on the track and field team, who are all first-time actors.

=== Filming ===
Principal photography was scheduled for Oregon and Washington, with an appeal made for deaf and hard of hearing people available to work as extras. Filming locations include Cascade High School in Turner and Kennedy High School in Mt. Angel, in Salem, Oregon in July 2024.
