= Ramose =

Ancient Egyptian name

ra Z1 ms
Ramose
in hieroglyphs
Era: New Kingdom
(1550–1069 BC)

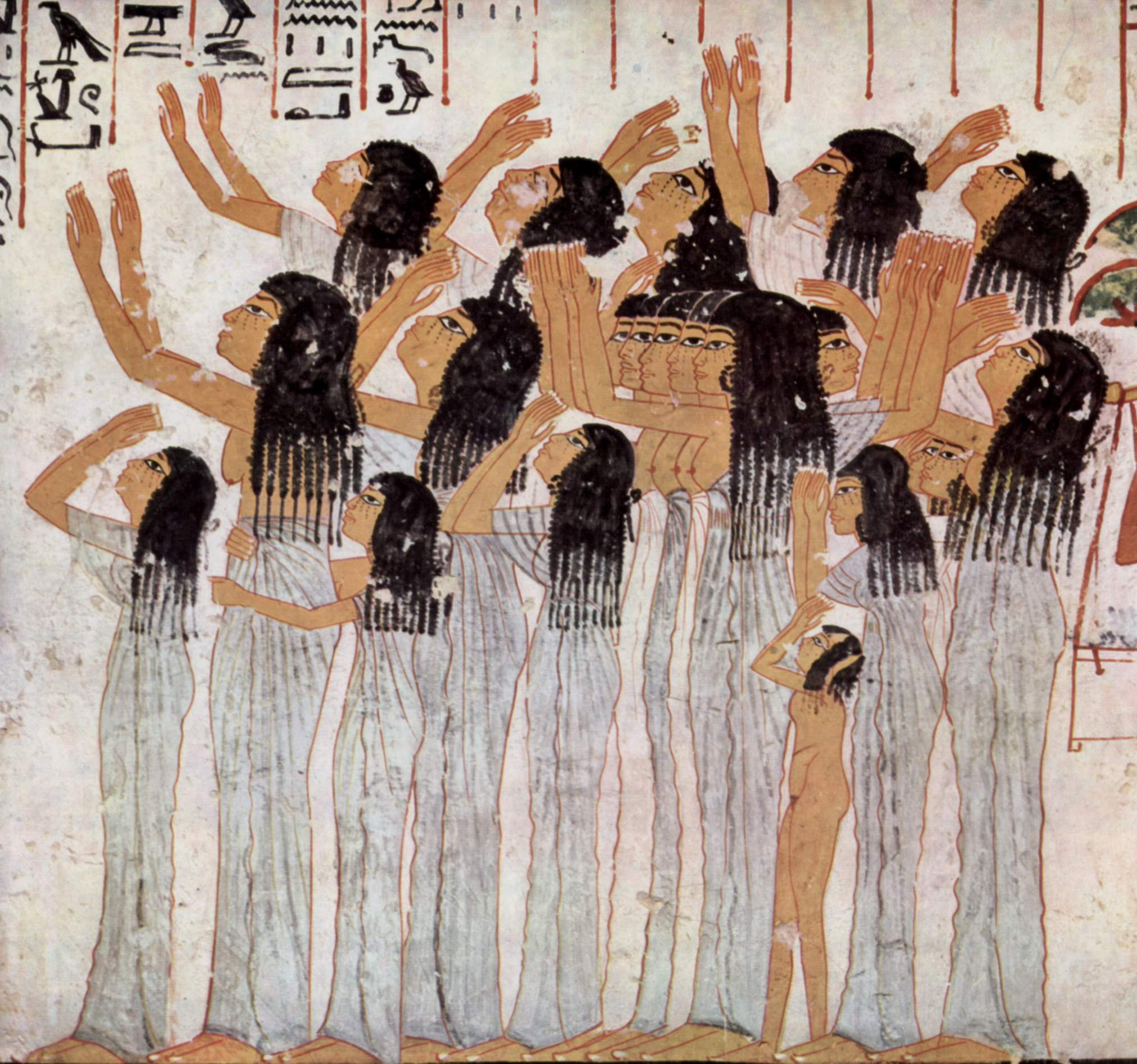
Lamenting Women, from the tomb (TT55) of Ramose, c. 1411–1375 BCE

Ramose (Egyptian: rꜥ-ms(.w)) was an ancient Egyptian name, meaning "Ra is born". Variants of the name include Ramesses (Ramessu) and Paramessu; these various spellings could be used to refer to the same person.

Notable bearers of the name include:

- Ramose, a son of Ahmose I
- Ramose, the father of Senenmut, Hatshepsut's highest state official
- Ramose, Amenhotep III's vizier (TT55)
- Ramose, a general from Amarna (Tombs of the Nobles (Amarna))
- Ramose, a general from the end of the 18th Dynasty, buried at Saqqara
- Ramose, a scribe and artisan who lived during the reigns of Ramesses II
