= Robert Moresco =

American producer

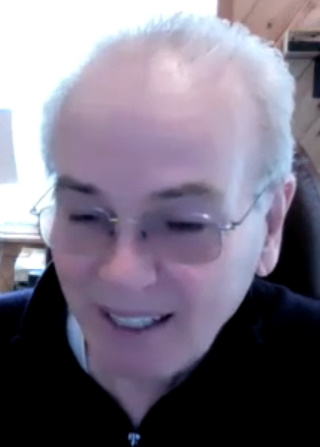
- Moresco in 2022
- Born: April 30, 1951 (age 75); New York City, U.S.
- Occupations: Producer; screenwriter; director; actor
- Years active: 1979–present

Robert "Bobby" Moresco is an American producer, screenwriter, director and actor. His credits include the films Crash, 10th & Wolf and Bent. Moresco's script for Crash won the Academy Award for Best Original Screenplay, which he shared with co-writer Paul Haggis. He was also a co-producer of Crash and has acted in three films and also made guest appearances in shows such as The Equalizer, Miami Vice, and Law & Order. He has written scripts for the television series EZ Streets, Millennium, and The Black Donnellys.

In 2012, Moresco received the Pioneer in Screenwriting Award at the Burbank International Film Festival.
