= Ramesses (Egyptian name) =

Ramesses (/ræˈmɛsiːz/ or /ˈræməsiːz/), also commonly spelled Rameses or Ramses (/ˈræməsɛs/, /ˈræmsɛs/, or /ˈræmsiːz/), is the name conventionally given in English transliteration to 11 Egyptian pharaohs of the later New Kingdom period. Other variants of the name include Ramose and Paramessu; these various spellings could be used to refer to the same person.

The various forms are based on the Greek (Ραμεσσυς: Ramessus), Latin (Ramesses), or Hebrew (רעמסס: Raˁamses, Raˁmeses) forms of the name, all ultimately based on the Ancient Egyptian form: rˁ-ms-sw (𓅭𓇳) "Ra [is] the one who gave birth [to] him".

The name (רעמסס: Raˁamses, Raˁmeses) occurs in the Hebrew Bible, not as the name of a king but rather the name of one of the two cities which was built for the Pharaoh of the oppression by the forced labor of the Israelites (Exodus, 1:11), the other such city being Pithom. Thus, the name was known to Jews and Christians long before the advent of modern Egyptology. The city is now commonly identified as Pi-Ramesses (House of Ramesses), the new capital founded by Ramesses II.

The convention of numbering kings who had the same name did not exist in Ancient Egypt, the numbers of the various pharaohs called Rameses were provided by modern scholars.

19th Dynasty

- Ramesses I: founder of the 19th Dynasty
- Ramesses II ("the Great")
- Prince Ramesses (prince), second son of Ramesses II
- Prince Ramesses-Meryamun-Nebweben, a son of Ramesses II

20th Dynasty

- Ramesses III: adversary of the Sea Peoples
- Ramesses IV
- Ramesses V
- Ramesses VI
- Ramesses VII
- Ramesses VIII
- Ramesses IX
- Ramesses X
- Ramesses XI

== See also ==
- Ramsés
