= Grace Byers =

American actress

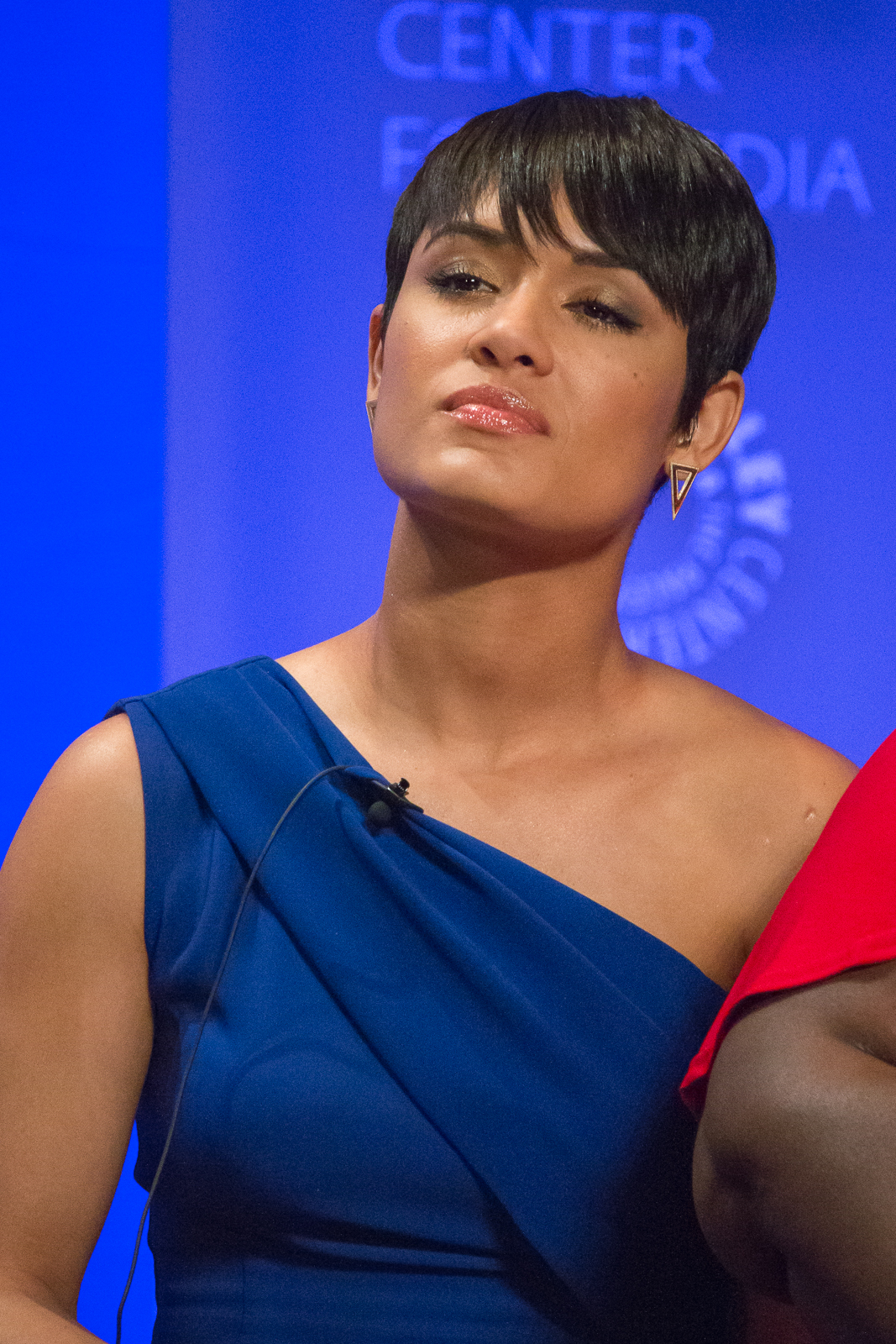
- Byers in 2016
- Born: Grace Gealey; Butler, Pennsylvania, U.S.
- Education: University of South Florida (BA); University of California, Irvine (MFA)
- Occupation: Actress
- Years active: 2012–present
- Spouse: Trai Byers (m. 2016)
- Children: 1

Grace Byers (née Gealey) is a Caymanian-American actress. She starred as Anika Calhoun in the Fox music-industry drama series, Empire from 2015 to 2018. In 2021, she began starring as Quinn Joseph in the Amazon Prime Video comedy series, Harlem. In 2022, Byers played a leading role in the comedy horror film, The Blackening.

== Early life ==
Grace was born in Butler, Pennsylvania to Caymanian parents, who moved the family back to the Cayman Islands when she was two. Her parents are deaf, so she communicates with them using sign language. After moving back to the United States at age 18, she received her bachelor's degree in Theater Arts at the University of South Florida in Tampa. Grace later attended the University of California, Irvine, where she received her Master’s of Fine Arts in acting.

== Career ==
Byers then moved to New York City, where she performed Off-Broadway, including in Venus Flytrap: A Femme Noir Mystery, and Rent. In 2013, she performed in the Chicago productions of The Misanthrope and Tartuffe. In 2014, Gealey was cast as Anika Calhoun in the Fox musical prime time drama, Empire opposite Terrence Howard and Taraji P. Henson. The series debuted on January 7, 2015. She left the series after four seasons in 2018.

In 2017, Byers was cast as Kate, a jazz singer and lounge owner, in the indie thriller Bent, making her big screen debut. In 2018, Byers published a children's book titled I Am Enough, based on her experiences being bullied as a child for having deaf parents. She wrote it to empower children to love and accept themselves.

From 2018 to 2019, Byers starred as Reeva Payge in the Fox superhero series The Gifted. In 2021, she began starring as Quinn Joseph in the Amazon comedy series, Harlem. The following year, she starred in the comedy horror film, The Blackening.

== Personal life ==
Byers became engaged to her Empire costar Trai Byers in 2015. She and Byers married on Grand Cayman, Cayman Islands on April 14, 2016. Their son was born in 2023.

== Filmography ==
=== Film ===
Year	Title	Role	Notes	Ref.
2018	Bent	Kate		
2022	The Blackening	Allison		
2023	The Retirement Plan	Hector		
TBA	Flash Before the Bang		Filming	

=== Television ===
Year	Title	Role	Notes	Ref.
2015–2018	Empire	Anika Calhoun	Series regular, 66 episodes	
2018–2019	The Gifted	Reeva Payge	Series regular; 16 episodes	
2019	Tales	Edie	Episode:"My Life"	
2021–2025	Harlem	Quinn Joseph	Series regular	
2023	Phoenix	Katherine 'Boz' Bosworth	Series regular	

== Bibliography ==
- I Believe I Can (2020) 9780062667137
- I Am Enough (2018) 9780062667120
