= Cazzey Louis Cereghino =

American actor, writer, singer (born 1979)

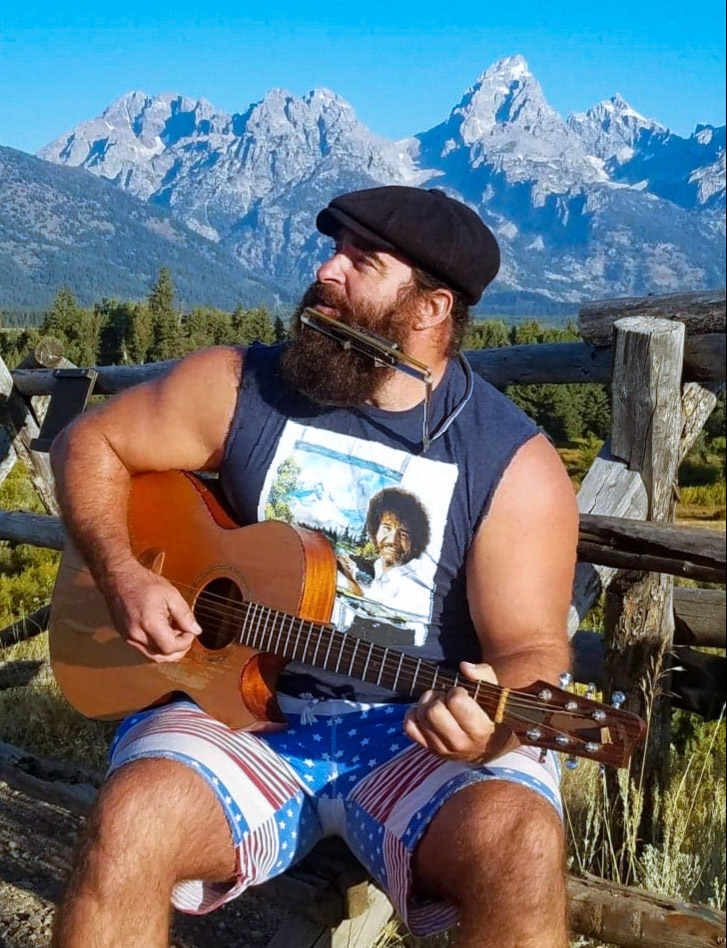
- Cereghino in 2018
- Born: April 24, 1979 (age 46); Milwaukie, Oregon, U.S.
- Occupation(s): Actor; Novelist; Stuntman; Singer; Songwriter

Cazzey Louis Cereghino is an American actor, novelist, stuntman, and singer-songwriter. Besides being recognized as one of the "What's in Your Wallet?" Capital One Vikings, he has also appeared in more Super Bowl commercials for more different companies than anyone else in history. In 2013, he was part of the team that won the Doritos "Crash the Super Bowl" contest, when he appeared wearing a wedding dress. Outside of hundreds of commercials, notable characters on TV and in feature films include Harold "Big" Johnson on Grimm, Tiny on It's Always Sunny in Philadelphia, Moses on Battles BC, Joseph of Nazareth in XL, The Temptation of Christ, and as pro wrestler Bruiser Brody in the biopic film, The Iron Claw, about the famed Von Erich wrestling family. He has also made appearances on children's shows such shows as Nickelodeon's Henry Danger and Disney's Just Roll with It. Other appearances include roles on Jimmy Kimmel Live, Shameless, TNT's Animal Kingdom, Days of Our Lives, Seal Team, The Orville and the television series Lethal Weapon.

== Early life ==
Cereghino was born in Milwaukie, Oregon, on April 24, 1979, where his family has run a farm since 1908. His father, Robert "Bobby" Cereghino, was a farmer and a home builder, and his mother Nancy is an elementary and special education teacher. Early on he was interested in US history, garnering the attention of the state newspaper, which came and interviewed him as a youngster when he continued to come to school dressed as United States Presidents. This led to him successfully running for class president and then school president. He graduated from high school as a multi-sport athlete, playing football and baseball, wrestling, and setting a school record in the mile run while running track and cross country. After graduation, he briefly lived in Nashville to start a singing and songwriting career before moving to Los Angeles in 2000. His first movie role was in the 1995 film Mr. Holland's Opus, where he was included in the graduation scene because he had the proper shoes on for the period piece. His football experience would later aid him in his performance as one of the stunt doubles doing tackles in The Longest Yard.

== Writing career ==
Cereghino has published several screenplays, twelve novels, and a non-fiction collection of short stories. In 2015, his novel 116* Days With Dad was published by Black Hill Press. The novel is loosely based on his experience as a commercial fisherman on an Alaskan fishing vessel. Recalling the experience, Cereghino said, "I went to Alaska, and it turned into a great story. At first, I thought it was the worst job in the world. You have no time off, and you spend 18 to 22 hours a day waist deep in fish blood and guts. Then when you get on shore there are all these bears, and you stink like fish." Later in 2015, his novel Kiki's Angel was published by CreateSpace. An earlier publication of Cereghino's eleventh novel, A Time To Lie, has been his best seller to date.

He has been a contributing author to the Chicken Soup for the Soul book series since 2004. His work appeared in Chicken Soup for the Teenage Soul IV, and his story Christmas Cheer was rated as one of the top 101 Chicken Soup for the Soul stories of all time.

== Songwriting and acting careers ==
Cereghino plays nine instruments and has penned hundreds of songs. Singing has allowed him to travel most of the world, performing in gigs on every continent, near or at the North and South Pole, and at dozens of countries around the world. He often appears as a musical guest on Kato Kaelin's show.

He once broke his foot while doing a stunt on the show Operation Repo but continued to film the remainder of the episode. The scene ended up being made into the opening credits for the show and could be seen at the start of every episode. He appeared in Justin Timberlake's music video Can't Stop the Feeling, where he plays the dancing mechanic. This was not Cereghino's first professional dancing gig, as he had been hired to dance for a series of commercials to promote the National Pumpkin Chucking competition some years earlier.
