= Battles BC =

- Genre: Documentary
- Directed by: David Padrusch
- Country of origin: United States
- Original language: English
- No. of seasons: 1
- No. of episodes: 8

Production
- Executive producer: Gabriel Gornell
- Running time: 60 minutes

Original release
- Release: March 9 – May 1, 2009

Battles BC is a 2009 documentary series looking at key battles in ancient history. The show was known for its very gritty nature, visual effects similar to the film 300 and its highly choreographed fight scenes with various weapons

== Production ==
The eight episode series was created and produced by Four In Hand Entertainment Group for the History Channel led by Executive Producers Gabriel Gornell and David Padrusch. Title graphics, Motion design and graphics were produced by the team at Motive NYC led by creative director Chris Valentino for the History Channel marketing and programming departments.

== Episode list ==
=== "Hannibal: The Annihilator" ===
Original Airdate: 3/09/2009

This episode follows the career of Hannibal. It focuses on his hatred of Rome and his three dramatic victories at Trebia, Trasimene, and Cannae.

=== "David: Giant Slayer" ===
Original Airdate: 3/16/2009

This episode follows the story of the Jewish King David's rise from obscurity to greatness. "Giant Slayer" is not only a reference to Goliath, but also to the great odds David faced throughout his life. It uses the Bible as a main source of material.

=== "Joshua: Epic Slaughter" ===
Original Airdate: 3/23/2009

This episode follows the story of the Joshua as he leads the Israelite people back to the Promised Land. It tells of the sieges and subsequent massacres at Ai and Jericho. It also gives a theoretical explanation for the destruction of the Walls of Jericho.

=== "Caesar: Super Siege" ===
Original Airdate: 3/30/2009

This episode focuses on the Battle of Alesia. It describes the famous double-sided fortifications created by Julius Caesar that besieged Vercingetorix's forces on one side and protected Caesar's flanks from reinforcements.

=== "Moses: Death Chase" ===
Original Airdate: 4/13/2009

This episode follows the story of the Moses leading the Israelites out of Egypt. The episode describes the Israelites not as slaves, but as a warrior class within Egypt. It uses the Bible and historical documents as a main source of material.

=== "Alexander: Lord of War" ===
Original Airdate: 4/19/2009

This episode focuses on the Indian campaigns of Alexander the Great. It goes into great detail of Battle of the Hydaspes.

=== "Ramses: Raging Chariots" ===
Original Airdate: 4/26/2009

This episode focuses on the clash between Egyptian Pharaoh Ramesses II and the Hittite Emperor Muwatalli II at the Battle of Kadesh.

=== "Judgment Day at Marathon" ===
Original Airdate: 5/01/2009

This episode focuses on the Battle of Marathon, the ill-fated invasion of Greece by Persian king Darius I.
