= Ramose (18th Dynasty) =

Ancient egyptian general

- Buried: Saqqara
- Allegiance: 18th Dynasty of Egypt (Horemheb)
- Rank: General, scribe of the army

Ramose was an ancient Egyptian general, mainly known from his tomb excavated at Saqqara. Ramose appears in the inscriptions of his tomb with several titles, including Generals of the army (ḥry-pḏt n p3 mš3), General of the Lord of the Two Lands, deputy of the army (idnw n p3 mš3) and priest Ramose lived at the end of the 18th Dynasty and started his career most likely under general Horemheb (before the latter became king).

The tomb of Ramose consists of the underground burial chambers and the overground chapel. The chapel is mudbrick-built and has two courtyards. The entrance is on the east side. At the very back there are three chapels.

The tomb of Ramose lies directly next to the one of Horemheb, that he built when he was general and not yet king. In the tomb of Horemheb appears also a close servant of Horemhab with the title scribe of the army and the name Ramose. It seems likely that these two people with the name Ramose are identical. Not much more is known about him. His tomb was found heavily looted, but it seems that he was buried there as there were found shabtis with his name. On the shabtis he bears the title priest.

Before the tomb of Ramose was found, there were some speculations about the Ramose depicted in the tomb of Horemheb. The successor of Horemheb as king was Ramesses I and there were some discussions that Ramose later became king Ramesses I. With the discovery of his private tomb, this seems now unlikely.
