= Bent (2018 film) =

- Directed by: Robert Moresco
- Written by: Robert Moresco
- Based on: Deadly Codes by JP O'Donnell
- Produced by: Monika Bacardi; Alberto Burgueño; Andrea Iervolino; Danielle Maloni; JP O'Donnell
- Starring: Karl Urban; Sofía Vergara; Andy García
- Cinematography: Gian Filippo Corticelli
- Edited by: Martin Bernfeld; Matthew Rundell
- Music by: Zacarías M. de la Riva
- Production companies: Grindstone Entertainment Group; AMBI Media Group; Lionsgate
- Distributed by: Lionsgate Premiere
- Release date: 9 March 2018
- Running time: 96 minutes
- Country: United States
- Language: English
- Box office: $82,247

Bent is a 2018 American crime thriller film directed and written by Robert Moresco, based on a 2009 book Deadly Codes by JP O'Donnell, starring Karl Urban, Sofía Vergara and Andy García.

== Plot ==
Bent follows Danny Gallagher (Karl Urban), a discredited narcotics detective who, upon his release from prison, makes plans to seek revenge on the accuser who framed him and killed his partner. Through his quest, Gallagher is forced to confront a ruthless, seductive government agent Rebecca (Sofía Vergara), who may or may not be on his side; and his mentor Jimmy Murtha (Andy García), a retired cop who has fought corruption his entire career.

== Cast ==
- Karl Urban as Danny Gallagher
- Sofía Vergara as Rebecca
- Andy García as Jimmy Murtha
- Grace Byers as Kate
- Vincent Spano as Charlie Horvath
- Tonya Cornelisse as Helen
- John Finn as Driscoll

== Reception ==
Bent has grossed $82,247 in worldwide theatrical box office, and sales of its DVD/Blu-ray releases have cashed $345,868.
