= Light as a Feather (disambiguation) =

Light as a Feather is a 1973 album by Return to Forever.

Light as a Feather may also refer to:

- Light as a Feather, 1979 album by Azymuth
- Light as a Feather (TV series), an American TV series that premiered in 2018
- "Light as a Feather", a song by Chromatics from the album Closer to Grey

== See also ==
- Light as a feather, stiff as a board, a children's levitation trick
