= Black Mafia Family =

American criminal organization

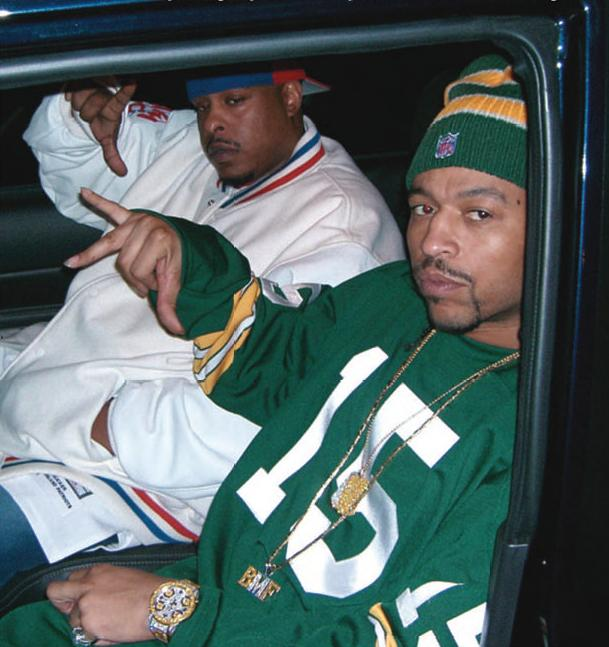
- Demetrius "Big Meech" Flenory (right, in green) and Chad "J-Bo" Brown
- Founded: Late 1985; "BMF" acronym started to be used around 2000
- Founding location: Detroit, Michigan, U.S.
- Years active: 1985–2005
- Territory: States: Georgia, Alabama, Illinois, Louisiana, Michigan, Mississippi, Texas, Ohio
- Membership: Over 500
- Activities: Drug trafficking, money laundering
- Allies: Folk Nation (Gangster Disciples, Black Disciples, Black Gangsters, Insane Spanish Cobras, Maniac Latin Disciples, Imperial Gangsters, Gangster Sin City Boys, Simon City Royals, etc), Crips, Zoe Pound, etc.

The Black Mafia Family (BMF) was a drug trafficking and money laundering organization in the United States. It was founded in 1985, in Southwest Detroit, by brothers Demetrius Edward "Big Meech" and Terry Lee "Southwest Tee" Flenory. By 2000, it had established cocaine distribution sales throughout the United States through its Los Angeles–based drug source and direct links to Mexican drug cartels. The Black Mafia Family operated from two main hubs: one in Atlanta for distribution, run by Demetrius Flenory; and one in Los Angeles to handle incoming shipments from Mexico, run by Terry Flenory.

The Black Mafia Family under Demetrius Flenory entered the hip-hop music business as BMF Entertainment in the early 2000s as a front organization to launder money from cocaine sales and to legitimize itself. BMF Entertainment served as a promoter for several high-profile hip-hop artists, and as a record label for their sole artist Bleu DaVinci. Demetrius Flenory and the Black Mafia Family became famous in hip-hop culture for their highly extravagant lifestyles.

In 2005, the Drug Enforcement Administration (DEA) indicted members of the Black Mafia Family, ultimately securing convictions by targeting the Flenory brothers under the Continuing Criminal Enterprise Statute, and both were sentenced to 30 years imprisonment. Prosecutors alleged the Black Mafia Family made over $270 million in the course of their operations.

== Flenory brothers ==
Demetrius Edward "Big Meech" Flenory Sr. (born June 21, 1968, in Detroit, Michigan) and his brother Terry Lee "Southwest Tee" Flenory, Sr. (born January 10, 1970, in Detroit, Michigan) were selling $50 bags of cocaine on the streets of Detroit during their high school years in the late 1980s. As such, their original group was known as "50 Boyz". By 2000, the Flenory brothers had established a large organization overseeing multi-kilogram cocaine distribution sales in numerous U.S. states, including Alabama, California, Florida, Georgia, Kentucky, Louisiana, Michigan, Mississippi, Missouri, North Carolina, Ohio, and Tennessee. A two-year federal investigation of the Flenory organization estimated its nationwide membership at over 500.

Around 2003, the organization experienced a schism when the Flenory brothers began to feud, with Terry Flenory moving to Los Angeles to head his own organization, while Demetrius Flenory remained at the main distribution center in Atlanta. By 2003, the two had been involved in a major falling out and rarely spoke to one another. In a conversation with his brothers caught by the DEA on wiretap, Terry discussed his worries that his brother Demetrius was bringing the wrong type of attention to their business with his excessive partying. By the time charges were filed against the Flenorys, the government had 900 pages of typed transcripts of wiretapped conversations from Terry's phone in a five-month period.

In November 2007, the brothers pleaded guilty to running a continuing criminal enterprise. In September 2008, both brothers were sentenced to 30 years in prison for running a nationwide cocaine-trafficking ring, which lasted from 2000 to 2005. Demetrius Flenory served out his sentence at Federal Correctional Institution, Sheridan, and was released on October 16, 2024. Terry Flenory was released to home confinement on May 5, 2020, after being granted a compassionate release due to health ailments and an effort from the Federal Bureau of Prisons to release certain inmates in order to limit the spread of the COVID-19 pandemic within federal prisons. Demetrius Flenory also sought his release under the same guidelines; however, a federal judge rejected the move, claiming it would be premature to authorize his release, as his prison record suggests he has not changed and continues to promote himself as a drug kingpin, further stating his disciplinary record includes violations such as possession of a cell phone and weapons as well as drug use.

== BMF Entertainment ==
In the 2000s, Demetrius Flenory established BMF Entertainment as a promotion agency and record label for hip-hop music. The Flenory brothers were already known to associate with numerous high-profile hip-hop artists including Sean Combs, Trina, T.I., Jay-Z, Young Jeezy and Fabolous. Demetrius founded BMF Entertainment as a front organization for money laundering the cash generated by the cocaine distribution network but was also an attempt to create a legitimate business and legal source of income. Around this time, the Flenory organization formally adopted the name "Black Mafia Family" after previously being unnamed.

In 2005, Bleu DaVinci's album, World Is BMF's, was nominated for a Source Award. BMF appeared in numerous underground hip-hop DVD magazines, most notably several issues of S.M.A.C.K. and The Come Up. The organization's most highly visible appearance was in a full-length DVD produced by The Raw Report, which gave a detailed inside look at their movement. The DVD was featured in Vibe's cover article on BMF in May 2006. It received wide acclaim from DJs for the Soundsmith Productions produced song "Streets on Lock", headed by BMF affiliate Bleu DaVinci and featuring Fabolous and Young Jeezy. A music video was later produced for the single, though it was never released to networks.

Creative Loafing senior editor Mara Shalhoup wrote a three-part series about the Black Mafia Family entitled Hip-Hop's Shadowy Empire, which was the first in-depth report on the organization. Shalhoup's book on the organization, BMF: The Rise and Fall of Big Meech and the Black Mafia Family, was published in March 2005.

== Investigation ==
=== Operation Motor City Mafia ===
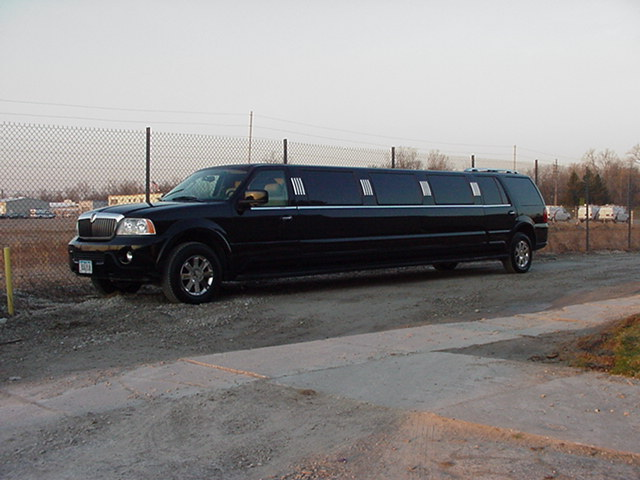
Lincoln Navigator stretch limo owned by BMF used to transport money and cocaine.

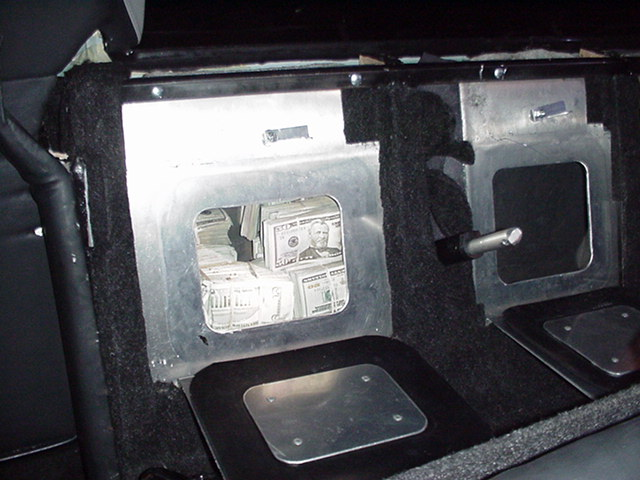
Hidden compartments inside the Lincoln limousine used to transport cocaine and money.

Police investigation into the Black Mafia began sometime in the early 1990s, before the organization operated by Demetrius and Terry Flenory was named or reached peak distribution. The lead-up to the October 2005 indictments began with a series of large drug seizures and subsequent informant testimonies from BMF members. On October 28, 2003, a two-year Organized Crime Drug Enforcement Task Force investigation began, coordinated by the DEA's Special Operations Division and codenamed "Operation Motor City Mafia".

On April 11, 2004, BMF courier and high-level distributor Jabari Hayes was pulled over in Phelps County, Missouri along I-44 driving a 40-foot motor home, supposedly for swerving over the fog line. Two suitcases containing approximately 95 kilograms of cocaine and 572 grams of marijuana were found in the back of the Range Rover after a K-9 unit alerted to drugs in the vehicle.

In mid-September 2004, a wiretap on Rafael "Smurf" Allison, a low-level crack dealer in Atlanta, led an HIDTA task force to Decarlo Hoskins, a mid-level dealer. Hoskins informed them that he had grown up with two brothers, Omari McCree and Jeffrey Leahr, who were BMF members and able to supply multi-kilogram quantities of cocaine regularly. Wiretaps revealed that Omari Lateef McCree, aka O Dogg, was a high-level distributor for the Flenory organization and was favored by Demetrius.

On November 5, 2004, Jeffrey Leahr was pulled over with his girlfriend on I-75 in Atlanta due to the wiretaps. In the back seat was a duffel bag containing 10 kilograms of cocaine. They were released later that day in an attempt by HIDTA to gather more information in regards to their supplier and the organization using wiretaps. McCree and Leahr, facing a large debt to BMF for the lost cocaine, went on the run. When picked up on June 8, 2005, Omari "O Dogg" McCree, signed a confidential-source agreement and described his role in BMF, naming Demetrius Flenory as the source of the cocaine. Chad "J-Bo" Brown, supplied him with cocaine on behalf of Demetrius. These events and a number of others formed the backbone of the government's case. During trial, the government's star witness was William "Doc" Marshall.

Testimony given during various trials indicated the Flenory organization operated as follows: BMF operated five stash houses in the Atlanta area. Approximately every 10 days, vehicles would arrive with 100–150 kilograms of cocaine packed in secret compartments. Workers at the stash houses were paid to unload the drugs and store them. Customers who ordered would call in and say they had their vehicle ready – meaning a transportation vehicle to put the narcotics in. Depending on the size of their order, they were directed to a particular stash house where they would pull in, go inside, and hand over money in $5,000 bundles. The cocaine was usually sold at $20,000 per kilogram. The same vehicles would then be filled with cash (the proceeds from drug sales) to be sent back to the Mexican sources of supply. Workers inside the stash houses had certain duties, such as counting bulk amounts of cash, usually in the millions. Other people were packaging the cocaine for customers. BMF also received drugs through large containers at the airport containing 100–150 kilograms of cocaine, which they picked up and delivered to stash houses.

=== 2005 raids and arrests ===
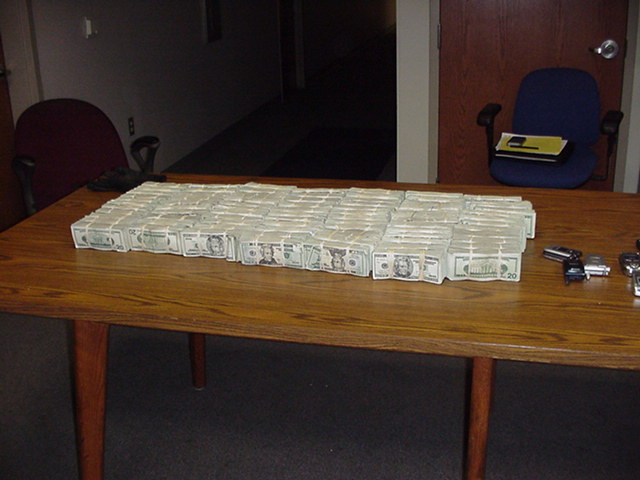
Money seized from the BMF by the Drug Enforcement Administration

In October 2005, some 30 members of BMF were arrested in a massive drug raid orchestrated by the DEA. During these raids, the DEA seized $3 million in cash and assets, 2.5 kilograms of cocaine, and numerous weapons. Prior to the October 2005 raids, the DEA had arrested 17 BMF members, seized 632 kilograms of cocaine, $5.3 million in cash, and $5.7 million in assets. They claimed BMF was responsible for moving over 2,500 kilograms of cocaine a month throughout the United States.

Demetrius Flenory and Terry Flenory were charged under the Continuing Criminal Enterprise Statute, conspiracy to distribute 5 kilograms or more of cocaine, possession with intent to distribute more than 500 grams of cocaine, conspiracy to launder monetary instruments, and two counts of possession with intent to distribute more than 5 kilograms of cocaine. Demetrius was captured in a large home in a suburb outside Dallas. Inside, police found a small amount of marijuana and a few MDMA pills. In a safe inside the house were several weapons, as well as multiple vehicles at the home. Terry was captured in St. Louis with small amounts of marijuana and weapons found throughout the house, which was also occupied by multiple people at the time of the arrest.

=== 2006 indictments ===
On June 15, 2006, the U.S. Department of Treasury reported that 16 additional individuals had been charged with conspiracy to distribute cocaine and money laundering charges under a second, superseding indictment, bringing the number of people charged in the case to 49. The list of accused included Jacob Arabo, popularly known as Jacob the Jeweler, a well-known celebrity jeweler in the hip-hop community. Arabo was charged with conspiracy to launder more than $270 million in illegally obtained funds.

The Department of Justice also shed light on more of the group's alleged activities in the indictment papers, which included running drug money through various banks and money wiring services in an attempt to disguise its origin. The group had also been accused of obtaining several winning Michigan state lottery tickets from a third party, which they paid cash for, and then cashing in the tickets in an attempt to make the money appear legitimate. The indictment sought the forfeiture of "more than 30 pieces of jewelry, 13 residences, 35 vehicles including Lincoln Limousine, BMW's, Range Rovers, Aston-Martin, and Bentleys, numerous bank accounts, over $1.2 million in seized currency, and a money judgment totaling $270 million."

=== 2007 indictments (Atlanta) ===
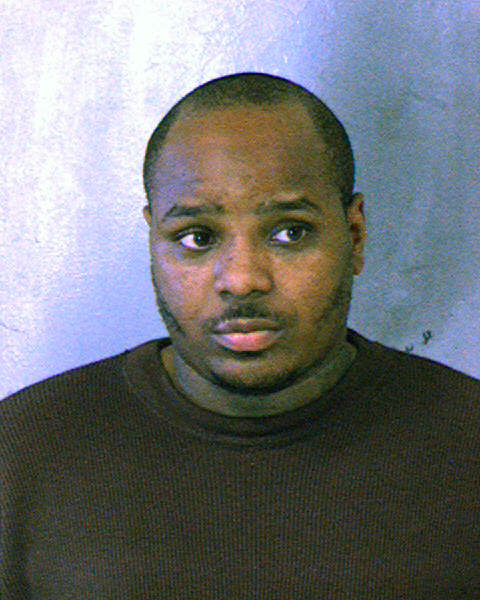
Fleming "Ill" Daniels

On July 25, 2007, United States District Court for the Northern District of Georgia unveiled an indictment of 16 more members of the Black Mafia Family with conspiracy to distribute cocaine. The indictment charged all defendants with participating in the nationwide cocaine distribution conspiracy, which carries a penalty of between 10 years and life in prison, and up to a $4 million fine. The indictments were seen as "shutting down the BMF's once-flourishing drug empire." Eventually, all defendants pleaded guilty before trial except Fleming "Ill" Daniels.

Fleming Daniels, a top member of the Black Mafia Family drug ring, was sentenced to 20 years in prison for drug trafficking on December 17, 2008. The federal judge also fined Daniels $10,000 for taking part in the violent group. Daniels was the 16th defendant indicted in Atlanta on charges stemming from their role in the organization and the only defendant in the Atlanta indictments to go to trial, with 11 others already having pleaded guilty. The government's case relied upon testimony from William "Doc" Marshall and Ralph Simms to convict Daniels. Daniels had not been caught with cocaine nor caught on wiretaps discussing drug business. The testimony from Marshall indicated that he had seen Daniels receive cocaine in the kilograms while he himself was picking up cocaine. Daniels also awaited trial for the July 2004 murder of Rashannibal Drummond. On February 26, 2010, he pleaded guilty and was sentenced to 20 years for voluntary manslaughter. His 20-year sentence will run concurrent to another 20-year sentence stemming from his role on BMF cocaine charges.

Barima "Bleu DaVinci" McKnight, the rapper and sole artist of BMF Entertainment, was sentenced on October 30, 2008, to five years and four months in federal prison. McKnight claimed Flenory presented himself as being involved in the music industry and it was not until much later that he let him into the cocaine side of the business. McKnight stated at sentencing that when he first met Demetrius Flenory, he did not show him "the other side of his world", in reference to the cocaine trafficking. McKnight was released in 2011 and returned to his music career. He and his younger brother Calico Jonez began the BMF tour. Calico Jonez, who had started Swishgang joined with McKnight to establish a BMF Swishgang. Jonez, who was known to have played a role in Soulja Boy's label SODMG, and gang ties to Long Beach California's Rolling 20s Crips began making music under the BMF Entertainment umbrella. McKnight is also a cousin of Ras Kass.

=== 2009 and after ===
The last remaining suspect, Vernon Marcus Coleman, was arrested on July 17, 2009, in Atlanta. He was indicted in 2007 for possession with intent to distribute cocaine. With this, the number of arrested BMF members rose to about 150. The federal government believes the 150 they have indicted and arrested account for the command and control structure, as well as other key figures in the organization, such as distributors, stash house operators, and transporters.

== Allegations of violence ==
Prior to Operation Motor City Mafia and shortly after its commencement, there were numerous acts of violence alleged to have been committed by BMF members:

- November 11, 2003: Demetrius Flenory was arrested in connection with the Buckhead-area shooting deaths at the now-closed Club Chaos of Anthony "Wolf" Jones, a former bodyguard of P. Diddy, and Wolf's friend, Lamont "Riz" Girdy. However, Flenory was shot in the buttocks and claimed he was running away from gunfire as the shooting occurred; he was never indicted due to lack of witnesses and evidence.
- July 25, 2004: At a Midtown Atlanta club called the Velvet Room, a man named Rashannibal "Prince" Drummond was killed. The incident began after Flemming "Ill" Daniels nearly backed into Drummond in his Porsche Cayenne Turbo. After Drummond hit the car to alert the driver, the passengers of the car got out and began beating Drummond and his friends. During the fight, a friend of Drummond's fired a warning shot to scare everyone off; Daniels allegedly retrieved his gun, returned fire, then walked over to Drummond and executed him on the ground.
- September 2004: Ulysses Hackett and his girlfriend Misty Carter were executed in her Highland Avenue apartment in Atlanta. Police say the murders were ordered by Tremayne "Kiki" Graham, then son-in-law of Shirley Franklin, the Mayor of Atlanta, and alleged associate of BMF. They claimed Ulysses was thinking of testifying against BMF and Graham, growing suspicious, ordered their murder.
- May 10, 2005: Henry "Pookie Loc" Clark was killed by popular rapper Gucci Mane during an attempted robbery committed by Clark and four other men. The five men attacked Gucci Mane in the apartment of a stripper he met earlier that day, but Gucci Mane was armed and managed to fire at the attackers, hitting Clark. The incident occurred during a feud between Gucci Mane and rapper Young Jeezy, a BMF associate. Gucci Mane was later cleared of the murder charges due to acting in self-defense, and his lawyers alleged the five men were ordered by BMF to commit the robbery.
- May 11, 2005: A fugitive named Deron Gatling was located by a regional drug task force in Chamblee, Georgia. Task force agents found Gatling behind insulation in the attic; at that moment shots were fired from outside the house at law enforcement. They traced the last number called in Gatling's phone to Jerry Davis, leader of BMF's supposed sister organization, the Sin City Mafia. Police alleged that Gatling called Davis to report the officers at his house, and Davis ordered the shots to be fired. Gatling died in prison in 2006.
- May 23, 2005: Shayne and Kelsey Brown, nephews of R&B singer Bobby Brown, were stabbed in the neck with an ice pick at a birthday party at Justin's, a restaurant in Atlanta owned by P. Diddy. Witnesses claim that Marque "Baby Bleu" Dixson, the younger brother of BMF rap artist and member Bleu DaVinci, got into an altercation with the Browns alongside bodyguards of rapper Fabolous, who was there with Dixson. During the altercation, Dixson is alleged to have stabbed both in the neck, causing permanent disfigurement. Dixson was later murdered in 2006 by his girlfriend.

== In popular culture ==
Jabari Hayes, an alleged member of the BMF who allegedly served as their courier and distributor, wrote the book Miles in the Life (2009) and is also the executive producer of a 2017 documentary by the same name. BMF: The Rise and Fall of Big Meech and the Black Mafia Family was released in 2012. The author is Mara Shalhoup, who wrote the first in-depth report on BMF for Creative Loafing in 2006.

In 2010, American rapper Rick Ross released the song "B.M.F. (Blowin' Money Fast)" with the title's acronym being in reference to the organization's name. The song's chorus also repeatedly mentions Demetrius Flenory's alias, "Big Meech".

The 2012 documentary BMF: The Rise and Fall of a Hip-Hop Drug Empire explores the 14-year investigation.

The documentary series Gangland covered the Black Mafia Family in its 87th episode.

In 2021, a drama television series called Black Mafia Family premiered on STARZ, produced by Curtis "50 Cent" Jackson. Demetrius Flenory is played by his real-life son, Demetrius "Lil Meech" Flenory Jr.

In 2025, American singer SZA, released the single "BMF", from the reissue of her sophomore studio album SOS retitled Lana, which references both Black Mafia Family and Blowin Money Fast.

== Snitching allegations ==
In 2025, American rapper Curtis "50 Cent' Jackson launched snitching allegations against Demetrius "Big Meech" Flenory Sr. This happened after Meech appeared in a video with 50 Cent's rival Rick Ross. 50 claimed Meech cooperated with federal investigations by using then federal informant "Tammy Cowins" in a third-party cooperation effort to get his jail sentence reduced by implicating other individuals involved in criminal activity. Meech appeared on social media and addressed the allegations with the following statement: "I was not going to address this, because I'm not going to let nobody trick me off the streets. I never folded, never told, never will. Death before dishonor always with me."

== See also ==
- African-American organized crime
- The Black Mafia also known as Philadelphia Black Mafia (PBM)
- List of criminal enterprises, gangs, and syndicates
