= Rickey Smiley For Real =

- Genre: Reality
- Starring: Rickey Smiley
- Country of origin: United States
- Original language: English
- No. of seasons: 5
- No. of episodes: 44

Production
- Running time: 42 minutes
- Production company: Bobbcat Films

Original release
- Network: TV One
- Release: November 10, 2015 – present

Rickey Smiley For Real is an American reality television series that premiered on November 10, 2015, on TV One. The series follows the life of comedian and radio show host Rickey Smiley as he juggles between his career, fatherhood and personal life, with the two main settings being Birmingham, Alabama (his hometown) and Atlanta, Georgia (where he hosts his syndicated radio show).

"[The show] showcases the ‘real’ Rickey," said D’Angela Proctor, the network's vice president. "We see his real job, real friends, real kids and his really crazy life. As a successful member of our Radio One family, Rickey’s return to TV One is sure to resonate with our audience." Smiley had previously starred on his own scripted series on TV One titled The Rickey Smiley Show.

In April 2016, TV One renewed the series for a second season which premiered on May 10, 2016. On August 13, 2018, TV One renewed the series for a fifth season that premiered on October 30, 2018.

== Episodes ==
=== Season 1 (2015–16) ===
No.	Title	Original release date
1	"Sweet Home Alabama"	November 10, 2015
2	"The Playmaker"	November 17, 2015
3	"Sink or Swim"	November 24, 2015
4	"Thy Will Be Done"	December 8, 2015
5	"The Scent of a Woman"	December 15, 2015
6	"Straight Outta Birmingham"	December 22, 2015
7	"The "I" in Team"	December 29, 2015
8	"Hoo Rah!"	January 5, 2016
9	"Magic is in the Air"	January 12, 2016

=== Season 2 (2016) ===
No.	Title	Original release date
1	"Wish You Were Here"	May 10, 2016
2	"The Wait"	May 17, 2016
3	"Banishing Point"	May 24, 2016
4	"Suck MC's"	May 31, 2016
5	"Juiced Up"	June 7, 2016
6	"Up, Up, and Away"	June 14, 2016
7	"Shark Tanked"	June 21, 2016
8	"Full Metal Jacket"	June 28, 2016
9	"No Competition"	July 5, 2016
10	"Grand Ole Time"	July 12, 2016
11	"Bowled Over"	July 19, 2016

=== Season 3 (2016) ===
No.	Title	Original release date
1	"Family Business"	November 15, 2016
2	"Little Women, Big Problems"	November 22, 2016
3	"Vamos a Colombia"	November 29, 2016
4	"Spirited Conversations"	December 6, 2016
5	"Animal Kingdom"	December 13, 2016
6	"Smiley Family Christmas"	December 20, 2016
7	"Busted"	January 3, 2017
8	"Rise Up!"	January 10, 2017
9	"Dissension"	January 17, 2017
10	"Turning Point"	January 24, 2017

=== Season 4 (2017) ===
No.	Title	Original release date
1	"Viva La Miami"	June 13, 2017
2	"Progression"	June 20, 2017
3	"Love Me or Leave me Alone"	June 27, 2017
4	"That's What Friends Are For"	July 11, 2017
5	"Spill The Beans"	July 18, 2017
6	"Bringing It All Together"	July 25, 2017
7	"Attention!"	August 1, 2017
8	"We Are Family"	August 8, 2017
9	"This Is a Man's World"	August 15, 2017
10	"Everyday Hustle"	August 22, 2017
11	"New Ventures"	August 29, 2017
12	"Conception"	September 5, 2017
13	"Showtime"	September 12, 2017
14	"Life Happens"	September 19, 2017
