= Da'Vinchi =

Haitian-American actor (born 1995)

- Born: Abraham D. Juste; October 10, 1995 (age 31); New York City, U.S.
- Occupation: Actor
- Years active: 2018–present

Abraham D. Juste (born October 10, 1995), known professionally as Da'Vinchi, is a Haitian-American actor. He is best known for his role as Darnell Hayes in the TV series All American, and he also appeared in eight episodes of Grown-ish between 2018 and 2019. In 2021, he started playing the character of Terry 'Southwest T' Flenory in the Starz series BMF. In 2026 he became a member of the cast of NBC's Chicago Fire, playing Firefighter Candidate Marcus Burke.

== Early life ==
Juste was born in Brooklyn, New York City.

== Career ==
He began his acting career in 2018, when he made his television debut in one episode of Marvel's Jessica Jones, playing Eric Ambrose. He had a recurring role as Cash Mooney in eight episodes of the ABC series Grown-ish. He played Darnell Hayes in 18 episodes of The CW's All American. In 2020, Da'Vinchi made his film debut in the sports drama film The Way Back as Devon Childress, which was theatrically released on March 6, 2020, by Warner Bros. Pictures.

In 2021, Da'Vinchi was cast alongside Demetrius Flenory Jr. in the crime drama series BMF, where he played Terry "Southwest T" Flenory, drug kingpin and the son of Charles & Lucille, which premiered on September 26, 2021, on Starz.

In 2023, Da'Vinchi starred with his BMF co-star Ajiona Alexus in Mary J. Blige's Real Love and Strength of a Woman, playing Ben.

== Filmography ==
=== Film ===
Year	Title	Role	Notes
2020	The Way Back	Devon Childress	
2021	The Disappearance of Mrs. Wu	Rick Larson	
2023	Real Love	Ben	Lifetime movie
2023	Strength of a Woman	Ben	Lifetime movie
2025	Family Affair	Ben	Lifetime movie
2026	Why Did I Get Married Again?	Marcus Jr.	

=== Television ===
Year	Title	Role	Notes
2018	Jessica Jones	Eric Ambrose	Episode: "AKA Facetime"; Credited as Abraham D. Juste
2018	Lethal Weapon	Dylan	Episode: "Bali"
2018–2019	Grown-ish	Cash Mooney	Recurring cast
2019	The Boys	Anthony	Episode: "The Innocents"
2019–2025	All American	Darnell Hayes	Recurring role
2020	Vegas High		Television movie
2021–2025	BMF	Terry "Southwest T" Flenory	Main cast
2026	Chicago Fire	Marcus Burke	Main cast (season 15)
