= Breaking In (2018 film) =

- Theatrical release poster
- Directed by: James McTeigue
- Screenplay by: Ryan Engle
- Story by: Jaime Primak Sullivan
- Produced by: Gabrielle Union; James Lopez; Sheila Hanahan Taylor; Craig Perry; Will Packer
- Starring: Gabrielle Union; Billy Burke; Richard Cabral; Levi Meaden; Jason George; Ajiona Alexus; Seth Carr; Christa Miller
- Cinematography: Toby Oliver
- Edited by: Joseph Jett Sally
- Music by: Johnny Klimek
- Production companies: Will Packer Productions; Practical Pictures
- Distributed by: Universal Pictures
- Release date: May 11, 2018
- Running time: 88 minutes
- Country: United States
- Language: English
- Budget: $12 million
- Box office: $51.4 million

Breaking In is a 2018 American action thriller film directed by James McTeigue and starring Gabrielle Union, who also produced the film alongside Will Packer, James Lopez, Craig Perry, and Sheila Taylor. The film follows a mother who must protect her children after the mansion of her recently deceased father is invaded by burglars.

Principal photography began in July 2017 in Southern California. The film was released in the United States on May 11, 2018. It grossed over $51 million and received mixed reviews, with critics praising Union's performance but describing the film as having "thinly sketched characters and a slapdash plot."

== Plot ==
After her father Isaac's murder, Shaun Russell travels with her two children, Jasmine and Glover, to the house where she grew up. Shaun intends to settle Isaac's estate and sell the remotely located house, which has multiple security features, including a hand-held remote monitor. When they arrive, the security system is offline, but Jasmine reactivates it.

Unknown to the family, four offenders – Peter, Sam, Duncan, and crime boss Eddie – were already in the house burglarizing it. Jasmine and Glover are taken hostage while Shaun is locked outside and escapes an ambush from Peter. Duncan, the most mentally unstable member of the group suggests torturing the children for the location of the safe but this is objected to by Eddie and Sam. Peter eventually chases Shaun into the woods and gets knocked out by her. She leaves him bound and gagged, and uses the intercom to call the house. Eddie tells her they only came for the safe and the $4 million inside; Isaac was under investigation by both the FBI and the District Attorney and liquidated his assets. The offenders have only ninety minutes from when they sever the phone lines before the security company contacts authorities, so they want to find it and leave quickly.

Concealed in the trees, Shaun sees Maggie, the realtor, arrive with paperwork for the house sale. Eddie greets her at the door, explaining Shaun had gone to town, and attempts to invite her in. Maggie notices Shaun's purse on a table, realizes something is wrong and politely declines. When Maggie turns to leave, Duncan ambushes her and slits her throat, which outrages Eddie, as it means Shaun will not be as controllable.

Shaun finds her way into the house, and gives instructions to Jasmine. When Eddie and Duncan next threaten the children, Jasmine leads them to the safe, which Shaun believes only Peter knows how to open. Shaun returns with Peter, a knife at his throat, demanding her family's release. Eddie shoots Peter dead, and Shaun flees to the woods. Peter had a flash drive containing computer code on a necklace, which is all they needed to crack the safe. With all the money in a bag, Eddie intends to burn the house down with the children in it to cover their escape. Shaun creates a distraction by playing music with the portable hand-held security remote.

Duncan and Sam find Shaun on the roof during another rescue attempt. She hears a gunshot go off inside the house jumps, and pushes Sam off to his death, saving herself with the rope she tied to the roof. Shaun takes Sam's truck keys from his pocket. Meanwhile, Jasmine frees herself and Glover, having cut through their bonds with a shard of glass from a broken lamp. The children escape the house and join their mother with Eddie in pursuit. Using Sam's truck, Shaun mows down Duncan while trying to drive away. However, Eddie blows out the truck tires, causing it to crash and foiling their escape.

Shaun and the kids lock themselves in the house, thinking it is all over until they discover the bag of money is still inside. Shaun's husband Justin arrives and Eddie attacks him, which convinces Shaun to unlock the door. He finds Shaun with the bag, doused in gasoline and holding a lighter. If he kills her, the lighter will ignite the bag. Eddie unloads his gun and Shaun lets him take the bag. However, Duncan appears and stabs Eddie to death, but instead of fleeing with the money, he goes after Shaun and threatens her and Jasmine. Jasmine arrives to help her mom, but Duncan overpowers her. He then prevents Shaun from taking his gun and demands if she has something to say. Shaun replies that he "broke into the wrong house", before swiping Duncan's knife from his pocket and using it to stab him to death.

As the police approach, Shaun goes outside to hold Justin and her kids close.

== Cast ==
- Gabrielle Union as Shaun Russell, the main character who tries to save her kids from criminals.
- Billy Burke as Eddie, the crime boss behind stealing the money.
- Richard Cabral as Duncan, one of the intruders.
- Ajiona Alexus as Jasmine Russell, the teenage daughter of Shaun Russell and the older sister of her brother, Glover.
- Levi Meaden as Sam
- Seth Carr as Glover Russell, the younger brother of Jasmine and son of Shaun.
- Mark Furze as Peter
- Jason George as Justin Russell, the husband of Shaun and the father of Jasmine and Glover.
- Christa Miller as Maggie Harris
- Damien Leake as Isaac, Shaun's deceased father

== Production ==
Principal photography on Breaking In began July 2017 in Los Angeles and Malibu, California.

Universal Pictures released the first official trailer for the film on January 11, 2018.

== Reception ==
=== Box office ===
Breaking In grossed $46.5 million in the United States and Canada, and $4.5 million in other territories, for a worldwide total of $51.1 million, against a production budget of $6 million; it was a box office success. In the United States and Canada, the film was released on May 11, 2018, alongside Life of the Party, and was projected to gross $14–17 million from 2,537 theaters in its opening weekend, with some pundits having it opening in the mid-$20 million range. It made $4.6 million on its first day, including $615,000 from Thursday night previews at 2,150 theaters. It went on to debut to $17.6 million, finishing third, behind Avengers: Infinity War ($62.1 million in its third week) and Life of the Party ($17.9 million); 68% of its audience was female while 73% was over the age of 25. It fell 61% in its second weekend to $6.8 million, finishing fifth at the box office, and another 41% to $4.1 million in its third, finishing sixth.

=== Critical response ===
On review aggregation website Rotten Tomatoes, the film has an approval rating of 27% based on 108 reviews, with an average rating of 4.2/10. The website's critical consensus reads, "Breaking In is proof that Gabrielle Union deserves more leading roles — particularly in films that offer more than this rote, disposable action thriller." On Metacritic, the film has a weighted average score of 42 out of 100, based on reviews from 24 critics, indicating "mixed or average" reviews. Audiences polled by CinemaScore gave the film an average grade of "B" on an A+ to F scale.
