= Short Cinema Journal =

Short Cinema Journal (a.k.a. SHORT) was a DVD Magazine focused on independent short films, interviews and documentaries The first three issues were released via PolyGram Filmed Entertainment. After PolyGram's reorganization, the magazine was picked up by Warner Bros. Home Video (and is still available online, including: Circuit: A Music Journal and Young Cinematographer) who gave it the title SHORT and added short International release issues. The first three issues were re-released by Warner during 1999 and 2000. Beginning with issue 4, the magazine included commercial advertisements that could not be bypassed or fast forwarded through.

The investors (East West Capital and Allen & Company NYC) sold QuickBand Networks to On2 Technologies. The parent company of SHORT was renamed to 2014 after the address "2014 Pacific Ave. Venice, CA 90291". 2014 was the first content start-up to get venture funding in Venice, CA.

== Short Cinema Journal ==
Issue	Title	Contents	Running Time	PolyGram Release Date	Warner Release Date
1:1	Invention	A virtual digest of short features, interviews, and animated short subjects. Films include "Zionsville", "Mr. Resistor", "Shape Without Form", "Black Rider", the animated short "The Big Story" by Tim Watts and David Stoten, and George Hickenlooper's original short "Some Folks Call It a Sling Blade" - the basis for the award-winning feature SLING BLADE starring Billy Bob Thornton. Interviews include punk godfather and monologist Henry Rollins interviewed by Albert Watson and documentarian Michael Apted.	120 min.	1997	November 23, 1999
1:2	Dreams	Documentaries on the making of Jane Campion's "Portrait of a Lady" and on director George Hickenlooper, Hickenlooper's 1997 short adaptation of Orson Welles' "The Big Brass Ring" (with Malcolm McDowell), Jane Campion's "A Girl's Own Story", and "La Jetée" (directed by Chris Marker; the inspiration for Terry Gilliam's Twelve Monkeys).	120 min.	1997	January 4, 2000
1:3	Authority	A virtual digest of short features, interviews, and animated short subjects. Films include "Flying Over Mother", "Os Camaradas", "Joe", "The Whites", and the animated short "Dada" by Piet Kroon. This issue also contains Alain Resnais' powerful documentary short "Night & Fog" about the Holocaust.	120 min.	1999	April 4, 2000
4	Seduction	This edition highlights short fiction, documentary and animation films including "KOM", a film from Norway, and "HISAO", an experimental film about a Japanese singer who dreams of fame in America.	83 min.		June 15, 1999
5	Diversity	Featuring "Silent Rain in the Ninth", "Multi-Facial" starring Vin Diesel, "Buy My Film", "That Strange Person", "The Job", and an interview with contemporary jazz cellist Erik Friedlander.	137 min.		August 17, 1999
6	Insanity	Featuring "Blue City", "Billy's Balloon", "Franky Goes to Hollywood", "Bovine Vendetta", "Midnight Dance", "The Bad Plant", "El Banquete", "Black Coffee", and "60 Channels".	120 min.		October 26, 1999
7	Utopia	Featuring "More", "Zoltar from Zoran", "Lars from 1-10", "Amplified Man", "Images of Korea", "Superstition 9", and "The Lion And the Lamb".	112 min.		February 1, 2000
8	Vision	Featuring "Tag Der Freiheit", a rare Leni Reifenstahl short, "True", "Number One Fan", "Why Liberace?", "The Cinema Ticket", "Serpent And the Sandman", "Sky Above, Heaven Below", and the animated "Kite".	100 min.		May 2, 2000
9	Trust	Featuring "Heather Woodbury's Whatever", "Love Bites", "Clown Car", "The Raven (Der Rabe)", "Sidewalkers", "Tiny Sunbathers", "Bloodlock", "My Beautiful Me", "Still Revolutionaries", "Vertical Air", and "Maestro".	215 min.		July 4, 2000
10	Chaos	George Lucas' "Electronic Labyrinth THX 1138 4EB", "A Short Film About Bad Animals", "Five Feet High and Rising", "The Fly", "Kebabaluba", "Still Revolutionaries", "deliriouspink", "The Bottomless Cup", "Po Mo Knock Knock", and "Burnout".	140 min.		November 7, 2000
11	Ecstasy	The eleventh release in the SHORT series focuses on the extremities of human emotions. Fifteen short films were included which explore a wide range of feelings. Highlights are the award-winning "Hate: A Comedy", which involves a rivalry between a man and a chicken, and "Bass on Titles," a documentary which explores the work of acclaimed graphic designer Saul Bass, who did the remarkable titles for many of Hitchcock's films. The thirteen other shorts included are: "Portrait of Jimmy McGriff", "House", "Mister Smile", "The Closet", "Chuck", "Smash", "Moods of the Sea", "Lovely Day", "Scrub", by Rob Schmidt and Andrew Takeuchi, "Coyote", "Agony or Ecstasy", "What Is Sex", and "Naughty Naughty".	150 min.		February 6, 2001

== Short International Release ==
Issue	Contents	Running Time	Release date
1	Award-winning short films from France, Denmark, Korea, Belgium, China, Germany, Holland, Australia, Mexico and Hungary: Lars von Trier's "Lars From 1–10"; "The Fly", from Hungary chronicles the journey of a common housefly; "Burnout", Truck stop musical experience from Australia; "Du côté de la côte", Agnes Varda's look at the Côte d'Azur c. 1958. Also included "Tiny Sunbathers" (Belgium), "Der Rabe" (The Raven, Germany), "Images of Korea" (Korea), "Superstition" (Mexico), "Arling and Cameron: Music for Imaginary Films" (Holland), and "Hip Hop: The New World Order" (International).	120 min.	October 3, 2000
2	The second release contains "Portrait: Jane Campion and the Portrait of a Lady" (International) with Nicole Kidman, John Malkovich, Barbara Hershey, Shelley Winters, and Richard E. Grant, "Irish Actors: Brosnan and Byrne" (Ireland) with Pierce Brosnan and Gabriel Byrne, "Person Singular: I.M. Pei" (International), an excerpt from the full-length documentary, "Gabriel" (Belgium), "Kaal" (France, India), "Kite" (Hong Kong), inspired by William Turner's artwork, and "Gorky's Zygotic Mynci".	120 min.	December 5, 2000
3	The third release of short video series includes the Academy Award-winning Scottish film "Franz Kafka's It's A Wonderful Life" starring Richard E. Grant, the documentary "Guggenheim Bilbao Museum" with architect Frank Gehry as narrator, live performances by the indie pop bands Tahiti 80 and Mojave 3, interviews with film directors Michael Apted and Constantin Costa-Gavras, and four additional short films.	100 min.	March 6, 2001
