= Ajiona Alexus =

American actress (born 1996)

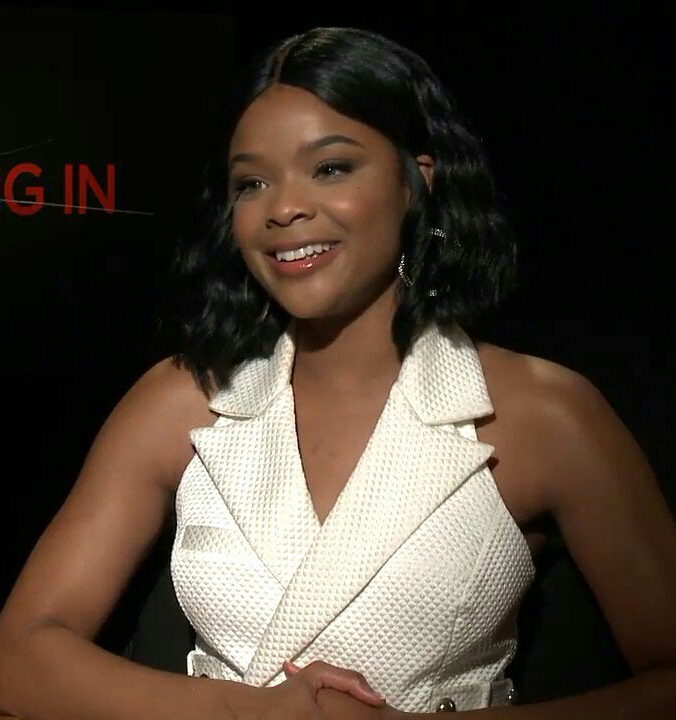
- Alexus in 2018
- Born: Ajiona Alexus Brown; March 16, 1996 (age 30); Tuskegee, Alabama U.S.
- Education: Alabama School of Fine Arts
- Occupations: Actress; singer
- Years active: 2008–present

Ajiona Alexus Brown (born March 16, 1996) is an American actress and singer. She began her career starring in the TV One sitcom The Rickey Smiley Show (2012–2014), and later played Teenage Cookie Lyon in the Fox musical drama series Empire (2016–2019). She starred in the Netflix teen drama series 13 Reasons Why (2017–2018), the Hulu supernatural thriller Light as a Feather (2018–2019), and the Starz crime drama BMF (2021). Alexus also starred in films Something Like Summer (2017), Acrimony (2018), Breaking In (2018), Mary J. Blige's Real Love and Mary J. Blige's Strength of a Woman (2023).

== Early life ==
Alexus was born on March 16, 1996, in Tuskegee, Alabama. She studied Theater Arts at the Alabama School of Fine Arts. She recited her first monologue on stage at age 8. She started her career in 2008, at the age of 12.

== Career ==
From 2012 to 2014, Alexus was a regular cast member in the TV One sitcom The Rickey Smiley Show. In 2015 she made guest starring appearances in Grey's Anatomy and Code Black. She made her film debut appearing opposite Robin Givens in the 2014 drama Unspoken Words, and later had roles in My First Love (2015), Bad Girl (2016) and Something Like Summer (2017). From 2016 to 2019, Alexus played Teenage Cookie Lyon (played by Taraji P. Henson) in the Fox musical drama series, Empire. In 2018, she played Young Melinda Moore in the psychological thriller film, Acrimony also starring Taraji P. Henson. Also in 2018, Alexus starred in the horror film Family Blood, and the action thriller film Breaking In opposite Gabrielle Union.

From 2017 to 2018, Alexus starred as Sheri Holland in the Netflix teen drama series, 13 Reasons Why. In 2018 she was regular cast member in the Hulu supernatural thriller, Light as a Feather. In 2021, she starred in the first season of the Starz crime drama series, BMF. In 2023, Alexus went to star with her BMF co-star Da'Vinchi in Real Love and Strength of a Woman, the two Lifetime movies that were inspired by two of Mary J. Blige's songs.

== Filmography ==
=== Film ===
Year	Title	Role	Notes
2014	Unspoken Words	Tyra	
2015	Sons 2: The Grave	Shawna Wilson	
2015	My First Love	Noelle	Video
2016	Bad Girl	Ruth Quinn Robinson	
2017	Something Like Summer	Alison Cross	
2018	Family Blood	Meegan	
2018	Acrimony	Young Melinda Moore	
2018	Breaking In	Jasmine Russell	
2023	Mary J Blige’s Real Love	Kendra Evans	
2023	Mary J Blige’s Strength Of A Woman	Kendra Evans	
2025	Mary J Blige's Family Affair	Kendra Evans	Also executive producer

=== Television ===
Year	Title	Role	Notes
2012–14	The Rickey Smiley Show	De’Anna	Main cast
2013	Chelsea's Way	Chelsea Mason	TV mini series
2015	Grey's Anatomy	Marissa McKay	Episode: "Crazy Love"
2015	Code Black	Keesha Platt	Episode: "Sometimes It's a Zebra"
2016–19	Empire	Teenage Cookie Lyon	Recurring cast: Season 3, guest: Season 5-6
2017–18	13 Reasons Why	Sheri Holland	Recurring cast: season 1-2
2018	Runaways	Livvie	Recurring cast: season 2
2018–19	Light as a Feather	Candace Preston	Main cast: season 1, guest: season 2
2021	Black Mafia Family	Kato	Main cast: season 1
2022	Tales	Kato	Main cast: season 3, Episode 8, "Murder She Wrote"

== Discography ==
=== Mixtapes ===
List of mixtapes, with selected details
Title	Mixtape details
Radio Ready	Released: June 30, 2012; Formats: Digital download; Label: Earn B Management
Dream Big	Released: June 29, 2017; Formats: Digital download; Label: Earn B Management

=== Singles ===
Title	Year	Album
"Body" (with Jessame)	2020	Non-album single
"Same Mistakes"	2021	TBA

=== Promotional singles ===
Title	Year	Album
"Dream Big"	2013	Dream Big
"Best Friends"	2015	Dream Big

=== Music videos ===
Title	Year	Director
"Best Friends"	2015	Mr_23
"Body" (with Jessame)	2020	
"Give Love On Christmas Day"	2020	Cameron Dean
"Same Mistakes"	2021	Derek Blanks
