= The Raw Report DVD-Magazine =

DVD magazine

The Raw Report DVD-Magazine is a quarterly released DVD magazine series that focuses on the extensive culture of both mainstream and underground hip-hop, while combining key formulas of a print magazine.

The Raw Report DVD-Magazine was founded in early 2003 as a website entitled “Back Stage Pass”, but transformed into a DVD-magazine later the same year. The Raw Report DVD-Magazine, claims its content is "Hip Hop in its RAWEST form!" because of the access and more realistic environment in which they capture hip-hop artist and figures. The style of the content featured on The Raw Report is street oriented, but professional editing makes it a strong competitor for mainstream media, especially with a more realistic approach to the hip-hop sub-culture.

As of August 2006, The Raw Report had released nine full length DVDs, including a special edition catalog entitled "Platinum Plus Series" for rappers Saigon and Ludacris, and a popular DVD from Def Jam artist Young Jeezy Bad Boy Entertainment artist Yung Joc is reportedly next in line, working with The Raw Report for his special edition DVD. In addition to the Platinum Plus Series, The Raw Report' releases a quarterly volume issue, which is a collection of segments based on current music, trends, and popular events. The Volume 4 issue was released in July 2006.

== Controversy ==
The Raw Report DVD-Magazine has been involved with two major issues within the hip-hop industry, the first being with the Black Mafia Family (BMF), The Raw Report was the first to showcase the glitz and glamour of the organization with an in-depth promotional DVD for BMF Entertainment artist Bleu DaVinci.

The second controversial issue The Raw Report has been associated with includes Disturbing tha Peace/Def Jam artist Field Mob. Footage from the DTP DVD was re-edited and spread across the internet, with Field Mob artists Shawn Jay and Smoke heavily criticizing and mocking East Coast rappers. Geffen Records, Disturbing tha Peace and The Raw Report DVD-Magazine all released statements explaining and denouncing the situation.
