= Family Blood =

- Theatrical release poster
- Directed by: Sonny Mallhi
- Written by: Nick Savvides; Sonny Mallhi
- Produced by: Adam Hendricks; John H. Lang; Greg Gilreath
- Starring: Vinessa Shaw; James Ransone; Colin Ford; Ajiona Alexus; Carson Meyer; France Jean-Baptiste; Eloise Lushina
- Cinematography: Larkin Donley
- Edited by: Joel Griffen
- Music by: The Newton Brothers
- Production companies: Blumhouse Productions; Divide/Conquer; Gunpowder & Sky; Seer Capital
- Distributed by: Netflix
- Release date: May 4, 2018
- Running time: 92 minutes
- Country: United States
- Language: English

Family Blood is a 2018 American horror film directed by Sonny Mallhi and written by Nick Savvides and Mallhi. It stars Vinessa Shaw, James Ransone, Colin Ford, Ajiona Alexus, Carson Meyer, France Jean-Baptiste and Eloise Lushina.

Blumhouse Productions, Divide/Conquer and Gunpowder & Sky released the film on May 4, 2018 via Netflix.

== Plot ==
Ellie, a recovering drug addict, has just moved to a new city with her two teenage children. She has struggled to stay sober in the past and is determined to make it work this time, finding a stable job and regularly attending her meetings. Unfortunately, new friends, a new job, and the chance of a new life, can't keep Ellie from slipping once again. Her life changes when she meets Christopher – a different kind of addict – which forces her daughter and son to accept a new version of Ellie.

== Cast ==
- Vinessa Shaw as Ellie
- James Ransone as Christopher
- Colin Ford as Kyle
- Ajiona Alexus as Meegan
- Carson Meyer as Kristen
- France Jean-Baptiste as Mrs. Jensen
- Eloise Lushina as Amy

== Production ==
Principal photography on the film began in October 2016, in Louisville, Kentucky.
