= Rickey Smiley =

American comedian

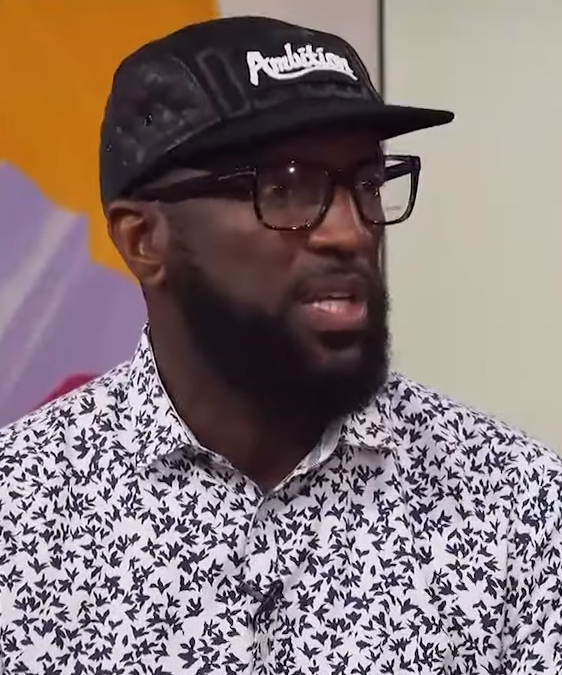
- Smiley appearing on Sister Circle on TV One in 2019
- Born: August 10, 1968 (age 58); Birmingham, Alabama, U.S.
- Education: Alabama State University (BA)
- Occupations: Stand-up comedian; television host; actor; radio personality
- Known for: Comedy
- Children: 4

Broderick Dornell "Rickey" Smiley (born August 10, 1968) is an American stand-up comedian, television host, actor, and radio personality known for his prank phone calls. The calls feature Smiley disguising his voice carrying a conversation with the recipient of the call. He is the host of the nationally syndicated Rickey Smiley Morning Show based in Atlanta from its flagship affiliate WHTA "Hot 107.9". He starred in a sitcom, The Rickey Smiley Show, which aired on TV One. He was also a featured columnist on the Fox-produced tabloid nationally-syndicated TV show Dish Nation. In 2015, Smiley appears on Rickey Smiley For Real, a reality television series about his life.

== Career ==
Smiley appeared as the host of the 2000 season of BET's ComicView program. He has appeared on Showtime at the Apollo, HBO's Def Comedy Jam, HBO's Snaps, The Nashville Network, Uptown Comedy Club, and Comic Escape. His original comedy routines often feature the role-play of fictional characters such as "Bernice Jenkins" (also known as Granny Swims, Ms. Johnson or Mrs. Francis), "Lil' Daryl", "Rusty Dale", and "Beauford". Bernice Jenkins has a grandson named Rufus who's a stereotype of the modern-day "Gangsta". Rufus is in two routines, in "Two Of My Toes Fell Off" and another prank phone call where Smiley calls a pharmacy.

Smiley became the morning show personality for radio station KBFB in Dallas in April 2004. The show features the trademark prank calls as well as news, information, and the latest hip hop music. In 2008, he signed a deal with Syndication One (a syndicated radio division of Radio One) to take the show nationwide and The Rickey Smiley Morning Show is now heard on a number of mainstream urban and urban adult contemporary radio stations. Syndication One merged with Reach Media in 2013.

He has released several humorous songs based on the bits such as "Roll Tide" featuring his redneck character Buford, and "We Miss Robert", based on a routine in which a friend of a deceased drug dealer performs a rap song called "We Miss Robert" at the funeral, which is actually a song about a woman and performed in hopes of landing a record deal. He had a starring role in Ice Cube's Friday After Next. He also appeared in All About the Benjamins as an informant of Ice Cube's character, Snitch Mitch. The performance can be viewed in a deleted scene in the special features of the DVD. Smiley released a book in 2017, Stand by Your Truth: And Then Run for Your Life.

=== Prank calls ===
Some of Smiley's most notable calls include:

- "Buried Alive" - Smiley plays a narcoleptic who works at a funeral home and "fell asleep in one of these caskets" who calls a cemetery claiming that "they done buried me alive" and insists he is calling from inside a casket on his cell phone. He then requests that someone come and "dig all these graves open".
- "Come Over" - In a reverse prank (similar to the ones innovated by the Jerky Boys), "K.D.," a hapless caller, phones a Smiley character named "Gina", a woman who initially entices him with statements like "I'm just 'bout to go crazy over here" and "I want you to come over and hurt me" before revealing that she is a hermaphrodite ("that means I got both genitals"). K.D. assures Gina he is "still comin'", which prompts her to up the stakes by announcing "my grandmama over here too... she a real freak." K.D. then speaks to the grandmother who wants to know "what kind of draws you got on."
- "Uncle Melvin" - Smiley prank calls his uncle, as a man who believes his girlfriend has left him, and who punctuates every remark with the word "dawg" ("Is my girl over there dawg... tell her I love her, dawg").
- "Churches" - Smiley plays two characters, both call Church's Chicken. One is an elderly lady who mistakes Church's for a "church" (e.g. wants to know "what time do y'all start service" and asks "who is y'all's pastor", and "well when d y'all have Sunday school?"). Informed that she has called a restaurant, asks "Don't the chicken belong to the church?" The other caller is "Willie", who claims to be a heavyset man with a thyroid problem, "I can't get out the house no more", and who asks for a rundown of the menu "Is y'all okra fried, or is it all slimy in the pot like grandmama used to make" Willie constantly requests delivery of food to his house.
- "Pray For Me" - Again using his "Granny" voice, Smiley calls "Miss Ola Mae Benton Carter Jackson Glenn", and asks her to pray for a member of her church who was stabbed, involved in an ambulance crash, hit by a train, had a leg cut off by the Jaws of Life, shot "in the right eye."

Smiley gets the woman to sing leading her in several verses of "Walk With Me, Lord", each verse increasing in silliness.

- "She P-E-E-D" - Smiley prank calls an elderly woman using his "Granny" voice; the aftermath of the call causes the woman to laugh so hard that she ends up urinating on herself.
- "Is My Daddy Over There" - Smiley plays Lil' Daryl and his brother Brandon as they call a lady claiming their father was supposed to return home with milk for their cereal. The brothers ask the lady what she has cooked for dinner over there as she ultimately hangs up on them in frustration.
- "Whose Funeral is Today?" - Smiley uses his "Granny" voice and calls a funeral home, asking for her deceased neighbor named Wilbert Smith. She learns that he was cremated and she was oblivious to his death, screaming out in agony when the funeral director repeats that he was cremated. The lady then asks who they are burying this week and offers to go to that funeral to make up for missing Wilbert's. The man tells her that the person they are burying is Hattie Mae Barkley, as she screams out again in agony as it is another person she knows.

== Personal life ==
On July 6, 2020, Smiley announced that his daughter, Aaryn had been shot during a road rage incident the previous weekend.

Smiley is a member of Omega Psi Phi; he was initiated into its Psi Rho graduate chapter. Smiley is a lifetime member of Omega Psi Phi.

On January 29, 2023, Smiley announced his 32-year old-son, Brandon Smiley, had died after being found unconscious in his Birmingham apartment. According to the autopsy report from the Jefferson County Medical Examiner's Office, Brandon's manner of death was ruled as accidental. Smiley subsequently wrote a book about grief and dealing with pain called Sideshow: Living with Loss and Moving Forward with Faith.

== Filmography ==
=== Film ===
Year	Title	Role	Notes
2002	Friday After Next	Santa Claus	
2003	Sweet Hideaway	Ducktape	
2008	First Sunday	Bernice Jenkins	
2010	Stomp the Yard: Homecoming	Finale MC	
2013	Baggage Claim	Calvin	
2015	F**K Child Support	Himself	TV movie
2019	Iron Grit	Interviewee	
2021	Miracles Across 125th Street	-	TV movie

=== Television ===
Year	Title	Role	Notes
1992	Def Comedy Jam	Himself	Episode: "Episode #3.9"
1995	Snaps	Himself	Episode: "Episode #1.1"
2000	Showtime at the Apollo	Himself	Episode: "Goodie Mob/Rickey Smiley"
2003	Players	Himself	Episode: "Less Than Jake, Fred Savage, Jason Sehorn"
2004	ComicView	Himself/Host	Main Host: Season 13
2004	Super Secret Movie Rules	Himself	Episode: "Sports Underdogs"
2006	Comedy Central Presents	Himself	Episode: "Rickey Smiley"
2008-09	1st Amendment Stand Up	Himself	Recurring Guest
2011–19	Dish Nation	Himself/Co-Host	Main Co-Host: Season 1-8
2012	Let's Stay Together	Steve	Episode: "Fear Factor"
2012	Are We There Yet?	Salesman	Episode: "The Expensive Purse Episode"
2012–14	The Rickey Smiley Show	Rickey Smiley	Main Cast
2013	Trumpet Awards	Himself/Co-Host	Main Co-Host
2014–16	Stellar Awards	Himself/Co-Host	Main Co-Host
2014–18	The Real Housewives of Atlanta	Himself	Guest: Season 6, Recurring Cast: 7 & 10
2015–17	Rickey Smiley For Real	Himself	Main Cast
2017	Star	Himself	Episode: "Code of Silence"
2017–20	Black Music Honors	Himself/Co-Host	Main Co-Host
2018	Unsung Hollywood	Himself	Episode: "Ray J" & "Rickey Smiley"
2021	Super Bowl Gospel Celebration	Himself/Co-Host	Main Co-Host

=== Special ===
Year	Title	Role
2003	Latham Entertainment Presents	Himself
2011	Rickey Smiley: Open Casket Sharp	Himself

== Discography ==
To date, Smiley has released six albums of his prank calls:

- The Best of Comedian Rickey Smiley Vol. I
- Rickey Smiley: Prank Calls Vol. II
- Rickey Smiley: Vol. III
- Rickey Smiley "Off The Hook Volume 4"
- Rickey Smiley: Vol. V
- Rickey Smiley: Vol. 6

== See also ==
- Tube Bar prank calls
