= BMF (TV series) =

American crime drama television series

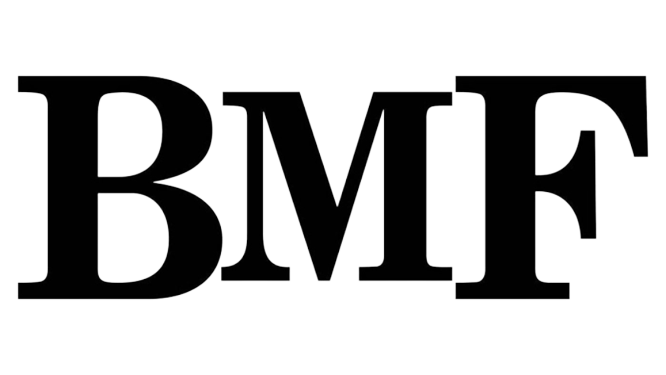
- Genre: Crime drama
- Created by: Randy Huggins
- Starring: Demetrius Flenory Jr.; Da'Vinchi; Russell Hornsby; Michole Briana White; Eric Kofi-Abrefa; Ajiona Alexus; Myles Truitt; Steve Harris; La La Anthony; Kelly Hu
- Opening theme: "Wish Me Luck" by 50 Cent and Charlie Wilson
- Country of origin: United States
- Original language: English
- No. of seasons: 4
- No. of episodes: 38

Production
- Executive producers: Curtis Jackson; Randy Huggins; Terri Kopp; Anthony Wilson; Anne Clements; Tasha Smith
- Running time: 52 minutes
- Production companies: 8 Mile Sconi Productions; Lionsgate Television; G-Unit Films and Television Inc.

Original release
- Network: Starz
- Release: September 26, 2021 – August 15, 2025

BMF (or Black Mafia Family) is an American crime drama television series created by Randy Huggins, which follows the Black Mafia Family, a drug trafficking and money laundering organization. The series premiered on September 26, 2021, on Starz. After the series premiere, the series was renewed for a second season which premiered on January 6, 2023. In January 2023, the series was renewed for a third season, which premiered on March 1, 2024. In February 2024, ahead of the third season premiere, the series was renewed for a fourth season, which premiered on June 6, 2025. In October 2025, the series was canceled after four seasons.

== Plot ==
BMF is inspired by the true story of two brothers who rose from the decaying streets of southwest Detroit in the late 1980s.

== Cast and characters ==
=== Main ===
- Demetrius Flenory Jr. as Demetrius "Big Meech" Flenory, drug kingpin, Charles & Lucille's son, and Terry and Nicole's oldest brother.
- Da'Vinchi as Terry "Southwest T" Flenory, drug kingpin, Charles & Lucille's son, Nicole's older brother and Meech's little brother.
- Russell Hornsby as Charles Flenory, Meech, Terry and Nicole's father, and Lucille's husband.
- Michole Briana White as Lucille Flenory, Charles' wife, and Meech, Terry & Nicole's mother.
- Eric Kofi-Abrefa as Lamar Silas, Meech's rival (seasons 1–2; 4)
- Ajiona Alexus as Katherine "Kato" Eder (season 1)
- Myles Truitt as B-Mickie, Meech & Terry's childhood friend and partner (seasons 1–2; 4).
- Steve Harris as Detective Von Bryant, the detective assigned to stop Meech & Terry's operation.
- La La Anthony as Markeisha Taylor, Terry's new love interest (guest season 1; main season 2–4)
- Kelly Hu as Detective Veronica Jin, Detective Bryant's partner (season 2–3)

=== Recurring ===
- Laila Pruitt as Nicole Flenory, Meech & Terry's little sister and Lucille & Charles' daughter
- Kash Doll as Monique, Lamar's ex & Meech's baby's mother (seasons 1–2)
- Wood Harris as Pat, Meech & Terry's former supplier (season 1)
- Snoop Dogg as Pastor Swift, the pastor of the local church (seasons 1–2)
- Lil Zane as Sockie (seasons 1–2)
- Serayah as Lori Walker (seasons 1–2)
- Markice Moore as Filmel, member of the 12th Street (season 1)
- Myles Bullock as Slick, member of the 12th Street, Lamar's best friend (season 1)
- Christian Robinson as Tiny, member of the 12th Street (seasons 1–2)
- Rafael Castillo as Nedo, member of the 12th Street (seasons 1–2)
- Yusef Thomas as Roland, member of the BMF (season 2–3)
- Sean Michael Gloria as Detective Jonathan Lopez, Bryant's former partner who was killed by Kato as he tried to detain Meech
- Sydney Mitchell as Lawanda
- Tyshawn Freeman as Hoop, member of the BMF
- Peyton Alex Smith as Boom, Markaisha's abusive husband (seasons 1–2; 4)
- Christine Horn as Mabel Jones (season 2)
- Leslie Jones as Federal Agent Tracy Chambers (season 2)
- Caresha Romeka Brownee as Deanna Washington, Ty Washington's wife (season 2)
- Jerel Alston as Kevin Bryant, Detective Bryant's son (seasons 2–3)
- Erica Pinkett as Delia (seasons 2–3)
- Javen Lewis as Markus, Kevin's bully who is killed by Kevin for harassing him constantly (season 2)
- Mo'Nique as Goldie, Meech's new partner who stays in Atlanta (season 2)
- Donnell Rawlings as Alvin, Lamar's cousin (seasons 1–2)
- Mike Merrill as Ty Washington, Meech's partner who was later killed (season 2)
- Jason Louder as Remi Ransom (seasons 2–3)
- Rayan Lawrence as K-9, Meech's loyal partner (season 1–2)
- Stevie Baggs as Officer Hardy, member of the Red Dogs (season 3–4)
- James Kyson as Officer Kang, member of the Red Dogs (season 3–4)
- 2 Chainz as Stacks (season 3)
- Ne-Yo as Rodney 'Greeny' Green (season 3)
- Lil Baby as Payne
- Bailey Tippen as Kitina "Tina" (seasons 2–4)
- Roberto Sanchez as Loco (season 3–4)
- Alex Livinalli as Javier (season 3–4)
- Saweetie as Keeya (season 3–4)
- Cynthia Bailey as Gloria (season 3)
- Michael King as RIP (season 3)
- Ren King as Henrietta Andreas (season 3)
- Christopher B. Duncan as Frank "Blaze" Andreas (season 3)
- Kadianne Whyte as Angel (season 3)
- J. D. Williams as J-Pusha (season 3–4)

=== Cameo appearances ===
- Eminem as White Boy Rick (season 1)
- Jalen Rose as Tariq (season 2)
- Mason Douglas as Tupac Shakur (season 3)
- Shilo Sanders as Deion Sanders (season 3)

== Episodes ==
Season	Episodes	Originally released	
Season	Episodes	First released	Last released
1	8	September 26, 2021	November 21, 2021
2	10	January 6, 2023	March 17, 2023
3	10	March 1, 2024	May 10, 2024
4	10	June 6, 2025	August 15, 2025

=== Season 1 (2021) ===
No. overall	No. in season	Title	Directed by	Written by	Original release date	U.S. viewers (millions)
1	1	"See It... Touch It... Obtain It"	Tasha Smith	Randy Huggins	September 26, 2021	0.369
2	2	"Rumors"	Tasha Smith	Terri Kopp	October 3, 2021	0.386
3	3	"Love All, Trust Few"	Solvan "Slick" Naim	Story by : Frank Renzulli; Teleplay by : Randy Huggins	October 10, 2021	0.368
4	4	"Heroes"	Solvan "Slick" Naim	Patrick Moss	October 17, 2021	0.303
5	5	"Secrets and Lies"	Solvan "Slick" Naim	Kirkland Morris & Terri Kopp	October 24, 2021	0.306
6	6	"Strictly Business"	Eif Rivera	Randy Huggins & Kirkland Morris	October 31, 2021	0.446
7	7	"All in the Family"	Curtis "50 Cent" Jackson	Terri Kopp	November 7, 2021	0.350
8	8	"The King of Detroit"	Tasha Smith	Randy Huggins	November 21, 2021	0.503

=== Season 2 (2023) ===
No. overall	No. in season	Title	Directed by	Written by	Original release date	U.S. viewers (millions)
9	1	"Family Dinner"	Solvan "Slick" Naim	Randy Huggins	January 6, 2023	0.170
10	2	"Family Business"	Solvan "Slick" Naim	Heather Zuhlke	January 13, 2023	0.210
11	3	"Devil's Night"	Janice Cooke	Mike Nguyen Le	January 20, 2023	N/A
12	4	"Runnin' on E"	Janice Cooke	Patrick Moss	January 27, 2023	N/A
13	5	"Moment of Truth"	Eif Rivera	Jeff Dix	February 3, 2023	N/A
14	6	"Homecoming"	Eif Rivera	Kirkland Morris	February 17, 2023	N/A
15	7	"Both Sides of the Fence"	Crystle Roberson	Garen Thomas	February 24, 2023	0.239
16	8	"Push It to the Limit"	Crystle Roberson	Rose McAleese	March 3, 2023	0.175
17	9	"High Treason"	Timothy A. Burton	Heather Zuhlke & Shaquayla Mims	March 10, 2023	0.263
18	10	"New Beginnings"	Eif Rivera	Randy Huggins & Jazmen Darnell Brown	March 17, 2023	0.319

=== Season 3 (2024) ===
No. overall	No. in season	Title	Directed by	Written by	Original release date	U.S. viewers (millions)
19	1	"Detroit vs Everybody"	Timothy A. Burton	Heather Zuhlke	March 1, 2024	0.250
20	2	"Magic Makers"	Ruben Garcia	Kirkland Morris	March 8, 2024	0.214
21	3	"Sanctuary"	Cierra 'Shooter' Glaude	Jazmen Darnell Brown	March 15, 2024	0.262
22	4	"The Return of the Prodigal Son"	Princess Monique	Rose McAleese	March 22, 2024	0.337
23	5	"The Battle of Techwood"	Anton Cropper	Mike Nguyen Le	March 29, 2024	0.220
24	6	"Casualties of War"	Radium Cheung	Garen Thomas	April 5, 2024	0.186
25	7	"Get 'Em Home"	Russell Hornsby	Jeff Dix	April 12, 2024	0.169
26	8	"Code Red"	Crystle Roberson	Shaquayla Mims	April 19, 2024	0.225
27	9	"Death Trap"	Crystle Roberson	Patrick Moss	April 26, 2024	0.246
28	10	"Prime Time"	Timothy A. Burton	Tariq Simmons & Heather Zuhlke	May 10, 2024	0.159

=== Season 4 (2025) ===
No. overall	No. in season	Title	Directed by	Written by	Original release date	U.S. viewers (millions)
29	1	"Graduation Day"	Timothy A. Burton	Heather Zuhlke	June 6, 2025	0.093
30	2	"Discovery"	Russell Hornsby	Raphael Jackson Jr. & Damione Macedon	June 13, 2025	0.112
31	3	"Good Faith"	Timothy A. Burton	Shaquayla Mims	June 20, 2025	N/A
32	4	"Power Trippin'"	Tchaiko Omawale	Tariq Simmons	June 27, 2025	0.147
33	5	"See It, Touch It, Mixtape It"	Katrelle N. Kindred	Patrick Moss	July 4, 2025	0.092
34	6	"Bad Religion"	Cierra 'Shooter' Glaude	Jazmen Darnell Brown	July 11, 2025	N/A
35	7	"Enemy Within"	Carl Seaton	Rose McAleese	July 25, 2025	N/A
36	8	"Death of Hope"	Christine Swanson	Kirkland Morris	August 1, 2025	0.139
37	9	"Point of No Return"	Yangzom Brauen	Jeff Dix	August 8, 2025	N/A
38	10	"Dreams Deferred"	Anton Cropper	Garen Thomas	August 15, 2025	N/A

== Production ==
=== Development ===
In July 2019, it was announced Curtis "50 Cent" Jackson had begun developing a television series revolving around Black Mafia Family, which he would executive produce for Starz. In April 2020, Starz greenlit the series. Production companies are slated to consist of Lionsgate Television and 50 Cent's G-Unit Films and Television Inc. On September 30, 2021, Starz renewed the series for a second season only 4 days after the series' premiere. The second season premiered on January 6, 2023. On January 18, 2023, Starz renewed the series for a third season which premiered on March 1, 2024. On February 29, 2024, prior to the third season premiere, Starz renewed the series for a fourth season which premiered on June 6, 2025. On October 29, 2025, Starz canceled the series after four seasons.

=== Casting ===
In December 2020, Russell Hornsby and Steve Harris joined the cast of the series, with Kash Doll set to star in a recurring role. In January 2021, Demetrius Flenory Jr., Da'Vinchi, Michole Briana White, Ajiona Alexus, Eric Kofi-Abrefa and Myles Truitt joined the cast in starring roles. In March 2021, Snoop Dogg, La La Anthony and Serayah joined the cast in recurring role. In September 2021, Sean Michael Gloria was cast in a recurring role. In March 2022, La La Anthony had been promoted to series regular while Kelly Hu was cast as a new series regular and Christine Horn and Leslie Jones joined the cast in a recurring role for the second season. In February 2023, 2 Chainz and Ne-Yo were cast in recurring roles for the third season.

=== Filming ===
Principal photography began in January 2021 with filming done in Atlanta and Detroit.

During production of season 3 in June 2023, producer Ian Woolf was suspended by Lionsgate following an incident involving Woolf threatening to run over striking writers who were picketing outside of BMF's production facility. Woolf allegedly admitted to trying to scare the writers after first claiming he did not see them, and was unsuccessful in allegedly pleading with Teamsters to cross the picket line.
