= Light as a feather, stiff as a board =

Children's game

Light as a feather, stiff as a board is a game played by children at slumber parties. The phrase has also become established in popular culture as a reference to a levitation trick, and has been referred to in various media accounts. In performing magic this effect is known as abnormal lift.

== Description ==
One participant lies flat on the floor, facing upwards. The others space themselves around that person, each placing one or two fingertips underneath the participant's limbs. The person closest to the head commonly begins by saying something like "She's looking ill", which is repeated several times, and followed by, "she's looking worse", which is also repeated several times. The general direction of the call-and-repeat describes how the person is looking worse and worse, followed by saying "she is dying", and, finally, "she is dead".

Variations of the spoken part of the game occur. In a common, modern version, the person being lifted is told a story about their death and asked to imagine it happening to them. This is intended to unsettle the participants, and to convince them that something may have changed making it easier to lift the person than before.

All versions of the game end with the phrase "light as a feather, stiff as a board" chanted by those standing around the "dead" player as they attempt to lift their companion's body using only their fingertips. Some versions omit the story entirely and only the "light as a feather..." chant is used. After these repetitions, the person being lifted is described by the group as having become lighter or even entirely weightless.

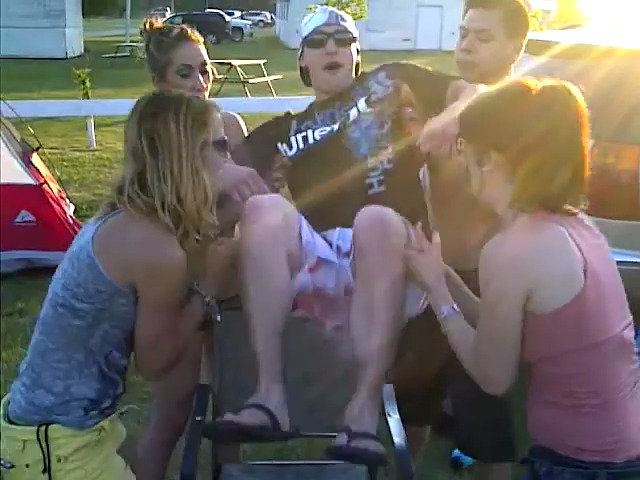
A person being lifted out of their chair by four others

Another variation of the game takes place with one person seated in a chair. Four volunteers agree to stand around the sitter, two on the sitter's left side and the other two on their right. Each of the four places two fingers under each corner of the chair's seat and the four together will attempt to lift the chair and sitter, which generally fails. The volunteers will then perform some small ritual, usually involving rubbing their hands together or circling the chair in various direction (counter-clockwise, walking backwards, etc.) After this ritual, the volunteers hold their hands over the sitter's head to "transfer" energy into the sitter, which will presumably make them weightless. The lifters then retry lifting the sitter the same way as before. Also, it can be that the lifters lift the person sitting in the chair; doing the rest of the ritual as so, but holding at the four main points of the body (under the knees on each side and under the shoulders).

== Explanation of the trick ==
The key to the trick is timing: each of the lifters must apply the lifting force at the same moment. When this is done, the weight of the subject is divided equally between each lifter. Four people raising a 50–80 kg (110–176 lb) person into the air are each only required to lift 12–20 kilograms (26–44 lb).

If the trick is performed without synchronising the lift, it will fail: as participants attempt to lift at slightly different times, they are instead performing a series of lifts by smaller groups, resulting in much more weight to lift per person. This fact may be used as a deliberate form of misdirection from the person explaining the trick, first asking the group to "go ahead, try to lift" to show that it cannot be done, and then asking them to try again on the count of three, where it succeeds.

Another factor in the surprise of the trick is that people are likely to underestimate how strong their fingers are at lifting objects.

Some people who remember performing the trick as a child will have exaggerated their memory of the effect, recalling the performance as lifting the subject effortlessly into the air for some time, when in reality they would only have lifted them for a moment.

== History ==
The oldest known account of levitation play comes from the diary of Samuel Pepys (1633–1703), a British naval administrator. Pepys’s account of levitation play comes from a conversation with a friend of his, Mr. Brisband, who claimed to have seen four little girls playing light as a feather, stiff as a board in Bordeaux, France. Pepys’s account of Mr. Brisband’s experience reads:

He saw four little girls, very young ones, all kneeling, each of them, upon one knee; and one begun the first line, whispering in the ear of the next, and the second to the third, and the third to the fourth, and she to the first. Then the first begun the second line, and so round quite through, and putting each one finger only to a boy that lay flat upon his back on the ground, as if he was dead; at the end of the words, they did with their four fingers raise this boy high as they could reach, and he [Mr. Brisband] being there, and wondering at it, as also being afeared to see it, for they would have had him to have bore a part in saying the words, in the roome of one of the little girles that was so young that they could hardly make her learn to repeat the words, did, for feare there might be some sleight used in it by the boy, or that the boy might be light, call the cook of the house, a very lusty fellow, as Sir G. Carteret's cook, who is very big, and they did raise him in just the same manner.

Pepys also spoke of the chant that accompanied this performance.

Voici un corps mort
Raide comme un bâton,
Froid comme le marbre
Léger comme un esprit,
Lève-toi au nom de Jésus-Christ!

Translation:

Here is a dead body
Stiff as a stick,
Cold as marble
Light as a spirit,
Lift yourself, in the name of Jesus Christ!

The next recording of the game being played comes from The Magician’s Own Book (1857). This account differs from that of Pepys, as it is a direct account of the game being played. Also, this account focuses on a different version of the game than the version played by the girls in Samuel Pepys’ account. In this account, the heaviest man at a party in Venice, Italy, sits in a chair, and is unable to be lifted by six other persons, initially. However, after coordinated hand-clapping and synchronized inhalations and exhalations, the man in the chair is able to be lifted on the forefingers of the six lifters.

The phenomenon has been observed into modern times, often being described as a form of spiritualism or seance and considered anathema by some religious groups. It is widely considered a simple spooky party game along the lines of Bloody Mary and the telling of ghost stories.

The game appears in the 1996 film The Craft, which follows the story of four high school students as they familiarize themselves with witchcraft and various arcane experiments—one of which is light as a feather, stiff as a board. In the movie, the four young women are seen performing the version of the game described in Samuel Pepys’ diary, which involves one participant lying down, while the others kneel around her. The teenagers chant “Light as a feather, stiff as a board,” several times before lifting the participant into the air. In the movie, special effects are used to show the person levitating above the hands of the lifters.

The game appears in the South Park episode "Marjorine", where Butters Stotch declares the other South Park Elementary girls, including Wendy Testaburger, "witches" for playing the game at a slumber party. Butters, as Marjorine, initially mistakes this for the girls "lezzing out".

== See also ==
- Light as a Feather (TV series)

== General and cited references ==
- In-depth explanation of levitation including tricks from Answers.com
- "Halloween Is Good Clean Fun". October 30, 1998 Weekender Lexington Herald-Leader (KY) article for purchase link
- Pajama game: Despite dramatic changes in culture and technology, girls' sleepovers have remained basically the same for generations by MaryEllen Fillo Hartford Courant Aug. 30, 2005 article for purchase link
- Samuel Pepys' diary highlights the experience during the London plague of 1665 as well as the Great Fire in 1666
- Levitation Revisited by Elizabeth Tucker explains the origins of the game and discusses some of its occult history.
- The Magician's Own Book contains an entry on page 341-42 which describes an account of the game being played at a Venetian party.
- The Craft (1996) Light as a feather, Stiff as a board scene.
- Video example 1
- Video example 2
