= Demetrius Flenory Jr. =

American actor and rapper (born 2000)

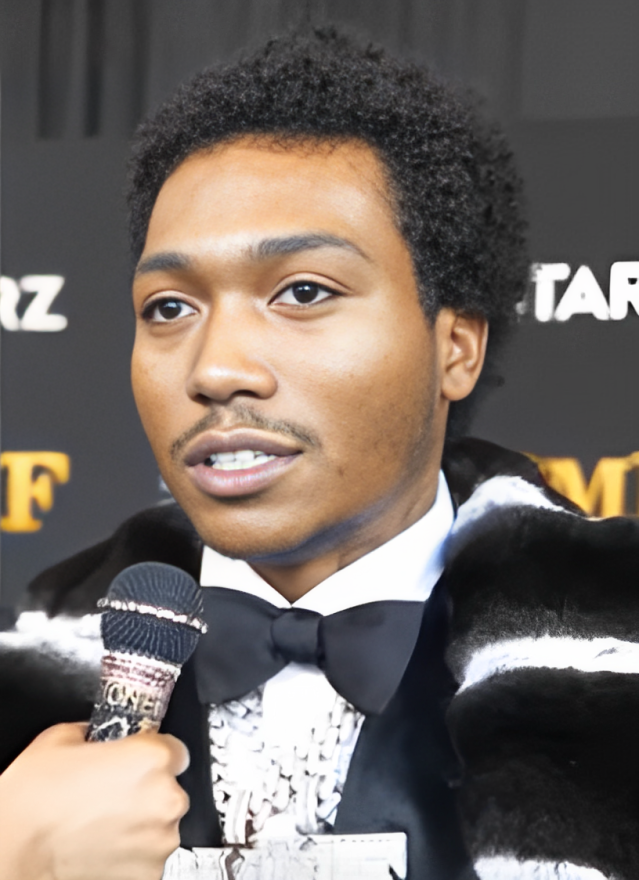
- Flenory in 2021
- Born: Demetrius Edward Flenory Jr. April 22, 2000 (age 26); Miami, Florida, U.S.
- Other name: Lil Meech
- Occupations: Actor; rapper
- Years active: 2019–present
- Known for: Black Mafia Family TV series
- Parent: Demetrius Flenory (father)
- Musical career
- Genres: Hip hop

Demetrius Edward Flenory Jr. (born April 22, 2000) is an American actor and rapper. He rose to fame portraying his father, Demetrius Flenory of Black Mafia Family, in 50 Cent's BMF series adaptation.

== Early life ==
Demetrius "Lil Meech" Flenory Jr. was born in Miami, to Demetrius Flenory Sr. and Latarra Eutsey. His father Demetrius "Big Meech" Flenory Sr. has been incarcerated since Lil Meech was eight years old.

== Career ==
In 2019, under the mononym "Lil Meech" (which is a tribute to his father, "Big Meech"), Flenory Jr. self-released his debut song "Bad Habits." Included in the music video is a half-minute recording of his father conversing from jail.

=== 2021–present: Black Mafia Family and Euphoria ===
Flenory Jr. explains that he received a call from his dad in prison, in which he told him that rapper Curtis "50 Cent" Jackson had the rights to the Black Mafia Family story and a movie or a TV series would be produced. Black Mafia Family would portray the true story of two Detroit brothers, Demetrius "Big Meech" and Terry "Southwest T" Flenory, who make a name for themselves as notorious drug dealers in the 1980s, becoming one of the most influential crime families in America. In the early 2000s, Flenory founded BMF Entertainment, a drug trafficking and money laundering operation that encompassed a record label, hip-hop magazine, and music promotional agency. The first casting call was set in Atlanta, and his father wished for him to meet Jackson so that he could get a sense of how the adaptation was being produced. After falling short of finding an actor, while present at the casting calls, the rapper/executive producer told Flenory Jr. that he wanted to move him to LA and enroll him in acting classes so that he could star in the series as his father. At the time, Flenory Jr. was in enrolled at University of Nevada, Las Vegas studying business. He described the experience as "intense" as he had been taking lessons "five days a week, (sometimes) two times a day, for two years." Jackson shared Flenory Jr.'s father, Demetrius "Big Meech" Flenory was in constant communication with his son, Demetrius "Lil Meech" Flenory Jr. and creator Randy Huggins throughout the whole process of the show's creation. In the beginning of the show's creation, Huggin's didn't believe it was imperative for Flenory Jr. to portray his father.

When speaking about the experience to The New York Post, Flenory Jr. explains:

"At first it sounded crazy — I had never acted before. I was actually in school for business at UNLV, in Las Vegas. [Now] I want to act for the rest of my life. I feel like I found my calling. So, 50 basically brought acting to me. He's the reason that I'm acting. He helped me get the role, but I had to earn it and show the network [that I was the right choice]."

"No one's credibility amounts to his. I just want him to tell me he's proud—he's seen it, and he's happy I did it and I killed it. Once I hear that, then it's all good for me. That's what I want for my family."

— Flenory Jr., about his portrayal of his father in BMF.

Flenory Jr. received positive reception on his role as his father in the BMF television series. The Face described the actor's performance as "brilliant" — despite it being his acting debut. The crime drama series had been renewed for a second season prior to the completed airing of the first season. In August 2021, Flenory was revealed to be a new addition to HBO's Euphoria portraying the character of Travis, a DJ and producer. Being a fan of the show himself, Flenory Jr. explained: "Euphoria touches on a lot of different subjects and it's all real world things. I think it's needed for the culture, that's why so many people love it. I love it. I watched the whole first season and I can't wait for the next. It's the truth, it's real, it's what's happening out there."

== Personal life ==
Flenory Jr. began dating R&B singer Summer Walker in April 2023 to much controversy, before they split on July 31, 2023. On December 12, 2022, Flenory was detained at an airport due to his allegedly having two guns and ammo magazines in his luggage.

== Filmography ==
=== Films ===
Year	Title	Role	Notes	Ref
2022	Taurus	Syl		

=== Television ===
Year	Title	Role	Notes	Ref
2021–2025	BMF	Demetrius "Big Meech" Flenory, Sr.	Main role	
2022	Euphoria	Travis	Guest role (season 2)	
2024	Good Times: Black Again	Quan	Voice role	
