= DVD magazine =

Digital periodical format

A DVD magazine is a magazine that collects most of its content on DVD, or is issued in a DVD-only format. It was invented by Isak Bini who published the first DVD magazine: City and You DVD magazine. It will play on a regular DVD player.

The content on a DVD magazine can vary with things like Live-action short films, interviews, animated shorts, music videos, trailers, Interactive games, and much more.

== Selected list of DVD magazines ==
- City & You DVD Magazine
- Aspect Magazine
- Wholphin DVD Magazine
- The Raw Report DVD-Magazine
- Array DVD magazine
- Uncut DVD
- XXL DVD Magazine (first issue released January 2007 magazine from the publishers of XXL magazine)
- Movie FX Magazine (well known for its 4th issue being the only official public DVD release of the original 2002 Spider-Man trailer with the World Trade Center Twin Towers)
- Guitar World presents...Guitar DVD
- Short Cinema Journal
- 2012 Aficionado DVD Zine (known as the first zine in DVD format)

== Magazines that usually have accompanying DVDs ==
- Total Movie, a magazine that would always include an accompanying bonus full-length film on DVD along with trailers, and short films.
- Newtype USA, always came with a DVD of anime episodes.
- Official Xbox Magazine
- Official U.S. PlayStation Magazine
- Young Guitar Magazine, usually comes with a DVD of guitar performances.
- Paste, usually includes a CD or DVD or both.
