= Light as a Feather (TV series) =

2018 American supernatural thriller TV series

- Genre: Supernatural thriller
- Created by: R. Lee Fleming Jr.
- Based on: Light as a Feather, Stiff as a Board by Zoe Aarsen
- Starring: Liana Liberato; Haley Ramm; Ajiona Alexus; Brianne Tju; Peyton List; Dylan Sprayberry; Jordan Rodrigues; Brent Rivera; Katelyn Nacon; Adriyan Rae
- Composer: Pieter Schlosser
- Country of origin: United States
- Original language: English
- No. of seasons: 2
- No. of episodes: 26

Production
- Executive producers: R. Lee Fleming Jr.; Kelsey Grammer; Shelley Zimmerman; Brin Lukins; Jordan Levin; Joe Davola; Brett Bouttier; Don Dunn; Tom Russo; Jordan McMahon; Brian Sher; Stella Bulochnikov; Aron Levitz; Eric Lehrman
- Producer: Scott Levine
- Cinematography: Ben Hardwicke; Zach Salsman
- Editors: Emily Mendez; Brian Barr; Matthew Diezel; Sean Brown
- Running time: 22–25 minutes
- Production companies: Grammnet Productions; Wattpad Studios; AwesomenessTV

Original release
- Network: Hulu
- Release: October 12, 2018 – October 4, 2019

Light as a Feather is an American supernatural thriller television series, based on the book of the same name by Zoe Aarsen, that premiered on October 12, 2018, on Hulu. The series was created by R. Lee Fleming Jr. and stars Liana Liberato, Haley Ramm, Ajiona Alexus, Brianne Tju, Peyton List, Jordan Rodrigues, Dylan Sprayberry, Brent Rivera, Dorian Brown Pham, Robyn Lively, Katelyn Nacon, Kira Kosarin, Froy Gutierrez, Adriyan Rae, and Alex Wassabi. On July 26, 2019, the first part of the second season, consisting of eight episodes, premiered on Hulu. The second part of the second season was released on Hulu on October 4, 2019.

== Premise ==
Light as a Feather follows "five teen girls as they deal with the supernatural fallout stemming from an innocent game of "light as a feather, stiff as a board". When the girls start dying off in the exact way that was predicted, the survivors must figure out why they're being targeted — and whether the evil force hunting them down is one of their own."

== Cast and characters ==
=== Main ===
- Liana Liberato as McKenna Brady, a shy and popular high school senior and child of divorce. She used to date Henry before his disappearance and now dates Trey. Liberato also portrays Jennie Brady, McKenna's late twin sister, in a recurring role. McKenna is now under the influence of the game and struggles to overcome the curse.
- Haley Ramm as Violet Simmons, a new student at school who recently moved to town with a mysterious secret. She is now free from the game's curse and is dating Isaac.
- Brianne Tju as Alex Portnoy, a popular dancer at school who is dating Peri, while being a cursed player
- Ajiona Alexus as Candace Preston (season 1; guest, season 2), a popular girl at school who is constantly compared to Olivia. She dated Olivia's boyfriend, Isaac, in secret.
- Peyton List as Olivia Richmond (season 1; guest, season 2), the wealthy leader of the popular girls at school, Henry's younger sister, and Isaac's former girlfriend
- Brent Rivera as Isaac Salcedo, a popular high school senior and Candace's and Olivia's former boyfriend. He later dates Violet and is a cursed player.
- Jordan Rodrigues as Trey Emory, McKenna's next-door neighbor and a former member of Sammi's band who dated McKenna and later Sammi. He is a new cursed player.
- Dylan Sprayberry as Henry Richmond, an athletic college student and Olivia's older brother who dated McKenna before he was kidnapped
- Katelyn Nacon as Sammi Karras (season 2), leader and singer of a band, Trey's ex-girlfriend, and one of the new cursed players
- Adriyan Rae as Peri Boudreaux (season 2), Alex's love interest and a college student

=== Recurring ===
- Dorian Brown Pham (season 1) and Robyn Lively (season 2) as Deb Brady, McKenna and Jennie's mother
- Chachi Gonzales as Noreen Listerman (season 1), a classmate of the main group and in the dance group with Alex
- Shelley Robertson as Gloria Preston (season 1), Candace's mother
- Nancy Linehan Charles as Judith (season 1), Violet's grandmother
- Timi Prulhiere as Mrs. Regan, a mother who lost her son, Marc, to the curse
- Harley Graham as Lena Regan, Marc's sister who knows about Violet's prediction
- Kira Kosarin as Nadia Abrams (season 2), an inquisitive barista and one of the new cursed players
- Froy Gutierrez as Ridge Reyes (season 2), a high school student who needs to perform community service, and is one of the new cursed players
- Alisa Allapach as April Portnoy (season 2), Alex's condescending and stuck-up older sister who is a pre-med student
- Alex Wassabi as Luke Chiba (season 2), a high school student who needs to perform community service
- Alan and Alex Stokes (season 2), twins and friends of Sammi
- Brooke Star as Lisa Salcedo (season 2), Isaac's younger sister
- Brea Bee as Sylvia Gallagher (season 2), Peri's accomplice and former nanny
- Alexander Baudo as Aaron Gleeson (season 2)
- Eric Brenner as Charlie Simmons (season 2), Violet's father

=== Guest ===
- Julia Rose as Mrs. Richmond (in "...Dead as a Doornail")
- John Tague as Ed Brady (in "...Cold as Ice")
- Leah Lewis as Gabby Darwish (in "... Innocent as a Lamb")
- Alex Lange as Marc Regan (in "... Innocent as a Lamb"), who was Violet's boyfriend when she was first cursed. He and Violet played the game together and he sacrificed his life for her.
- Timothy Davis-Reed as cop (in "...Slippery as an Eel")
- Julie Benz as Skye Karras (in "...Guilty as Sin")
- Simmi Singh as Jess (in "...Thick as Thieves")

== Episodes ==
Season	Episodes		Originally released
1	10		October 12, 2018
2	16	8	July 26, 2019
2	16	8	October 4, 2019

=== Season 1 (2018) ===
No. overall	No. in season	Title	Directed by	Written by	Original release date
1	1	"...Stiff as a Board"	Alexis Ostrander	R. Lee Fleming Jr.	October 12, 2018
2	2	"...Pretty as a Picture"	Alexis Ostrander	R. Lee Fleming Jr.	October 12, 2018
3	3	"...Dead as a Doornail"	Chad Lowe	Eileen Shim	October 12, 2018
4	4	"...Dark as the Night"	Chad Lowe	Seth M. Sherwood	October 12, 2018
5	5	"...Mad as a Hatter"	Jeffrey W. Byrd	Michael Reisz	October 12, 2018
6	6	"...Troubled as the Tide"	Jeffrey W. Byrd	Seth M. Sherwood	October 12, 2018
7	7	"...Right as Rain"	Geary McLeod	Eileen Shim	October 12, 2018
8	8	"...Cold as Ice"	Geary McLeod	Seth M. Sherwood & Sarah Fiori	October 12, 2018
9	9	"...Innocent as a Lamb"	Alexis Ostrander	R. Lee Fleming Jr. & Seth M. Sherwood	October 12, 2018
10	10	"...Slippery as an Eel"	Alexis Ostrander	R. Lee Fleming Jr.	October 12, 2018

=== Season 2 (2019) ===
No. overall	No. in season	Title	Directed by	Written by	Original release date
Part 1
11	1	"...Lost as Eden"	Joanna Kerns	R. Lee Fleming Jr.	July 26, 2019
12	2	"...Free as a Bird"	Joanna Kerns	Eileen Shim	July 26, 2019
13	3	"...Sly as a Fox"	Geary McLeod	Seth M. Sherwood	July 26, 2019
14	4	"...Sick as a Dog"	Geary McLeod	William H. Brown	July 26, 2019
15	5	"...Silent as the Night"	Shiri Appleby	Pornsak Pichetshote	July 26, 2019
16	6	"...Pale as Death"	Shiri Appleby	Suzanne Keilly	July 26, 2019
17	7	"...Guilty as Sin"	Amanda Row	Eileen Shim	July 26, 2019
18	8	"...White as a Ghost"	Amanda Row	Seth M. Sherwood	July 26, 2019
Part 2
19	9	"...Fresh as a Daisy"	Michael Allowitz	R. Lee Fleming Jr.	October 4, 2019
20	10	"...Trapped as a Rat"	Michael Allowitz	Pornsak Pichetshote	October 4, 2019
21	11	"...Clear as Mud"	Fred Gerber	Eileen Shim	October 4, 2019
22	12	"...Hungry Like a Wolf"	Fred Gerber	William H. Brown	October 4, 2019
23	13	"...Thick as Thieves"	Kristin Windell	Seth M. Sherwood	October 4, 2019
24	14	"...Mean as a Rattlesnake"	Kristin Windell	William H. Brown	October 4, 2019
25	15	"...Quiet as a Tomb"	Joanna Kerns	R. Lee Fleming Jr. & Sarah Fiori	October 4, 2019
26	16	"...Brave as a Lion"	Joanna Kerns	R. Lee Fleming Jr.	October 4, 2019

== Production ==
=== Development ===
On October 8, 2017, it was announced that Hulu had given the production a series order for a first season consisting of ten episodes. The series was created by Lee Fleming Jr. and is based on the book Light as a Feather, Stiff as a Board by Zoe Aarsen. Fleming Jr. is also expected to executive produce alongside Jordan Levin, Shelley Zimmerman, Joe Davola and Brett Bouttier, Aron Levitz, Eric Lehrman, Kelsey Grammer, Tom Russo, Brian Sher, and Stella Bulochnikov. Kailey Marsh is set to act as co-executive producer. Production companies involved with the series include AwesomenessTV, Wattpad, and Grammnet Productions. On June 4, 2018, it was announced that Alexis Ostrander would direct the first two episodes and serve as a co-executive producer for the series. On August 13, 2018, it was announced that the series would premiere on October 12, 2018. On February 5, 2019, it was announced that the series had been renewed for a second season consisting of sixteen episodes.

=== Casting ===
On June 4, 2018, it was announced that Liana Liberato, Haley Ramm, Ajiona Alexus, Brianne Tju, Peyton List, Dylan Sprayberry, Jordan Rodrigues, Brent Rivera, and Dorian Brown Pham had been cast in the series' main roles. On February 5, 2019, it was confirmed that Liberato, Ramm, and Tju would return for the second season. On April 3, 2019, it was confirmed that Rodrigues, Sprayberry, and Rivera would return for the second season. On April 3, 2019, it was also announced that Katelyn Nacon, Kira Kosarin, Froy Gutierrez, Adriyan Rae, Alex Wassabi, Alisa Allapach, Robyn Lively, and Alan and Alex Stokes would join the cast for the second season.

=== Filming ===
Principal photography for the series began on June 4, 2018, and ended on July 31, 2018, in Los Angeles, California.

== Reception ==
=== Critical response ===
The series has been met with a mixed response from critics upon its premiere. On the review aggregation website Rotten Tomatoes, the first season holds a 50% approval rating with critics with an average rating of 4.75 out of 10 based on 10 reviews.

=== Awards and nominations ===
Year	Award	Category	Nominee(s)	Result	Ref.
2019	Daytime Emmy Awards	Outstanding Directing for a Digital Drama Series	Light as a Feather	Nominated	
2019	Daytime Emmy Awards	Outstanding Lead Actress in a Digital Daytime Drama Series	Liana Liberato	Nominated	
2019	Daytime Emmy Awards	Outstanding Supporting Actress in a Digital Daytime Drama Series	Brianne Tju	Nominated	
2019	Daytime Emmy Awards	Outstanding Writing for a Digital Drama Series	Light as a Feather	Nominated	
2020	Daytime Emmy Awards	Outstanding Directing For a Children's or Young Adult Program	Light as a Feather	Nominated	
2020	Daytime Emmy Awards	Outstanding Interactive Media For a Daytime Program	Light as a Feather	Nominated	
2020	Daytime Emmy Awards	Outstanding Principal Performance in a Daytime Program	Liana Liberato	Nominated	
2020	Daytime Emmy Awards	Outstanding Principal Performance in a Daytime Program	Jordan Rodrigues	Nominated	
2020	Daytime Emmy Awards	Outstanding Principal Performance in a Daytime Program	Brianne Tju	Nominated	
2020	Daytime Emmy Awards	Outstanding Young Adult Program	Light as a Feather	Nominated	
