= The Rickey Smiley Show =

- Genre: Sitcom
- Created by: Yolanda Starks-White; Ward White; Rickey Smiley; Anthony C. Hill
- Starring: Rickey Smiley; J. Anthony Brown; Noree Victoria; Ajiona Alexus; Demetria McKinney; Gabriel Burgess; Lil' JJ; Ray J; Roz Ryan
- Composers: Daeus Cannon; Terry Williams
- Country of origin: United States
- Original language: English
- No. of seasons: 3
- No. of episodes: 37

Production
- Executive producers: Rickey Smiley; Roger Bobb; Tia Smith; Ward White; Yolanda Starks-White
- Producer: Angi Bones
- Production location: Atlanta, Georgia
- Camera setup: Multi-camera
- Running time: 20 to 23 minutes
- Production company: Bobbcat Films

Original release
- Network: TV One
- Release: September 18, 2012 – June 26, 2014

The Rickey Smiley Show is an American television sitcom that aired on TV One and premiered September 18, 2012. The series stars Rickey Smiley, J. Anthony Brown, Noree Victoria, Demetria McKinney, Lil' JJ, Ajiona Alexus, Gabriel Burgess, Roz Ryan, and Ray J. The Rickey Smiley Show was renewed for a 26 episode second season in March 2013, that premiered on July 26, 2013. In April 2015, the series was canceled after three seasons.

== Cast ==
- Rickey Smiley as Himself, Bernice Jenkins, Lil' Darryl, Pastor Williams, Clarence the Janitor, T-Bagz and Joe Willie
- J. Anthony Brown as Maurice
- Noree Victoria as Simone
- Demetria McKinney as Monica
- Jay Lewis III as Brandon
- Ajiona Alexus Brown as De’Anna
- Gabriel Burgess as Aaron
- Roz Ryan as Aunt Sylvia
- Ray J. as Kenny
- Jason Weaver as Dollar Andre
- Luenell as Luenell

== Episodes ==
=== Season 1 (2012) ===
No. overall	No. in season	Title	Directed by	Written by	Original release date
1	1	"Promises Promises"	Roger M. Bobb	Anthony C. Hill	September 18, 2012
2	2	"Rap It Up"	Roger M. Bobb	Robin M. Henry	September 18, 2012
3	3	"The Dating Game"	Kim Fields	David A. Arnold	September 25, 2012
4	4	"Cleaning Crisis"	Roger M. Bobb	Myra J	October 2, 2012
5	5	"K.I.S.S.I.N.G"	Roger M. Bobb	Anthony C. Hill	October 16, 2012
6	6	"The Desperate House Wife"	Roger M. Bobb	Robin M. Henry	October 16, 2012
7	7	"The Catch"	Roger M. Bobb	David A. Arnold	October 16, 2012
8	8	"Putting the Fun in Building Fund"	Roger M. Bobb	David A. Arnold	November 20, 2012
9	9	"The Accused"	Kim Fields	David A. Arnold	November 27, 2012
10	10	"Where They Belong"	Kim Fields	David A. Arnold	December 4, 2012

=== Season 2 (2013) ===
No. overall	No. in season	Title	Directed by	Written by	Original release date
11	1	"MC T-Bagg Tribute"	Roger M. Bobb	Karl Douglas	July 26, 2013
12	2	"FOTUS"	Roger M. Bobb	Brian Egeston	July 26, 2013
13	3	"Project Next"	Roger M. Bobb	Robin M. Henry	August 2, 2013
14	4	"Rickey's Roast Beef"	Roger M. Bobb	Robin M. Henry	August 9, 2013
15	5	"You Want to Bet"	Roger M. Bobb	Myra J.	August 16, 2013
16	6	"Fish and Cheeks"	Roger M. Bobb	Myra J.	August 23, 2013
17	7	"Light Camera, Act a Fool"	Roger M. Bobb	David A. Arnold	August 30, 2013
18	8	"Father Knows Funny"	Roger M. Bobb	David A. Arnold	September 6, 2013
19	9	"Reconciliation"	Roger M. Bobb	David A. Arnold	September 13, 2013
20	10	"The Caregiver"	Roger M. Bobb	Robin M. Henry	September 20, 2013
21	11	"It's a Tall World"	Roger M. Bobb	Brian Egeston	September 27, 2013
22	12	"Rickey Has a Stalker"	Roger M. Bobb	Brian Egeston	September 27, 2013
23	13	"Wrong Phi Wrong"	Roger M. Bobb	Brian Egeston	October 11, 2013
24	14	"Captive Christmas"	Roger M. Bobb	Brian Egeston	December 13, 2013

=== Season 3 (2014) ===
No. overall	No. in season	Title	Directed by	Written by	Original release date
25	1	"Solo We Can't Hear It"	Roger M. Bobb	Brian Egeston	April 4, 2014
26	2	"All Rev'd Up"	Roger M. Bobb	Brian Egeston	April 11, 2014
27	3	"The Bachelor"	Roger M. Bobb	Brian Egeston	April 18, 2014
28	4	"Roll Pounce"	Roger M. Bobb	Brian Egeston	April 24, 2014
29	5	"Prank Off"	Roger M. Bobb	Brian Egeston	May 1, 2014
30	6	"Heavenly Host"	Roger M. Bobb	Brian Egeston	May 8, 2014
31	7	"Shacked Up"	Roger M. Bobb	Brian Egeston	May 15, 2014
32	8	"Where's Lil' Daryl"	Roger M. Bobb	Brian Egeston	May 22, 2014
33	9	"The Contender"	Roger M. Bobb	Brian Egeston	May 29, 2014
34	10	"Go Home, Sister Bernice"	Roger M. Bobb	Brian Egeston	June 5, 2014
35	11	"The Defender"	Roger M. Bobb	Brian Egeston	June 12, 2014
36	12	"Unsung"	Roger M. Bobb	Brian Egeston	June 19, 2014
37	13	"Durango"	Roger M. Bobb	Brian Egeston	June 26, 2014
