= Charles Hamilton discography =

- Studio albums: 2
- Extended plays: 8
- Singles: 5
- Music videos: 5
- Mixtapes: 360

The discography of Charles Hamilton, an American recording artist and producer. Hamilton has released three studio albums, one collaboration album, two extended play (EP), one hundred Three-Hundred and Sixty mixtapes, four singles and seven music videos. Hamilton gained major attention after the release of his 2008 eight series mixtape project entitled "The Hamiltonization Process" which included the mixtapes Death Of The Mixtape Rapper, American Gangsta: Who Is Charles Hamilton?, And Then They Played Dilla, Staff Development, It's Charles Hamilton, The L Word, Sonic The Hamilton & Intervention.

Hamilton's debut studio album The Pink Lavalamp, was released on December 8, 2008 and issued on independent record label Demevolist Music Group for free download. Though not included on the album Hamilton's lead first promotional single "Brooklyn Girls" would chart at number ninety-seven on the Billboard Hot R&B/Hip-Hop Songs.

In 2015 Hamilton released his single entitled "New York Raining" with singer Rita Ora, from the Empire: Original Soundtrack from Season 1, it would chart on the number forty-six on the Billboard Hot R&B/Hip-Hop Songs & chart on the Billboard UK Singles Chart at number twenty-nine becoming the rapper's second charting single in seven years. Also in 2015, Hamilton's extended play, The Black Box, debuted at number one-hundred and sixty-eight on the Billboard 200, which would become Hamilton's first charting album on the Billboard.

== Albums ==
=== Studio albums ===
List of albums
Title	Details
The Pink Lavalamp^{[C]}	Released: December 8, 2008; Re-released: April 1, 2018; Label: Demevolist Music Group; Format: digital download, Streaming, LP
Hamilton, Charles	Released: December 9, 2016; Label: First Access, Republic; Format: CD, digital download, Streaming, LP
A Star Never Forgets To Shine	Released: TBD, 2027; Label: Starchasers; Format: CD, digital download, Streaming, LP
"—" denotes an album that did not chart or was not released in that territory.

=== Collaboration albums ===
Title	Details
First Order Of Business (Side A: Plan/Side B: Execute) (with Demevolist Music Group)	Released: February 23, 2009 (US); Label: Demevolist Music Group; Formats: digital download, LP
Hip Hop (with Spud Mack & S.K.E. The Heistman)	Released: April 1, 2014 (US); Label: Big Beard Mafia, Starchasers; Format: Music download, LP
3rd Eye Magic: ABRACADABRA (with C. Young as 3rd Eye Magic)	Released: March 28, 2016 (US); Label: Starchasers, Blue Enigma; Format: Digital download, Streaming, LP
Alakazam: Sessions (with C. Young as 3rd Eye Magic)	Released: October 17, 2018 (US); Label: Blue Enigma, Starchasers; Format: Music download, Streaming, LP
Stop It, Charles! (with C. Young as 3rd Eye Magic)	Released: March 11, 2019 (US); Label: Blue Enigma, Starchasers; Format: Music download, Streaming, LP
Love Money Sex (with C. Young as 3rd Eye Magic)	Released: September 14, 2022 (US); Label: Blue Enigma, Starchasers; Format: Music download, Streaming, LP
Something To Live With (with C. Young as 3rd Eye Magic)	Released: January 20, 2023 (US); Label: Blue Enigma, Starchasers; Format: Music download, Streaming, LP
FREE LiNeAGE (with C. Young as 3rd Eye Magic)	Released: September 14, 2023 (US); Label: Blue Enigma, Starchasers; Format: Music download, Streaming, LP
The Gift (with C. Young as 3rd Eye Magic)	Released: May 13, 2024 (US); Label: Blue Enigma, Starchasers; Format: Music download, Streaming, LP
Official Art Intelligence (with C. Young as 3rd Eye Magic)	Released: January 28, 2025 (US); Label: Blue Enigma, Starchasers; Format: Music download, Streaming, LP
Here We Go Again (with C. Young as 3rd Eye Magic)	Released: June 10, 2025 (US); Label: Blue Enigma, Starchasers; Format: Music download, Streaming, LP
$OMETHING NEW (with TONY NEW)	Released: July 21, 2025 (US); Label: JUSTKEEPGOING, Starchasers; Format: Music download, Streaming, LP
Great Beings (with C. Young as 3rd Eye Magic)	Released: September 6, 2025 (US); Label: Blue Enigma, Starchasers; Format: Music download, Streaming, LP
No Questions Asked (with C. Young as 3rd Eye Magic)	Released: April 19, 2026 (US); Label: Blue Enigma, Starchasers; Format: Music download, Streaming, LP

=== EPs ===
List of extended plays
Title	Album details	Peak chart positions
Title	Album details	US
This Perfect Life EP	Released: August 17, 2009 (US); Label: Demevolist, Interscope; Format: digital download, LP	—
The Black Box EP	Released: December 11, 2015 (US); Label: Turn First, Republic; Format: digital download, Streaming, LP	168
Alakazam (with C. Young as 3rd Eye Magic)	Released: October 27, 2018 (US); Label: Blue Enigma, Starchasers; Format: Music download, Streaming, LP	—
Stop It, Chris! (with C. Young as 3rd Eye Magic)	Released: October 31, 2019 (US); Label: Blue Enigma, Starchasers; Format: Music download, Streaming, LP	—
Controversial (with Serious Truth)	Released: May 25, 2021 (US); Label: Aggravated Mayhem, Starchasers; Format: Music download, Streaming, LP	—
Doja N***a (with C. Young as 3rd Eye Magic)	Released: September 19, 2022 (US); Label: Blue Enigma, Starchasers; Format: Music download, Streaming, LP	—
Olde Headz (with C. Young as 3rd Eye Magic)	Released: February 12, 2025 (US); Label: Blue Enigma, Starchasers; Format: Music download, Streaming, LP	—
Yellow Brickroad (with C. Young as 3rd Eye Magic)	Released: March 30, 2025; Label: Blue Enigma, Starchasers; Format: Music download, Streaming, LP	—
Divine (with C. Young as 3rd Eye Magic)	Released: June 13, 2025 (US); Label: Blue Enigma, Starchasers; Format: Music download, Streaming, LP	—
Refreshing! (with DEAD)	Released: July 21, 2025 (US); Label: Records DK, Starchasers; Format: Music download, Streaming, LP	—

=== Mixtapes ===
List of mixtapes, with selected chart positions
Title	Album details
Crash Landed (Hosted by Skee)	Released: 9 June 2008; Re-released: 4 July 2025; Label: Demevolist Music Group; Formats: digital download, Streaming
Outside Looking (Hosted by DJ Green Lantern)	Released: 27 June 2008; Re-released: 4 July 2025; Label: Demevolist Music Group; Formats: digital download, Streaming
Death Of The Mixtape Rapper (Hosted by Skee)	Released: 2 September 2008; Re-released: 4 July 2025; Label: Demevolist Music Group; Formats: digital download, Streaming
American Gangsta: Who Is Charles Hamilton? (Hosted by Skee)	Released: 6 September 2008; Label: Demevolist Music Group; Formats: digital download, Streaming
And Then They Played Dilla (Hosted by Skee)	Released: 16 September 2008; Label: Demevolist Music Group; Formats: digital download
Staff Development (with Demevolist Music Group) (Hosted by Skee)	Released: 30 September 2008; Label: Demevolist Music Group; Formats: digital download
It's Charles Hamilton (Hosted by Skee)	Released: 15 October 2008; Re-released: 18 September 2025; Label: Demevolist Music Group; Formats: digital download, Streaming
The L Word (Hosted by Skee)	Released: 28 October 2008; Re-released: 4 July 2025; Label: Demevolist Music Group; Formats: digital download, Streaming
StH (Sonic The Hamilton) (Hosted by Skee)	Released: 11 November 2008; Re-released: 4 July 2025; Label: Demevolist Music Group; Formats: digital download, Streaming
Intervention (Hosted by Skee)	Released: 25 November 2008; Re-released: 4 July 2025; Label: Demevolist Music Group; Formats: digital download, Streaming
Ayo! These Niggaz Went Hollywood (with Demevolist Music Group) (Hosted by DJ Tay James)	Released: 1 December 2008; Label: Demevolist Music Group; Formats: digital download
The Broken Pink Lavalamp	Released: 9 December 2008; Label: Demevolist Music Group; Formats: digital download
The Best Of The Hamiltonization Process (Hosted by Skee)	Released: 19 January 2009; Label: Demevolist Music Group; Formats: digital download
Well Isn't This Awkward... (Hosted by Skee)	Released: 13 February 2009; Re-released: 4 July 2025; Label: Demevolist Music Group; Formats: digital download, Streaming
My Brain Is Alive	Released: 15 February 2009; Re-released: 4 July 2025; Label: Demevolist Music Group; Formats: digital download, Streaming
Every Charles Hamilton Ex-Girlfriend's Worse Nightmare	Released: 18 February 2009; Label: Demevolist Music Group; Formats: digital download
The Dead Zone	Released: 31 March 2009; Label: Demevolist Music Group; Formats: digital download
Dope2Go (The Halo+Hamilton Project) (with DJ Halo) (Hosted by DJ Halo)	Released: 17 April 2009; Label: Demevolist Music Group; Formats: digital download
The Binge Vol. 1: Staring At The Lavalamp	Released: 22 April 2009; Label: Demevolist Music Group; Formats: digital download
Shut Up Already (3-Song Mixtape)	Released: 6 May 2009; Label: Demevolist Music Group; Formats: digital download
Normalcy	Released: 28 December 2009; Label: NewCo; Formats: digital download
The Binge Vol. 3: Charles Hamilton's Last Mixtape.	Released: 25 March 2010; Label: Self-released; Formats: digital download
Well This Isn't Awkward (Winner Takes All)	Released: 3 July 2010; Label: Self-released; Formats: digital download
The L Word: Lust & Love (INComplete)	Released: 4 July 2010; Label: Self-released; Formats: digital download
Gynophobia	Released: 14 July 2010; Label: Self-released; Formats: digital download
Atlantis and A... ('08, '09, '10)	Released: 14 July 2010; Label: Self-released; Formats: digital download
10 Things I Hate About Me	Released: 14 July 2010; Label: Self-released; Formats: digital download
Segahamilton.blogspot.com	Released: 6 August 2010; Label: Self-released; Formats: digital download
Starchaser Radio (with H2)	Released: 3 September 2010; Label: Self-released; Formats: digital download
Starchaser Radio 2	Released: 5 September 2010; Label: Self-released; Formats: digital download
For Your Locker	Released: 9 September 2010; Label: Self-released; Format: digital download
Sonic The Hamilton 2: HD	Released: 12 September 2010; Label: Self-released; Formats: digital download
The Blue Lavalamp: M/A/T/E (Mirrors Are The Enemy)	Released: 14 September 2010; Label: Self-released; Formats: digital download
reIntervention	Released: 24 September 2010; Label: Self-released; Formats: digital download
Snap Crackle Pop	Released: 27 September 2010; Label: Self-released; Formats: digital download
One	Released: 27 September 2010; Label: Self-released; Formats: digital download
Mic Check (The L Word 3)	Released: 31 October 2010; Label: Self-released; Formats: digital download
Back To The Future, Back To The Haze (with Corporate)	Released: 20 November 2010; Label: Self-released; Formats: digital download
From the desk of... (Hosted by DJ Whoo Kid)	Released: 1 December 2010; Label: Self-released; Formats: digital download
Spelling Bee	Released: 8 December 2010; Label: Self-released; Formats: digital download
This Perfect 3-Song Mixtape	Released: 11 December 2010; Label: Self-released; Formats: digital download
Where Is Charles Hamilton? (W.I.C.H Craft)	Released: 13 December 2010; Label: Self-released; Formats: digital download
The Hardest Mixtape EVER...Muthafuckas	Released: 14 December 2010; Label: Self-released; Formats: digital download
Flamez Crib (Vol. 1 & 2) (with Demevolist Music Group)	Released: 18 December 2010; Label: Self-released; Formats: digital download
335 (with Demevolist Music Group)	Released: 28 December 2010; Label: Self-released; Formats: digital download
Autumn Harvest:...is a bi-polar rabbit	Released: 3 June 2010; Label: Self-released; Formats: digital download
The Binge Vol. 2: Gathering Dust	Released: 2010 Unknown; Label: Self-released; Formats: digital download
I Know Y'all Aint Got These	Released: 21 January 2011; Label: Self-released; Formats: digital download
Attempt At Swag	Released: 8 February 2011; Label: Self-released; Formats: digital download
The Power Of Illumination	Released: 12 February 2011; Label: Self-released; Formats: digital download
Behind The Lavalamp (I'm Not Gay)	Released: 25 April 2011; Label: Self-released; Formats: digital download
#NHF	Released: 25 April 2011; Label: Self-released; Formats: digital download
Charlie And The Chocolate Factory	Released: 20 May 2011; Label: Self-released; Formats: digital download
Sober Karaoke^{[D]}	Released: 18 July 2011; Label: Self-released; Formats: digital download
C.A.T.S. Can	Released: 23 September 2011; Label: Self-released; Formats: digital download
What The Hell's Wrong With You?!	Released: 5 October 2011; Label: Self-released; Formats: digital download
The UP	Released: 7 October 2011; Label: Self-released; Formats: digital download
Arguments With Briana (with Briana Latrise)	Released: 31 October 2011; Label: Self-released; Formats: digital download
Happy 9th Birthday	Released: 18 November 2011; Label: Self-released; Formats: digital download
Excellence Of Execution: The Pink And Black Attack	Released: 4 December 2011; Label: Self-released; Formats: digital download
And Then They Played Dilla 2: Fuck House Shoes	Released: Unknown 2011; Label: Self-released; Formats: digital download
Arguments with Briana: When I Wanna Wonder	Released: Unknown 2011; Label: Self-released; Formats: digital download
StH3: The Red Shoe Diaries/Entitlement/DOOM Kitty	Released: Unknown 2011; Label: Self-released; Formats: digital download
The Truth Is Pink	Released: Unknown 2011; Label: Self-released; Formats: digital download
Speechless In Brooklyn	Released: 12 January 2012; Label: Self-released; Formats: digital download
LoadItCockItAimItBaby	Released: January 2012; Label: Self-released; Formats: digital download
Andrea Mendez (The Opera Album)	Released: 5 February 2012; Label: Self-released; Formats: digital download
ATNPM (After Them Niggas Played Madlib)	Released: 5 February 2012; Label: Self-released; Formats: digital download
Hov Kitty (3/21)	Released: 16 March 2012; Label: Self-released; Formats: digital download
Camera Coolant (Egyptian Circus)	Released: 23 April 2012; Label: Self-released; Formats: digital download
Coke Whore Habits	Released: 23 April 2012; Label: Self-released; Formats: digital download
2012ilton: Music Inspired By Diablo III	Released: 23 May 2012; Label: Self-released; Formats: digital download
Ill Doesn't Meen Classic	Released: 7 July 2012; Label: Self-released; Formats: digital download
Minaj Kitty (Awkward 3: CampusRedCarpet)	Released: 12 July 2012; Label: Self-released; Formats: digital download
Uncle Jigga's Wardrobe	Released: 12 July 2012; Label: Self-released; Formats: digital download
The Black Owl	Released: 2 August 2012; Label: Self-released; Formats: digital download
August 14th: Doom Thousand & Twelve	Released: 10 August 2012; Label: Self-released; Formats: digital download
I Always Die In Brooklyn	Released: 25 August 2012; Label: Self-released; Formats: digital download
StH4: Shadow the Hamilton	Released: 29 August 2012; Label: Self-released; Formats: digital download
Cinematic Hallucinations presents: The Bully & The Pet (with S.K.E. The Heistman)	Released: 6 September 2012; Label: Self-released; Formats: digital download
Jack and the Box	Released: 26 October 2012; Label: Self-released; Formats: digital download
the L Word V: Madonna's Submission	Released: 6 November 2012; Label: Self-released; Formats: digital download
The Nils Styger Mixtape (with The Alchemist)	Released: 1 December 2012; Label: Self-released; Formats: digital download
The Come Down	Released: 21 December 2012 (US); Label: Self-released; Format: digital download
StHRezzurexion	Released: 23 December 2012; Label: Self-released; Formats: digital download
Ugly Desdemona	Released: 23 December 2012; Label: Self-released; Formats: digital download
(KittyKitty) Awkwarde 4: Beyonce's War	Released: Unknown 2012; Label: Self-released; Formats: digital download
4Whore/StanleyIpkiss	Released: Unknown 2012; Label: Self-released; Formats: digital download
And Then They Played Dilla 3: LifeSentence	Released: Unknown, 2012; Label: Self-released; Formats: digital download
Al Simmon's Wedding Ring	Released: Unknown 2012; Label: Self-released; Formats: digital download
Amberses	Released: Unknown 2012; Label: Self-released; Formats: digital download
As A Mogul	Released: Unknown 2012; Label: Self-released; Formats: digital download
As A Street Rat	Released: Unknown 2012; Label: Self-released; Formats: digital download
Astro's Alchemized Science Project	Released: Unknown, 2012; Label: Self-released; Formats: digital download
Bug Out	Released: Unknown 2012; Label: Self-released; Formats: digital download
Chinese Laundry	Released: Unknown 2012; Label: Self-released; Formats: digital download
Dragonfly Destiny	Released: Unknown 2012; Label: Self-released; Formats: Music download, LP
E.O.C.H. Vol. 1 (The Mind Of Charles Hamilton)	Released: Unknown 2012; Label: Self-released; Formats: digital download
E.O.C.H. Vol. 2 (The Body Of Charles Hamilton)	Released: Unknown 2012; Label: Self-released; Formats: digital download
Edge's First Mixtape (TCHE)	Released: Unknown 2012; Label: Self-released; Formats: digital download
Happy 9th Birthday! 2: Cruel Halloween OST	Released: Unknown 2012; Label: Self-released; Formats: digital download
Herbal Essences Recall Order (She's My HERO)	Released: Unknown 2012; Label: Self-released; Formats: digital download
Getting High Before Graduation	Released: Unknown 2012; Label: Self-released; Formats: digital download
Gullible Me	Released: Unknown 2012; Label: Self-released; Formats: digital download
MPCH=Gadget and Friends	Released: Unknown 2012; Label: Self-released; Formats: digital download
Miami Heroine (Overdosage Of Liters)	Released: Unknown 2012; Label: Self-released; Formats: digital download
Nadia Psalms	Released: Unknown 2012; Label: Self-released; Formats: digital download
Phoenix Thursday	Released: Unknown 2012; Label: Self-released; Formats: digital download
Separation Anxiety	Released: Unknown 2012; Label: Self-released; Formats: digital download
Staff Development 2: Cold Case (with Sha-Leik) (Hosted by Sha-Leik)	Released: Unknown 2012; Label: Self-released; Formats: digital download
StH5: SILver the Hamilton	Released: Unknown 2012; Label: Self-released; Formats: digital download
Tafie2much: One 4 FDA	Released: Unknown 2012; Label: Self-released; Formats: digital download
Thank You, Dr. Doom Vol. 1	Released: Unknown 2012; Label: Self-released; Formats: digital download
the end of Charles Hamilton.	Released: Unknown 2012; Label: Self-released; Formats: digital download
The Heart Of Charles Hamilton	Released: Unknown 2012; Label: Self-released; Formats: digital download
The L Word 4: She's A Subtitle	Released: Unknown 2012; Label: Self-released; Formats: digital download
The Soul Of Charles Hamilton	Released: Unknown 2012; Label: Self-released; Formats: digital download
The Spiral Notebook	Released: Unknown 2012; Label: Self-released; Formats: digital download
The Starlight Zone	Released: Unknown 2012; Label: Self-released; Formats: digital download
Waitin' On Tasha	Released: Unknown 2012; Label: Self-released; Formats: digital download
War With The Bullies	Released: Unknown 2012; Label: Self-released; Formats: digital download
Catholic Illuminati: V2k12	Released: 25 February 2013; Label: Self-released; Formats: digital download
Catholic Illuminati: Papal Infallibility	Released: 28 February 2013; Label: Self-released; Formats: digital download
MyPinkFriday.com	Released: 30 April 2013; Label: Self-released; Formats: digital download
Rhapsody Case Closed	Released: 30 April 2013; Label: Self-released; Formats: digital download
TWA Flight 801: Trailblazin'	Released: June 2, 2013; Label: Self-released; Formats: digital download
Death And The Downs	Released: 28 June 2013; Label: Self-released; Formats: digital download
SkateKey In '87	Released: 17 August 2013; Label: Self-released; Formats: digital download
TWA Flight 801: Steve Smith And The Blazer	Released: 17 August 2013; Label: Self-released; Formats: digital download
TWA Flight 801: The Clyde Drexler Spell	Released: 27 August 2013; Label: Self-released; Formats: digital download
Autumn Holocaust (EscapeFromTheDeadZone)	Released: 23 October 2013; Label: Self-released; Formats: digital download
StHZERO: The Death of Charles Hamilton	Released: 1 November 2013; Label: Self-released; Formats: digital download
Winter Rush (EscapeFromTheDeadZone)	Released: 10 November 2013; Label: Self-released; Formats: digital download
StHRezzurexion	Released: 17 December 2013; Label: Self-released; Formats: digital download
A Shot In The Dark	Released: Unknown 2013; Label: Self-released; Formats: digital download
And Then They Played Dilla IV: The Nastiest, Freakiest, Ratchetist Tribute You Could Ever Hear	Released: Unknown 2013; Label: Self-released; Formats: digital download
Apocalyptic Rebellion	Released: Unknown 2013; Label: Self-released; Formats: digital download
Catholic Illuminati: Infinite Psalms	Released: Unknown 2013; Label: Self-released; Formats: digital download
Catholic Illuminati: The 9th Wonder Album	Released: Unknown 2013; Label: Self-released; Formats: digital download
CH's Garage Sale	Released: Unknown 2013; Label: Self-released; Formats: digital download
Happy 9th Birthday! Pt. 3: Nicki Minaj Goes To London	Released: Unknown 2013; Label: Self-released; Formats: digital download
Kids In The Jungle	Released: Unknown 2013; Label: Self-released; Formats: digital download
Last Train To London: The Album	Released: Unknown 2013; Label: Self-released; Formats: digital download
Macaroni Surprise	Released: Unknown 2013; Label: Self-released; Formats: digital download
Undone London	Released: Unknown 2013; Label: Self-released; Formats: digital download
Unforgiven	Released: 27 June 2014; Label: Self-released; Formats: digital download
Antithesis	Released: 29 June 2014; Label: Self-released; Formats: digital download
Aware (Hosted by RapHeat.Com)	Released: 6 July 2014; Label: Self-released; Formats: digital download
A Bad Representation of Ugly	Released: Unknown 2014; Label: Self-released; Formats: digital download
African Child	Released: Unknown 2014; Label: Self-released; Formats: digital download
Boy Who Played With Barbie	Released: Unknown 2014; Label: Self-released; Formats: digital download
Chef Salad (with S.K.E The Heistman & Spud Mack) (Hosted by TearDropz)	Released: Unknown 2014; Label: Self-released; Formats: digital download
Chronometry	Released: Unknown, 2014; Label: Self-released; Formats: digital download
Forbidden Sunday	Released: Unknown 2014; Label: Self-released; Formats: digital download
GunForRiven	Released: Unknown 2014; Label: Self-released; Formats: digital download
If Ever I	Released: Unknown 2014; Label: Self-released; Formats: digital download
Man Of The House	Released: Unknown 2014; Label: Self-released; Formats: digital download
My Two Dads	Released: Unknown 2014; Label: Self-released; Formats: digital download
Vampire Sunlight	Released: Unknown 2014; Label: Self-released; Formats: digital download
Iconoclast	Released: Unknown 2015; Label: Self-released; Formats: digital download
Loud and Wrong	Released: January 24, 2016; Label: Starchasers; Formats: digital download
The Byte	Released: March 13, 2016; Label: Starchasers; Formats: digital download
When Razor Met Wrist	Released: March 13, 2016; Label: Starchasers; Formats: digital download
Fear the Reaper	Released: March 18, 2016; Label: Starchasers; Formats: digital download
Feel the Reaper	Released: March 18, 2016; Label: Starchasers; Formats: digital download
Kill the Reaper	Released: March 18, 2016; Label: Starchasers; Formats: digital download
Anti-Hamilton	Released: March 30, 2016; Label: Starchasers; Formats: digital download
SEGA Goes To Hell	Released: April 2, 2016; Label: Starchasers; Formats: digital download
StH: Chaos	Released: April 2, 2016; Label: Starchasers; Formats: digital download
StH: Chaos vs Knuckles	Released: April 2, 2016; Label: Starchasers; Formats: digital download
StH: The Rize of KnuckLES	Released: April 2, 2016; Label: Starchasers; Formats: digital download
The L Word: Ultimate	Released: April 3, 2016; Label: Starchasers; Formats: digital download
Here We Go Again...	Released: April 8, 2016; Label: Starchasers; Formats: digital download
Mastery: The Love Album	Released: April 26, 2016; Label: Starchasers; Formats: digital download
Cloud 9	Released: April 29, 2016; Label: Starchasers; Formats: digital download
Smart Water (with Enjetic)	Released: April 29, 2016; Label: Starchasers; Formats: digital download
Bacharach Attacks!	Released: May 15, 2016; Label: Starchasers; Formats: digital download
Pet the Scorpion	Released: May 15, 2016; Label: Starchasers; Formats: digital download
Blankets In Hell	Released: May 21, 2016; Label: Starchasers; Formats: digital download
Please Listen To My Memo	Released: June 5, 2016; Label: Starchasers; Formats: digital download
Just Go!	Released: June 6, 2016; Label: Starchasers; Formats: digital download
MoreMagick	Released: June 25, 2016; Label: Starchasers; Formats: digital download
Charles & Saner	Unreleased: July 3, 2018; Label: Starchasers; Formats: digital download
Music and My Woman	Released: December 2, 2021; Label: Starchasers; Formats: digital download
Darth The Hamilton	Released: December 4, 2021; Label: Starchasers; Formats: digital download
Acts 9	Released: December 5, 2021; Label: Starchasers; Formats: digital download
Humble	Released: December 5, 2021; Label: Starchasers; Formats: digital download
3 Hots and a Cot	Released: December 7, 2021; Label: Starchasers; Formats: digital download
Rebound	Released: December 12, 2021; Label: Starchasers; Formats: digital download
Auntie Fasss the mixtape	Released: December 17, 2021; Label: Starchasers; Formats: digital download
The 5 Album	Released: December 20, 2021; Label: Starchasers; Formats: digital download
Earwax	Released: December 24, 2021; Label: Starchasers; Formats: digital download
GothButterSoul 3-4	Released: December 24, 2021; Label: Starchasers; Formats: digital download
Rock Star Saint	Released: December 24, 2021; Label: Starchasers; Formats: digital download
Bright Side Of The Sun	Released: December 26, 2021; Label: Starchasers; Formats: digital download
Humble Body Langauge	Released: December 26, 2021; Label: Starchasers; Formats: digital download
LA Law	Released: December 26, 2021; Label: Starchasers; Formats: digital download
Hypergoth!	Released: December 25, 2022; Label: Starchasers; Formats: digital download, Streaming
Cecelia	Released: August 5, 2023; Label: Starchasers; Formats: digital download
Hypergoth! Jr	Released: August 17, 2023; Label: Starchasers; Formats: digital download
Hypergoth! Jr Instrunmentals	Released: August 17, 2023; Label: Starchasers; Formats: digital download
Cecelia Instrumentals	Released: August 5, 2023; Label: Starchasers; Formats: digital download
DTLA	Released: September 14, 2023; Label: Starchasers; Formats: digital download
DTLA Instrumentals	Released: September 14, 2023; Label: Starchasers; Formats: digital download
Co-Existence	Released: September 14, 2023; Label: Starchasers; Formats: digital download
Co-Existence Instrumentals	Released: September 14, 2023; Label: Starchasers; Formats: digital download
Equations	Released: August 5, 2023; Label: Starchasers; Formats: digital download
Equations Instrumentals	Released: August 5, 2023; Label: Starchasers; Formats: digital download
Pronouced Hamilton Comma Charles (instrumental album)	Released: August 8, 2023; Label: Starchasers; Formats: digital download
The Get Down	Released: August 8, 2023; Label: Starchasers; Formats: digital download
The Get Down Instrumentals	Released: August 8, 2023; Label: Starchasers; Formats: digital download
Terminal Shutdown	Released: August 16, 2023; Label: Starchasers; Formats: digital download
Terminal Shutdown Instrumentals	Released: August 16, 2023; Label: Starchasers; Formats: digital download
StarChaser Bars	Released: August 17, 2023; Label: Starchasers; Formats: digital download
TTNH Goldmember	Released: August 24, 2023; Label: Starchasers; Formats: digital download
The Pits of Hell	Released: August 25, 2023; Label: Starchasers; Formats: digital download
The Pits of Hell Instrumentals	Released: August 25, 2023; Label: Starchasers; Formats: digital download
The King's Maker	Released: August 25, 2023; Label: Starchasers; Formats: digital download
Thank You For Using GTL (#CGi mixtape)	Released: August 30, 2023; Label: Starchasers; Formats: digital download
Flat Tire	Released: September 14, 2023; Label: Starchasers; Formats: digital download
Flat Tire Instrumentals	Released: September 14, 2023; Label: Starchasers; Formats: digital download
PBS Radio: The Mixtape For Viewers Like You	Released: October 18, 2023; Label: Starchasers; Formats: digital download
Starbucks Wholism	Released: October 22, 2023; Label: Starchasers; Formats: digital download
Black Candle	Released: October 23, 2023; Label: Starchasers; Formats: digital download
Black Candle Instrumentals	Released: October 23, 2023; Label: Starchasers; Formats: digital download
Viewers Like You	Released: October 31, 2023; Label: Starchasers; Formats: digital download
Stardust	Released: November 5, 2023; Label: Starchasers; Formats: digital download
Stardust Instrumentals	Released: November 5, 2023; Label: Starchasers; Formats: digital download
The Gaza Strip (a mixtape)	Released: November 6, 2023; Label: Starchasers; Formats: digital download
Platinum Plus	Released: January 27, 2024; Label: Starchasers; Formats: digital download
gowiththeflow	Released: April 4,2024; Label: Starchasers; Formats: digital download
Doom	Released: April 9, 2024; Label: Starchasers; Formats: digital download
Doom Instrumentals	Released: April 9, 2024; Label: Starchasers; Formats: digital download
2024 Pandemic	Released: April 9, 2024; Label: Starchasers; Formats: digital download
2At The Table (Instrumental Album)	Released: April 9, 2024; Label: Starchasers; Formats: digital download
Classic Village	Released: April 9, 2024; Label: Starchasers; Formats: digital download
Comin' Thru w The Future	Released: April 9, 2024; Label: Starchasers; Formats: digital download
Cold Pizza	Released: April 9, 2024; Label: Starchasers; Formats: digital download
The King Charles Era	Released: April 9, 2024; Label: Starchasers; Formats: digital download
Mischief Instrumentals	Released: April 9, 2024; Label: Starchasers; Formats: digital download
My Highness	Released: April 9, 2024; Label: Starchasers; Formats: digital download
My Lords Pray Be Saved	Released: April 9, 2024; Label: Starchasers; Formats: digital download
Outside!	Released: April 9, 2024; Label: Starchasers; Formats: digital download
Pressure	Released: April 9, 2024; Label: Starchasers; Formats: digital download
Quickies	Released: April 9, 2024; Label: Starchasers; Formats: digital download
Random Voodo	Released: April 9, 2024; Label: Starchasers; Formats: digital download
Rogue Trip	Released: April 9, 2024; Label: Starchasers; Formats: digital download
Side Effects Of Fame	Released: April 9, 2024; Label: Starchasers; Formats: digital download
The Soul's Departure	Released: April 9, 2024; Label: Starchasers; Formats: digital download
Vilgilante	Released: April 9, 2024; Label: Starchasers; Formats: digital download
Vilgilante Instrumentals	Released: April 9, 2024; Label: Starchasers; Formats: digital download
Mindbeats	Released: April 16, 2024; Label: Starchasers; Formats: digital download
Beats 4 CYoung	Released: April 17, 2024; Label: Starchasers; Formats: digital download
Beats 4 Lou	Released: April 17, 2024; Label: Starchasers; Formats: digital download
Beats 4 Yung Nate	Released: April 17, 2024; Label: Starchasers; Formats: digital download
Redemption	Released: April 18, 2024; Label: Starchasers; Formats: digital download
Redemption Items	Released: April 18, 2024; Label: Starchasers; Formats: digital download
Electronic Christmas	Released: April 20, 2024; Label: Starchasers; Formats: digital download
Conviction	Released: April 25, 2024; Label: Starchasers; Formats: digital download
Conviction Instrumentals	Released: April 25, 2024; Label: Starchasers; Formats: digital download
Live @ 12	Released: April 29, 2024; Label: Starchasers; Formats: digital download
Kingly Grindin'	Released: April 29, 2024; Label: Starchasers; Formats: digital download
KingCharles	Released: April 29, 2024; Label: Starchasers; Formats: digital download
Alienbars	Released: April 29, 2024; Label: Starchasers; Formats: digital download
CosmictrippiN	Released: April 29, 2024; Label: Starchasers; Formats: digital download
Temptation	Released: May 15, 2024; Label: Starchasers; Formats: digital download
Temptation Instrumentals	Released: May 15, 2024; Label: Starchasers; Formats: digital download
Goldmember	Released: June 18, 2024; Label: Starchasers; Formats: digital download
Sinner's Mood	Released: June 18, 2024; Label: Starchasers; Formats: digital download
More Live @ 12: The Album	Released: July 17, 2024; Label: Starchasers; Formats: digital download
More Live @ 12: The Instrumentals	Released: July 17, 2024; Label: Starchasers; Formats: digital download
Fucked Up Things: The EP	Released: July 18, 2024; Label: Starchasers; Formats: digital download
Back Outside	Released: August 13,2024; Label: Starchasers; Formats: digital download
Baptism (The Mixtape)	Released: August 13,2024; Label: Starchasers; Formats: digital download
Cold Pizza The EP	Released: August 2, 2024; Label: Starchasers; Formats: digital download
CPU Only (#NoWarning)	Released: August 4, 2024; Label: Starchasers; Formats: digital download
#therebirth	Released: August 13,2024; Label: Starchasers; Formats: digital download
Random CH Jointz	Released: August 27, 2024; Label: Starchasers; Formats: digital download
Quazar Boogie	Released: August 27, 2024; Label: Starchasers; Formats: digital download
Sonic Movie 3 OST	Released: August 27, 2024; Label: Starchasers; Formats: digital download
Sonic Movie 3 Instrumentals	Released: August 27, 2024; Label: Starchasers; Formats: digital download
The Xenomorph	Released: August 27, 2024; Label: Starchasers; Formats: digital download
The Xenomorph Instrumentals	Released: August 27, 2024; Label: Starchasers; Formats: digital download
Here's Hamilton Launching	Released: September 20, 2024; Label: Starchasers; Formats: digital download
Yes Sir!	Released: May 17, 2025; Label: Starchasers; Formats: digital download
me-n- Lil Chris	Released: September 22, 2024; Label: Starchasers; Formats: digital download
King Matters	Released: September 28, 2024; Label: Starchasers; Formats: digital download
The Tree Of Knowledge	Released: September 30, 2024; Label: Starchasers; Formats: digital download
Xarles & dylAn	Released: October 3, 2024; Label: Starchasers; Format
Holiday Cheer	Released: December 14, 2024; Label: Starchasers; Formats: digital download
Mischief	Released: December 14, 2024; Label: Starchasers; Formats: digital download
The Master	Released: December 16, 2024; Label: Starchasers; Formats: digital download
Contraband	Released: March 5, 2025; Label: Starchasers; Formats: digital download
Contraband Instrumentals	Released: March 5, 2025; Label: Starchasers; Formats: digital download
Dr. Hamilton Jams	Released: March 5, 2025; Label: Starchasers; Formats: digital download
Dr. Hamilton Presents	Released: March 5, 2025; Label: Starchasers; Formats: digital download
Dr. Robotnik's Mean Bean Machine 2	Released: March 5, 2025; Label: Starchasers; Formats: digital download
Dr. Robotnik's Mean Bean Machine 2 Instrumentals	Released: March 5, 2025; Label: Starchasers; Formats: digital download
Jamaican Magic 2: Conquerah	Released: March 5, 2025; Label: Starchasers; Formats: digital download
Jamaican Magic 2: Conquerah Instrumentals	Released: March 5, 2025; Label: Starchasers; Formats: digital download
gowiththeflow Instrumentals	Released: March 13, 2025; Label: Starchasers; Formats: digital download
Intimacy	Released: March 13, 2025; Label: Starchasers; Formats: digital download
Intimacy Instroz	Released: March 13, 2025; Label: Starchasers; Formats: digital download
Katt Williams: Sex Tape	Released: March 13, 2025; Label: Starchasers; Formats: digital download
Mastery: How Times Flies	Released: March 13, 2025; Label: Starchasers; Formats: digital download
Please To Make Your Acquaintance	Released: March 13, 2025; Label: Starchasers; Formats: digital download
Mastery Pt. 2: The Hate Album	Released: March 25, 2025; Label: Starchasers; Formats: digital download
Waft Dunk	Released: March 25, 2025; Label: Starchasers; Formats: digital download
Waft Dunk Instrumentals	Released: March 25, 2025; Label: Starchasers; Formats: digital download
Who Do VooDoo	Released: March 25, 2025; Label: Starchasers; Formats: digital download
Who Do VooDoo Instrumentals	Released: March 25, 2025; Label: Starchasers; Formats: digital download
The Voodoo Vibe Lounge	Released: April 2, 2025; Label: Starchasers; Formats: digital download
The Voodoo Vibe Lounge Instrumentals	Released: April 2, 2025; Label: Starchasers; Formats: digital download
Karate Wheels	Released: April 4, 2025; Label: Starchasers; Formats: digital download
Jamaican Magic 3: Progress In Work Instrumentals	Released: April 17, 2025; Label: Starchasers; Formats: digital download
Muscle Cars In Traffic Instroz	Released: April 17, 2025; Label: Starchasers; Formats: digital download
Noise In Nirvana Instroz	Released: April 17, 2025; Label: Starchasers; Formats: digital download
LiveFromNewYork	Released: April 22, 2025; Label: Starchasers; Formats: digital download
Pariah Instrumentals	Released: April 25, 2025; Label: Starchasers; Formats: digital download
Pariah	Released: April 25, 2025; Label: Starchasers; Formats: digital download
Jamaican Magic 3: Progress In Work	Released: April 26, 2025; Label: Starchasers; Formats: digital download
Natural Causes	Released: May 17, 2025; Label: Starchasers; Formats: digital download
The Bipolar Sunshine	Released: June 20, 2025; Label: Starchasers; Formats: digital download
The Bipolar Sunshine Instrumnetals	Released: June 20, 2025; Label: Starchasers; Formats: digital download
Adrenaline	Released: August 5, 2025; Label: Starchasers; Formats: digital download
Adrenaline Items	Released: August 5, 2025; Label: Starchasers; Formats: digital download
Failure To Comply	Released: August 5, 2025; Label: Starchasers; Formats: digital download
Failure To Comply Items	Released: August 5, 2025; Label: Starchasers; Formats: digital download
Out Of My League (Hosted by DJ Enjetic)	Released: August 5, 2025; Label: Starchasers; Formats: digital download
Super Charles Hamilton's Underworld	Released: August 15, 2025; Label: Starchasers; Formats: digital download
Supersonic	Released: August 17, 2025; Label: Starchasers; Formats: digital download
Supersonic Items	Released: August 17, 2025; Label: Starchasers; Formats: digital download
Slave	Released: August 28, 2025; Label: Starchasers; Formats: digital download
Slave Items	Released: August 28, 2025; Label: Starchasers; Formats: digital download
Embers	Released: September 25, 2025; Label: Starchasers; Formats: digital download
Evil Deliverance Instrumentals	Released: September 25, 2025; Label: Starchasers; Formats: digital download
God Mode	Released: September 25, 2025; Label: Starchasers; Formats: digital download
God Mode Instrumentals	Released: September 25, 2025; Label: Starchasers; Formats: digital download
M4stery	Released: September 25, 2025; Label: Starchasers; Formats: digital download
Never Woulda Made It	Released: September 25, 2025; Label: Starchasers; Formats: digital download
Never Woulda Made It (The EP)	Released: September 25, 2025; Label: Starchasers; Formats: digital download
The 3rd Testament (a Mastery)	Released: September 25, 2025; Label: Starchasers; Formats: digital download
The Goth Who Sat By The Door	Released: October 2, 2025; Label: Starchasers; Formats: digital download
The Goth Who Sat By The Door Instrumentals	Released: October 2, 2025; Label: Starchasers; Formats: digital download
The New York Slave Trade	Released: October 28, 2025; Label: Starchasers; Formats: digital download
Gospel Joints	Released: January 7, 2026; Label: Starchasers; Formats: digital download
Power-Ups (Instrumentals)	Released: January 7, 2026; Label: Starchasers; Formats: digital download
Gypsy Circus Items	Released: January 7, 2026; Label: Starchasers; Formats: digital download
Midseason Frets	Released: May 8, 2026; Label: Starchasers; Formats: digital download
The Bipolar Sunshine 2: Jackie's Song	Released: September 26, 2026; Label: Starchasers; Formats: digital download
T.H.E. (The Hamilton Experience)	Released: TBA, 2026; Label: Starchasers; Formats: digital download, Streaming

=== Miscellaneous ===
List of miscellaneous albums, with selected information
Title	Album details
"This Perfect Life"^{[E]}	Recorded: 2009; Released: 24 September 2009; Re-released: 4 July, 2025; Label: Demevolist, Interscope; Format: Bootleg, digital download, Streaming
T.A.F.I.E.T.U.^{[A]}	Recorded: 2009; Released: 12 August 2010; Label: NewCo; Formats: Bootleg, digital download
Grow Wing Pains^{[B]}	Recorded: 2010; Released: 14 August 2010; Label: NewCo; Formats: Bootleg, digital download
Substance Abuse^{[F]}	Recorded: 2008; Released: 18 April 2013; Re-released: 4 July, 2025; Label: Demevolist, Interscope; Format: Bootleg, digital download, Streaming
My Heart^{[G]}	Recorded: 2010; Released: 30 May 2014; Label: NewCo; Format: Bootleg, digital download
The Zone^{[H]}	Recorded: 2008; Released: 30 May 2014; Label: Demevolist; Format: Bootleg, digital download

== Singles ==
=== As lead artist ===
List of singles, with selected chart positions, showing year released and album name
Title	Year	Peak chart positions		Album
Title	Year	US R&B/HH	UK	Album
"Brooklyn Girls"	2008	97	—	Outside Looking
"Gauchos"	2010	—	—	My Heart
"Paperboy" (featuring B.o.B)	2010	—	—	non-album single
"New York Raining" (featuring Rita Ora)	2015	—	29	Empire: Original Soundtrack from Season 1
"—" denotes a single that did not chart or was not released in that territory.

== Music videos ==
Year	Song	Album	Director
2008	November 10	Outside Looking	Matt Alonzo
2008	Brooklyn Girls	Outside Looking	Matt Alonzo
2009	Loser	The Pink Lavalamp	Travis Satten
2009	Word? Aight	—N/a	
2012	MindTorture (Hotel Talk)	The Soul of Charles Hamilton	
2015	New York Raining	The Black Box	Max & Dania
2015	Down The Line	The Black Box	Dano Cerny
2016	FUNK vs INSTINCT (with C. Young as 3rd Eye Magic)	3rd Eye Magic: ABRACADABRA	
2019	Ralph Nader	Chronometry	MK Allen

== Guest appearances ==
List of non-single guest appearances, with other performing artists, showing year released and album name
Title	Year	Other artist(s)	Album
"Change Gonna Come"	2008	B.o.B, Asher Roth	—N/a
"Now I'm Back"	2009	Show TuFli	The Show
"Sega Police"	2009	H2 (HeroHalo)	—N/a
"Fool For Love"	2010	B.o.B	May 25th
"Make Believe"	2010	Woody, XV	LoveLife
"My Love Letter"	2010	David Blaine	Mr. Oxymoron
"All I Can Say"	2010	Cybes	Mindful Living
"U Stream"	2011	Adrian Bravo	—N/a
"Talk Show"	2011	Show TuFli	WestHarlemSwaggerifikMercedesCruisinMusik
"Scorpion"	2011	Killa T	Killas Instinct
"Satellite"	2011	Leo Light	Communication Problems
"Twitter Me Baby"	2012	AJ Royale	—N/a
"Stove To The Oven"	2012	Boemklatsch	—N/a
"Lost MauSe Work"	2012	Mickey Factz, Cory Gunz	Mickey MauSe
"Alright"	2014	Ben Jayne, Corpy	Ben Jayne Paris
"Less Is More"	2014	Gleams	The Pregame
"8 Bit Dreams"	2015	Mickey Factz, Nikki Jean	Y-3
"Moneys"	2016	Casper & B., Michael Christmas	Low Battery Summer
"Dance"	2025	Blu, August Fanon	Dance

== Production credits ==
=== 2008 ===
Charles Hamilton - Brooklyn Girls (single)

1. "Brooklyn Girls" (Sample Credit: K.P. & Envyi - "Swing My Way")

Charles Hamilton - American Gangsta: Who Is Charles Hamilton? (mixtape)

1. "Coming Around" (Sample Credit: Pharoahe Monch - "Desire")
2. "Awesome"
3. "Punk Rock Boy in the Hood" (Sample Credit: Jay Z - "Roc Boys")
4. "Going Ignorant" (Sample Credit: The Isley Brothers - "No Footsteps In The Dark")
5. "The American Dream" (Sample Credit: Jay Z - "American Gangsta")
6. "Pink Magic (interlude)" (Sample Credit: Jay Z - "Blue Magic")
7. "Pressure? What Pressure?"
8. "Bettlejuice" (Sample Credit: Jadakiss - "Checkmate")
9. "PWA (Problem With Authority)" (Sample Credit: 50 Cent - "Amusement Park")
10. "The Gangsta's Final Clip"

Charles Hamilton - And Then They Played Dilla (mixtape)

1. "Coming Around" (Sample Credit: Slum Village - "Players")
2. "Owww" (Sample Credit: J Dilla - "Airworks")
3. "Convincedindecision" (Sample Credit: J Dilla - "U-Luv")
4. "Waterworks" (Sample Credit: J Dilla - "Don't Cry")
5. "Krispy Kreme Intentions" (Sample Credit: J Dilla - "Walkinonit")
6. "Bermuda Triangle" (Sample Credit: J Dilla - "Glazed")
7. "Losing Control, Revisited" (Sample Credit: J Dilla - "One Eleven")
8. "What's Going On" (Sample Credit: J Dilla - "Anti-American Graffiti")

Demevolist Music Group - Staff Development (mixtape)

1. "Intro/JetBlue" (with Sha-Leik) - (Performed by Charles Hamilton) - (Sample Credit: Marvin Gaye - "Flyin' High (In The Friendly Sky)")
2. "Rock The Joint" (Performed by J Means)
3. "High" (Performed by I.S.A.) - (Sample Credit: The Jones Girls - "Who Can I Run To")
4. "Air Conditioner" (with Sha-Leik) - (Performed by Charless Hamilton) - (Sample Credit: IMx - "Beautiful (You Are)")
5. "Brief Intermission" (Performed by Bagdad) - (Sample Credit: Zombie Nation - "Kernkraft 400")
6. "Anti-Bullying Zone" (Performed by Charles Hamilton) - (Sample Credit: Tori Amos - "Caught a Light Sneeze")
7. "Brazilian Crying Season" (with Sha-Leik) - (Performed by Charles Hamilton) - (Sample Credit: Tamia - "Rain On Me")
8. "Ronald McDonald" (with Sha-Leik) - (Performed by Charles Hamilton) - (Sample Credit: Womack and Womack - "Baby I'm Scared of You")
9. "Party Of Five" (with Sha-Leik) - (Performed by Charles Hamilton) - (Sample Credit: Keyshia Cole - "Fallin' Out")
10. "Alone" (Performed by I.S.A. and Charles Hamilton) - (Sample Credit: Enchantment - "It's You That I Need")
11. "The Butterfly Effect" (with Sha-Leik) - (Performed by Charles Hamilton) - (Sample Credit: India Arie - "Ready For Love")
12. "Float On" (Performed by Yung Nate)
13. "Ralph Lauren" (Performed by SHow TuFli)
14. "Nah Dead Ass" (Performed by Charles Hamilton) - (Sample Credit: Paul Simon - "50 Ways To Leave Your Lover")
15. "Mt. Rushmore" (Performed by Charles Hamilton, HcHo and St. Vil) - (Sample Credit: Michael Jackson - "When I Come Of Age")

Charles Hamilton - It's Charles Hamilton (mixtape)

1. "It's" (Sample Credit: Fuzzy Haskins - "Cookie Jar")
2. "Conversations with God" (Sample Credit: The Isley Brothers - "Just Came Here to Chill")
3. "Starchasers" (Sample Credit: Lykke Li - "My Love")
4. "Emotional Distress" (Sample Credit: Luther Vandross - "Don't You Know") - (Sample Credit: 112 - "Hold Me")
5. "Mr. Perfect" (Sample Credit: Hoobastank - "The Reason")
6. "Wrong Side of the Bed" (Sample Credit: The-Dream - "I Luv Your Girl")
7. "The Honeymoon's Over" (Sample Credit: Player - "Baby Come Back")
8. "Lacy Duvalle" (Sample Credit: Lovin Spoonful - "Daydream")
9. "Niño De Infiernos (Hell Boys)" (Sample Credit: The Clash - "Straight to Hell")
10. "Negative Zero"
11. "Wonder" (Sample Credit: Incubus - "Dig")
12. "Sunday Morning Testimonial" (Sample Credit: Lupe Fiasco - "Hip-Hop Saved My Life")
13. "I'm Good (Bret Hart)" (Sample Credit: Labi Siffre - "I Got The...")

Charles Hamilton - The L Word (mixtape)

1. "Ring Around The Rosey" (Sample Credit: Portrait - "Here We Go Again")
2. "Body Telepathy" (Sample Credit: R. Kelly - "Your Body's Calling Me")
3. "Sweetheart (Take It Back)" (Sample Credit: Rob Thomas - "Lonely NO More")
4. "Theories Of Wine" (Sample Credit: The Outfield - "Your Love")
5. "DSW" (Sample Credit: D'Angelo - "Feel Like Making Love")
6. "Maybelline" (Sample Credit: Björk - "It's Not Up TO You")
7. "Wishbones, Horseshoes, and Basketball" (Sample Credit: Wayne Wonder - "No Letting Go")
8. "Novelty" (Sample Credit: Atlantic Starr - "When Love Calls")
9. "Pre-Prenup" (Sample Credit: The Isley Brothers - "Hello Its Me")
10. "Women Hate Women (Lady Luck)" (Sample Credit: Sydney Sweeney - "Haters")

Charles Hamilton - StH (Sonic The Hamilton) (mixtape)

1. "Enter The Hedgehog" (Sample Credit: Sonic The Hedgehog - "Aquatic Base (Level 1)")
2. "Wheres My Fcking Genesis" (Sample Credit: Sonic The Hedgehog - "Mystic Ruins")
3. "10 Minutes" (Sample Credit: Sonic The Hedgehog - "Casino Night Zone")
4. "Put Cash Up" (Sample Credit: Sonic The Hedgehog - "Casino Night Zone")
5. "Ringtone Rap" (Sample Credit: Lil Flip - "Gameover") - (Sample Credit: Beyonce - "Single Ladies (Put A Ring On It)")
6. "Two Left Feet (Swaggerless Swag)" (Sample Credit: Genesis - "I Can't Dance")
7. "Frustration and Failed Suicide Attempts"
8. "Stir of Echoes or Sleeping Beauty" (Sample Credit: Incubus - "Echo")
9. "baby sonic" (Sample Credit: John Mellencamp - "Jack and Diane")
10. "Lemme Know" (Sample Credit: Rihanna - "Shut Up and Drive")
11. "Supersonicvents" (Sample Credit: Sonic The Hedgehog - "Final Boss")
12. "Happy Ending" (Sample Credit: Imogen Heap - "Have You Got In You?")
13. "Fans Are Cool" (Sample Credit: Modest Mouse - "")
14. "11 11 Again"
15. "Captain Slave a Hedgehog"

Charles Hamilton - Intervention (mixtape)

1. "Weirdo" (Sample Credit: Tracie Spencer - "Players") - (Sample Credit: Groove Armada - "Vertigo")
2. "Verbal Vicodin" (Sample Credit: The Police - "Message in A Bottle")
3. "Tinkerbelle" (Sample Credit: Tracie Spencer - "Tender Kisses")
4. "C-Food" (Sample Credit: Family Guy - "Rock Lobster")
5. "Jeezy Hamilton" (Sample Credit: Young Jeezy - "Put On")
6. "Free Incoming" (Sample Credit: Michael Franks - "When Sly Calls (Don't Touch That Phone)")
7. "Honesty Box" (Sample Credit: Faith Evans - "I Love You")
8. "Chivalry" (Sample Credit: Britney Spears - "Womanizer")
9. "Delivery or DiGiorno's" (Sample Credit: Beyonce - "Me, Myself and I")
10. "11:59 PM (Pretty Memories)" (Sample Credit: Mary J. Blige - "I Love You")
11. "Charlie's Angels" (Sample Credit: Jon B. - "They Don't Know")
12. "Jesus For A Day" (Sample Credit: Macy Gray - "Jesus For A Day")
13. "Bruce Almighty (Moon Outta The Sky)" (Sample Credit: Delfonics - "Walk Right Up To The Sun")
14. "Supernatural Vacation" (Sample Credit: Samurai Champloo - "Shiki No Uta")
15. "Desperate Tears Of Certainty" (Sample Credit: Delfonics - "Walk Right Up To The Sun")

Charles Hamilton - The Pink Lavalamp

1. "Music (Intro)" (Sample Credit: Graham Central Station - "Today")
2. "Loser" (Sample Credit: The Stylistics - "One Night Affair")
3. "She's So High" (Sample Credit: Telepopmusik - "Breathe")
4. "Voices" (Sample Credit: The Spinners - "It's A Shame")
5. "Let Me Live" (Sample Credit: Diana Ross - "Love Hangover")
6. "Brighter Days" (Sample Credit: Ronnie Laws - "Friends And Strangers")
7. "The Cookout" (Sample Credit: Parliament - "Mothership Connection (Star Child)")
8. "Sat(t)elite" (Sample Credit: Shelby Lynne - "I Only Want To Be With You")
9. "Live Life to the Fullest" (Sample Credit: The Jacksons - "Heart Break Hotel")
10. "Come Back to You" (Sample Credit: The Isley Brothers - "Voyage To Atlantis")
11. "Shinin'" (Sample Credit: Maze - "Golden Time of Day")
12. "I’ll Be Around (Outro)" (Sample Credit: The Spinners - "I’ll Be Around")
13. "Writing in the Sky" (Sample Credit: The Stylistics - "Betcha By Golly, Wow")
14. "Boy Who Cried Wolf" (Sample Credit: Joe Simon - "You Don't Want To Believe It")

=== 2009 ===
Charles Hamilton - Well Isn't This Awkward (mixtape)

1. "Cinematic Hallucinations (Intro)" (Sample Credit: Maroon 5 - "She Will Be Loved")
2. "Scorpion" (Sample Credit: Raphael Saadiq - "Be Here")
3. "Neverland" (Sample Credit: Rihanna - "Willing To Wait")
4. "Romantic Vents" (Sample Credit: Rihanna - "Say It")
5. "Re-Anna" (Sample Credit: Fleetwood Mac - "Rhiannon")
6. "Match.com (Commercial Break)" (Sample Credit: Carl Thomas - "I Wish)
7. "You Too" (Sample Credit: Rihanna - "Rehab")
8. "Tengo Una Pregunta" (Sample Credit: Rihanna - "Question Existing")
9. "Psycho Bitch" (Sample Credit: Rihanna- "Disturbia")
10. "The Penthouse Elevator" (Sample Credit: Chris Brown - "Ain't No Way (You Won't Love Me) ")
11. "In Case It Doesn't Work Out" (Sample Credit: Alicia Myers - "I Want To Thank You")
12. "In Case I Actually Get Her" (Sample Credit: Rihanna - "P.S. (I's Still Not Over You)")

Charles Hamilton - My Brain Is Alive (mixtape)

1. "Pleasant Overthinking" (Sample Credit: Mos Def - "The Panties")
2. "High School Reunion Collide A Scope" (Sample Credit: Ace of Base - "I Saw The Sign")
3. "Grounded For Life" (Sample Credit: Incubus - "Sick Sad Little World")
4. "Ignore Ant" (Sample Credit: Prince Paul - "A Prince Among Thieves")
5. "Cali Oriental" (Sample Credit: Madonna - "I'm Not Sorry")
6. "Talent Entrance"
7. "An Angel's Anneurism (Pleasant Overthinging Pt. 2)" (Sample Credit: Tom Brock - "I Love You More And More")
8. "Reminder"
9. "Truth Kills Opposition (Love TKO)" (Sample Credit: Teddy Pendergrass - "Love T.K.O.")
10. "Every Now And Then" (Sample Credit: Jill Scott - "Crossed My Mind")
11. "Based On Feeling" (Sample Credit: The Cars - "Just What I Needed")
12. "Freshman Orientation" (Sample Credit: The Jackson 5 - "It's Great To Be Hered")
13. "Get On The Bandwagon" (Sample Credit: Big Pun - "My Dick")
14. "Something" (Sample Credit: Goo Goo Dolls - "Long Way Down")
15. "Cold Chillin'" (Sample Credit: Tom Brock - "I Love You More And More")

Charles Hamilton - Every Charles Hamilton Ex-Girlfriend's Worst Nightmare (mixtape)

1. "TheVinylPop"
2. "Esperanza, Keishana and Keana" (Sample Credit: Kanye West - "Love Lockdown")
3. "Shayna, Tiffany and Summer" (Sample Credit: Kanye West - "Heartless")
4. "Toya" (Sample Credit: Kanye West - "Amazing")
5. "Shantel" (Sample Credit: Kanye West - "Welcome to Heartbreak")
6. "Jenniea, Jamarris and Tricia" (Sample Credit: Kanye West - "Coldest Winter")
7. "Brittany" (Sample Credit: Kanye West - "Say You Will")
8. "Simone" (Sample Credit: Kanye West - "Paranoid")
9. "Bitter Ex" (Sample Credit: Kanye West - "Pinocchio Story")

Charles Hamilton - The Dead Zone (mixtape)

1. " The Dead Zone Intro"
2. "Rachel's Place" (Sample Credit: Family Matters - "Interlude Theme")
3. "Homophobia" (Sample Credit: The Boondocks - "Outro Theme")
4. "NotGuilty" (Sample Credit: Womack and Womack - "It’s Woman")
5. "StrangersWithCandy"
6. "TheShruggingShoulders"
7. "But Me Made This Song"
8. "124th and Broadway"
9. "Twilight" (Sample Credit: Paramore - "Decode")
10. "Outro Intro To Somewhere"
11. "Don't Even Care" (Sample Credit: The Smashing Pumpkins - "1979")
12. "West Side Drive"

Charles Hamilton - "This Perfect Life"

1. "Barbara Walters" (Sample Credit: The Shadows - "Geronimo")
2. "Three Pound Bullet" (Sample Credit: Chicago - "Street Player")
3. "Ghosts" (Sample Credit: Suzanne Vega - "Tom's Diner")
4. "Post-Lynching Ceremony" (Sample Credit: John Barry - "The Persuaders! Theme")
5. "All Alone"
6. "Cable in the Classroom" (Sample Credit: Luther Ingram - "To the Other Man" & J Dilla - "Gobstopper" )
7. "Baby" (Sample Credit: Zodiac - "Super Sonic")
8. "Reminder"
9. "Tears of Fire (feat. KXNG Crooked)" (Sample Credit: Jennifer Rush - "I Come Undone")
10. "Long Socks (feat. SHow "Tails" TuFli)" (Sample Credit: PJ Harvey - "The Mess We're In")
11. "Rosado" (Sample Credit: Sade - "Kiss of Life")

Charles Hamilton - Normalcy

1. "New Music From Charles Hamilton"
2. "Enter The Scope" (Sample Credit: Gloria Gaynor - "I Will Survive")
3. "WorkinInTheLab"
4. "Coodies" (Sample Credit: Sister Sledge - "He's the Greatest Dancer")
5. "August Rush"
6. "Air Agains"
7. "Loserville"
8. "She's Purrty" (Sample Credit: Miami Sound Machine - "Bad Boy")
9. "Laptop Therapy" (Sample Credit: The Ozark Mountain Daredevils - "Jackie Blue")
10. "Suicides"
11. "Baby Says I Want" (Sample Credit: Gene Loves Jezebel - "Desire")
12. "See & Say"
13. "20Hamil10"

=== 2010 ===
Charles Hamilton - 10 Things I Hate About Me (mixtape)

1. "I Am More Concerned With Love Than Life (Multi-Player Love)" (Sample Credit: Fleetwood Mac - "Dreams")
2. "I Hate Being Categorized (Mosh Pit Barbie)" (Sample Credit: Aqua - "Barbie Girl")
3. "Im Moody (Rox)"
4. "Overall, I'm A Nerd (Trekkie Girl)" (Sample Credit: N.E.R.D. - "Fly our Die")
5. "I Can't Sing (Sweets)" (Sample Credit: Chaka Khan - "Sweet Thing")
6. "I Talk To Myself Alot (Inner Discussion)" (Sample Credit: Jimi Hendrix - "Along The WatchTower")
7. "EEWT" (Sample Credit: Yeah Yeah Yeahs - "Maps")
8. "I Jump The Gun Too Often (Q & A)" (Sample Credit: Ozzy Osbourne - "The Almighty Dollar")
9. "I Dont Understand The Value Of Money (Tips)"
10. "I Watch Alot Of Cnn (Gloves)"

Charles Hamilton - T.A.F.I.E.T.U (The Album For Interscope Executives To Understand)

1. "3rd and Goal" (Sample Credit: Gary Glitter - "Rock & Roll Part 2")
2. "Free Will" (Sample Credit: Culture Club - "Do You Really Want to Hurt Me")
3. "Laffy-Taffy Outro (Anti-Hater Zone)" (Sample Credit: Corey Hart - "Sunglasses at Night")
4. "Stones On The Dancefloor" (Sample Credit: Audioslave - "Like a Stone")
5. "Telemundo" (Sample Credit: Tito Nieves - "I Like It Like That")
6. "The Loser's Revenge" (Sample Credit: The Stylistics - "One Night Affair")
7. "The North Pole" (Sample Credit: The Gap Band - "Outstanding")
8. "The Right Kind Of Brownies"
9. "This Is Cheating"
10. "Webster's"

Charles Hamilton - Grow Wing Pains

1. "Some First Single Type Sh1t" (Sample Credit: Taking Back Sunday - "A Decade Under The Influence")
2. "More C Food" (Sample Credit: Family Guy - "Rock Lobster")
3. "Two Straws One Cup" (Sample Credit: Robin Thicke - "Lost Without U")
4. "Home Alone" (Sample Credit: LV - "How Long Has It Been")
5. "Twittering About Masturbation" (Sample Credit: Britney Spears - "Circus")
6. "Selective Deafness" (Sample Credit: Chevelle - "The Red")
7. "Advice From A Sunbeam" (Sample Credit: Maze - "Joy and Pain")
8. "SomeoneToTalkTo" (Sample Credit: Timothy McNealy - "Sagittarius Black")
9. "Tax Evasion" (Sample Credit: Air - "Surfing on a Rocket")
10. "Miss Stress" (Sample Credit: The Isley Brothers - "Make Me Say It Again")
11. "In-Flight Music" (Sample Credit: Dilated Peoples - "The Platform")
12. "Coming Attractions" (Sample Credit: Bachman–Turner Overdrive - "Bachman Turner Overdrive")
13. "In-Flight Music"
14. "Coming Attractions"

=== 2011 ===
Mickey Factz - Letter To Sonic (single)

1. "Letter To Sonic"

Charles Hamilton - Attempt At Swag (mixtape)

1. "(Not) Disses" (Sample Credit: Keith Sweat - "Make It Last Forever")
2. "U B Y I C"
3. "(All) SNL" (Sample Credit: Cassie - "Kiss Me")
4. "(Do) Break Ups"
5. "(Swagger) Outside Pt. 2 (Fedora Music in the Lobby)"
6. "(At) Photoshop" (Sample Credit: Brandy & Monica - "The Boy Is Mine")
7. "(Have) Midget Mobile" (Sample Credit: A Taste of Honey - "Boogie Oogie Oogie")
8. "(Any) November 10th 2009" (Sample Credit: Jeremih - "Birthday Sex")

Charles Hamilton - Sober Karaoke (mixtape)

1. "Hi! What is Sober Karaoke" (Sample Credit: The Talented Mr Hamilton - "Garbage Rapper")
2. "Pretty In Pink" (Sample Credit: The Pink Panther Theme Song)
3. "Anger Management"
4. "The Project Stairwell"
5. "I Hate You, Charles-Hamilton" (Sample Credit: Cher - "If I Could Turn Back Time")
6. "Till Last Summer" (Sample Credit: Tony Toni Tone - "Till Last Summer")
7. "On Some G ****"
8. "Rebecca's Addiction" (Sample Credit: Henry Mancini - "Theme From "Love Story")
9. "Friendship Bracelet" (Sample Credit: Cyndi Lauper - "Time After Time")
10. "Charles in Charge" (Sample Credit: Shandi Sinnamon - "Charles in Charge")
11. "Tarissa's Song v2.0" (Sample Credit: Wayne Wonder - "Saddest Day of My Life")
12. "Karen Song 3.1" (Sample Credit: The Cardigans - "Lovefool")
13. "See Ya Later!" (Sample Credit: Incubus - "Are You In?")
14. "Rain Man 2" (Sample Credit: Eminem - "Rain Man")

=== 2013 ===
Charles Hamilton - Substance Abuse

1. "Intro (Welcome to Psychosis)"
2. "Keep It Up"
3. "Hell Yes" (Sample Credit: Usher - "How Do I Say")
4. "Where I've Been" (Sample Credit: Bobby Caldwell - "What You Wont Do For Love")
5. "Concubine"
6. "Press C"
7. "Return To Sender (Pink Within)" (Sample Credit: Chicago - "If You Leave Me Now")
8. "Go Amy (Amy's Rose)"
9. "Hard (Live From C. Hamilton's Place)"
10. "The Desired Answer (Say Yes)" (with Sha-Leik) - (Sample Credit: Avant - "Don't Say No, Just Say Yes")
11. "I Hate Parties"
12. "I Don't Care" (with Eminem)
13. "Monday Mornings"
14. "Disambiguation" (Sample Credit: Helicopter Girl - "Umbrellas In The Rain ")
15. "No Title" (Sample Credit: Gary Wright - "Dream Weaver")
16. "Outro (As The Music Dies)" (Sample Credit: George Michael - "Careless Whisper")

=== 2014 ===
Charles Hamilton - My Heart

1. "All Alone"
2. "Sega Music (Last Of The Mauratians)"
3. "Speak No Louder"
4. “Gauchos” (with Jim Jonsin)
5. "Make Me Beautiful (Halla)"
6. "Don't Download"
7. "After Tonight..."
8. "Marketing"
9. "Hyperspeed" (with Pharrell Williams)
10. "Shining Shadows"
11. "When I Rap"
12. "Choices (A Wave for Alex)"

Charles Hamilton - aware.

1. “Overachievers” (Sample Credit: Kanye West - On Sight)

=== 2015 ===
Various artist - Empire: Original Soundtrack from Season 1

1. "New York Raining" (with The Invisible Men)

Bishop Nehru - The Nehruvian EP (mixtape)

1. "You & I"

Charles Hamilton - The Black Box (EP)

1. "Face The Music" (with The Invisible Men)
2. "Crayola" (with [he Invisible Men)
3. "Lessons" (with The Invisible Men)
4. "Down The Line" (with The Invisible Men)

=== 2016 ===
Charles Hamilton - Hamilton, Charles

1. "Oh Well" (with The Invisible Men)
2. "Clowns" (with The Invisible Men)
3. "Everyone" (with The Invisible Men)
4. "Correct" (with The Invisible Men)
5. "Be with You" (with The Invisible Men)
6. "Make Yourself Over" (with The Invisible Men)
7. "Man's World" (with The Invisible Men)
8. "MVP" (with The Invisible Men)
9. "Only Christina Knows" (with The Invisible Men)
10. "Real Life" (with The Invisible Men)
11. "Stay There" (with The Invisible Men)
12. "Ugly Supermodel" (with The Invisible Men)
