= Brooklyn Girl =

Brooklyn Girl or Brooklyn Girls may refer to:

- Brooklyn Girl, (original title: La Fille de Brooklyn), novel by Guillaume Musso
- "Brooklyn Girls" (Charles Hamilton song), 2008 song
- "Brooklyn Girls" (Catey Shaw song), 2014 song
