= My Heart =

My Heart may refer to:

== Albums ==
- My Heart (Donell Jones album) or the title song, 1996
- My Heart (Doris Day album) or the title song, 2011
- My Heart (Lorrie Morgan album) or the title song, 1999
- My Heart (Sissel album), 2003
- My Heart, by Charles Hamilton, 2014
- My Heart, by Jevetta Steele, 2006
- My Heart, by Martina McBride, 2005

== Songs ==
- "My Heart" (Ronnie Milsap song), 1980
- "My Heart", by Gene Vincent, 1960
- "My Heart", by Jon Batiste from World Music Radio, 2023
- "My Heart", by Lizz Wright from The Orchard, 2008
- "My Heart", by Paramore from All We Know Is Falling, 2005
- "My Heart", by Toni Braxton from Sex & Cigarettes, 2018
- "My Heart (Intro)", by Christina Aguilera from Bionic, 2010
