= Empire: Original Soundtrack from Season 1 =

Soundtrack album by Various artists
- Released: March 10, 2015
- Genres: Hip hop; R&B; pop
- Length: 37:01; 59:52 (Deluxe)
- Label: Columbia
- Producers: Timbaland, Jim Beanz, Justin Bostwick, Raphael Saadiq, Jazze Pha, Tricky Stewart, Sharif "Reefa" Slater, Johnny Black, Charles Hamilton, The Invisible Men

Empire: Original Soundtrack from Season 1 is the debut soundtrack album by the cast of the musical drama television series Empire, which airs on Fox. The album includes songs that featured during the first season of the show, and performed by various artists. The album was released by Columbia Records. The soundtrack received positive critical reception and debuted at number one on the Billboard 200 chart in the United States. On September 11, 2015, another soundtrack titled Empire: The Complete Season 1 was released containing every song heard on the show that weren't included on the official soundtrack.

== Background ==
Empire was set to debut on January 7, 2015 on Fox. After finding his lead actors, the show's co-creator Lee Daniels was searching for a talented music producer. Since Daniels considered his music taste "outdated", he asked his children for advice. After being advised by his son and daughter to contact Timothy "Timbaland" Mosley, known for being responsible for many hits in the music industry, Daniels contacted Timbaland. Timbaland eventually agreed to join the Empire family and conducted a team of talented songwriters and music artists. Timbaland described his creative process as being based on "working close with the writers" to help him produce songs that are based on the character that's singing. Eventually, 12 songs were produced for the pilot, alone.

Following the show's success, Columbia Records announced that a soundtrack CD would be released on March 10, 2015.

== Promotion ==
Following the album's release, Jussie Smollett performed "Good Enough" on The Ellen Degeneres Show. Smollett was interviewed by Degeneres and used the opportunity to come out, receiving substantial media attention. Yazz and Smollett also performed "You're So Beautiful" on Good Morning America. During the 2015 Billboard Music Awards, Yazz, Smollett and Estelle performed two songs from the album. The cast embarked on a signing tour throughout the nation, as well.

== Critical response ==
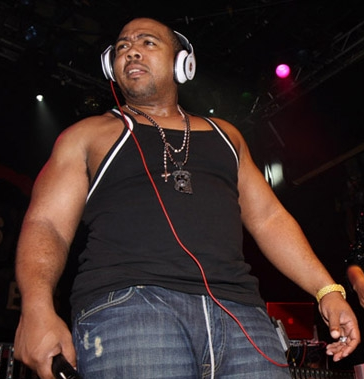
Timbaland's contributions were met with critical acclaim.

Metacritic gave the album an average score of 61%, indicating "generally favorable reviews" based on five critics. Critics praised Jussie Smollett's performance on the album, describing him as a "break out star". Entertainment Weekly's Kyle Anderson praised the CD's variation of genres stating "[the album] is at its best when it eschews goofy gangsta-isms like “Drip Drop” in favor of chest-thumping ballads or stirring hip-hop soul revivals". Further, he applauded Timbaland for "hold[ing] everything together". Pitchfork's Craig Jenkins admired the writer's effort given the fact that they had "to turn Dire Straits' "Money for Nothing" into swag rap and to feed Courtney Love a gospel choir" stating "there's nothing they won't try, and it's exhilarating". However, he expressed his distaste of the album's "celebrity collaborators" describing them as a "mixed bag".

Justin Charity from Complex Magazine thought the album's rap songs were "goofy as hell" and stated that "not even Mary J. Blige could save the Empire soundtrack". However he admitted that the songs were "catchy" and that the album overall "keeps a few true R&B greats on call for the love of musicality".

== Commercial performance ==
The album was a commercial success. In the United States, it debuted at number one on the Billboard 200, with 130,000 album-equivalent units, surpassing Madonna's thirteenth studio album Rebel Heart in a hotly contested week. Although "Rebel Heart" was the best selling album of the week, Empire came ahead in streaming. It sold 110,000 copies in its first week on sale. In January 2016, the album was certified Gold in the United States. The album also debuted at number 26 on the Canadian Albums Chart, with 1,300 copies. As of early 2017, the album has sold nearly 2,000,000 equivalent copies, helped by a Grammy nomination, several TV performances and constant reuse of its songs on the further seasons. Although, the other soundtracks haven't received similar promotion, obtaining lower commercial impact.

== Track listing ==
Empire: Original Soundtrack from Season 1 – Standard edition
No.	Title	Writer(s)	Performer(s)	Length
1.	"Good Enough"	Timothy Mosley, James Washington, Daniel Jones, Dwayne "Showtim3" Dyke Jr.	Jussie Smollett	3:50
2.	"What Is Love"	Mosley, Washington, Jones	V. Bozeman	2:53
3.	"No Apologies"	Mosley, Washington	Jussie Smollett and Yazz	2:52
4.	"Keep It Movin'"	Mosley, Washington	Serayah McNeill and Yazz	3:24
5.	"Walk Out on Me"	Aaron Wright, Sean Van Vleet	Courtney Love	3:25
6.	"Conqueror"	Jaramye Daniels, Kyle Henry, Angel Higgs, Claude Kelly, Akil C. King, Bailey Owens, Estelle Swaray	Estelle and Jussie Smollett	4:28
7.	"Remember the Music"	Mosley, Washington, Justin Bostwick, Jennifer Hudson	Jennifer Hudson	3:23
8.	"Shake Down"	Phalon Alexander, Mary J. Blige, Terius Nash, Christopher "Tricky" Stewart	Mary J. Blige and Terrence Howard	3:26
9.	"Power of the Empire"	Mosley, Washington, Dyke Jr.	Yazz	3:17
10.	"Nothing to Lose"	Mosley, Washington, Jones	Jussie Smollett, Terrence Howard	2:48
11.	"Whatever Makes You Happy"	Mosley, Washington, Goodlett, Jones, Hudson, Jordan Houston	Jennifer Hudson and Juicy J	3:15

Empire: Original Soundtrack from Season 1 – Deluxe edition
No.	Title	Writer(s)	Performer(s)	Length
1.	"Good Enough"	Timothy Mosley, James Washington, Daniel Jones	Jussie Smollett	3:50
2.	"What Is Love"	Mosley, Washington, Jones	V. Bozeman	2:53
3.	"No Apologies"	Mosley, Washington	Jussie Smollett and Yazz	2:52
4.	"Keep It Movin'"	Mosley, Washington	Serayah McNeill and Yazz	3:24
5.	"Keep Your Money"	Mosley, Washington	Jussie Smollett	2:29
6.	"Drip Drop"	Washington, Justin Bostwick, Thomas "Da Hitman" Goodlett	Yazz and Serayah McNeill	4:32
7.	"Can't Truss 'Em"	Mansa Wakili, Colton Fisher, Jason Rabinowitz, Jaron Lamot, Bill Matrix	Yazz	2:34
8.	"I Wanna Love You"	Jussie Smollett, David Michael Ott Jr.	Jussie Smollett	3:06
9.	"Money for Nothing"	Mark Knopfler, Sting	Jussie Smollett and Yazz	3:02
10.	"Walk Out on Me"	Aaron Wright, Sean Van Vleet	Courtney Love	3:25
11.	"You're So Beautiful"	Washington, Bostwick, Smollett	Jussie Smollett and Yazz	3:33
12.	"Conqueror"	Jaramye Daniels, Kyle Henry, Angel Higgs, Claude Kelly, Akil C. King, Bailey Owens, Estelle Swaray	Estelle and Jussie Smollett	4:28
13.	"Remember the Music"	Mosley, Washington, Bostwick, Jennifer Hudson	Jennifer Hudson	3:23
14.	"Shake Down"	Phalon Alexander, Mary J. Blige, Terius Nash, Christopher "Tricky" Stewart	Mary J. Blige and Terrence Howard	3:26
15.	"Power of the Empire"	Mosley, Washington	Yazz	3:17
16.	"Nothing to Lose"	Mosley, Washington, Jones	Jussie Smollett	2:48
17.	"Whatever Makes You Happy"	Mosley, Washington, Goodlett, Jones, Hudson, Jordan Houston	Jennifer Hudson and Juicy J	3:15
18.	"New York Raining"	Charles Hamilton, The Invisible Men, Laura White	Charles Hamilton and Rita Ora	3:35

Empire: Original Soundtrack from Season 1 – Super deluxe edition (bonus disc)
No.	Title	Performer(s)	Length
1.	"Lola"	Jussie Smollett	3:26
2.	"What the DJ Says"	Jussie Smollett and Yazz	3:02
3.	"Nothing But the Number"	Yazz and Naomi Campbell	3:09
4.	"Come Away With Me"	Jussie Smollett	3:44
5.	"For My God"	Jennifer Hudson	2:49
6.	"Nothing to Lose"	Terrance Howard & Jussie Smollet	3:00

Empire: The Complete Season 1
No.	Title	Performer(s)	Length
1.	"What Is Love"	V. Bozeman	1:28
2.	"Live in the Moment"	Jussie Smollett and Yazz	2:20
3.	"Good Enough"	Jussie Smollett	3:50
4.	"Right There"	Yazz	2:14
5.	"Armani"	Yazz	1:44
6.	"What the DJ Spins"	Terence Howard	1:59
7.	"Adios"	Serayah McNeill	3:39
8.	"Tell the Truth"	Jussie Smollett	3:51
9.	"No Apologies"	Jussie Smollett and Yazz	2:53
10.	"Up All Night" (Jamal's 2015 Version)	Jussie Smollett	2:40
11.	"Bad Girl"	Serayah McNeill and V. Bozeman	3:30
12.	"Hustle Hard"	Jim Beanz	2:10
13.	"Keep It Movin'"	Serayah McNeill and Yazz	3:21
14.	"Keep Your Money"	Jussie Smollett	2:29
15.	"Take Me to the River"	Courtney Love	3:31
16.	"Can't Trust 'Em"	Yazz	2:34
17.	"I Wanna Love You"	Jussie Smollett	3:06
18.	"Walk Out on Me"	Courtney Love	3:25
19.	"Money for Nothing"	Jussie Smollett and Yazz	3:02
20.	"Live in the Moment" (107 Edit)	Jussie Smollett and Yazz	2:09
21.	"You're So Beautiful" (90s Version)	Terrance Howard	3:59
22.	"You're So Beautiful"	Jussie Smollett and Yazz	3:33
23.	"You're So Beautiful" (White Party Version)	Jussie Smollett	3:49
24.	"Jay Jazz Plus One" (Instrumental)		2:37
25.	"War of the Roses"	Jim Beanz	3:16
26.	"All of the Above"	Jussie Smollett	3:41
27.	"Black & Blue"	V. Bozeman	2:41
28.	"Conqueror"	Estelle and Jussie Smollett	4:29
29.	"You're So Beautiful" (Full Cast Version)	Estelle, Terrence Howard, Jussie Smollett, Yazz and Serayah McNeill	2:45
30.	"Lola"	Jussie Smollett	3:26
31.	"Shake Down"	Mary J. Blige and Terrence Howard	3:26
32.	"Nothing But a Number"	Yazz and Naomi Campbell	3:09
33.	"Remember the Music"	Jennifer Hudson	3:23
34.	"Power of the Empire"	Yazz	3:17
35.	"Nothing to Lose"	Terrence Howard and Jussie Smollett	3:00
36.	"For My God"	Jennifer Hudson	2:49
37.	"Come Away With Me"	Jussie Smollett	3:44
38.	"Nothing to Lose"	Jussie Smollett	2:48
39.	"What the DJ Says"	Jussie Smollett and Yazz	3:15
40.	"Whatever Makes You Happy"	Jennifer Hudson and Juicy J	3:15
41.	"New York Raining"	Charles Hamilton and Rita Ora	3:35

== Charts ==
=== Weekly charts ===
Chart (2015)	Peak position
Australian Albums (ARIA)	31
Austrian Albums (Ö3 Austria)	11
Canadian Albums (Billboard)	25
French Albums (SNEP)	51
German Albums (Offizielle Top 100)	3
Irish Albums (IRMA)	61
Italian Albums (FIMI)	70
New Zealand Albums (RMNZ)	7
Scottish Albums (Official Charts)	30
Spanish Albums (Promusicae)	74
Swiss Albums (Schweizer Hitparade)	7
UK Albums (Official Charts)	18
UK Soundtrack Albums (OCC)	2
US Billboard 200	1
US Top R&B/Hip-Hop Albums (Billboard)	1
US Soundtrack Albums (Billboard)	1

=== Year-end charts ===
Chart (2015)	Position
US Billboard 200	37
US Top R&B/Hip-Hop Albums (Billboard)	9
US Soundtrack Albums (Billboard)	4
Chart (2016)	Position
US Top R&B/Hip-Hop Albums (Billboard)	93
US Soundtrack Albums (Billboard)	22
