= What My Mother Taught Me =

EP by Laura White
- Released: 10 November 2013
- Recorded: 2011–2013
- Genre: Pop, soul, jazz
- Length: 47:10
- Label: Dizzi Records
- Producer: Laura White

Laura White chronology
| What My Mother Taught Me (2013) | No. 95 (2016) |

What My Mother Taught Me is the debut EP by English singer-songwriter Laura White, who finished in eighth place on the fifth series of The X Factor in 2008. The four-track EP was released in the United Kingdom on 10 November 2013.

== Background and promotion ==
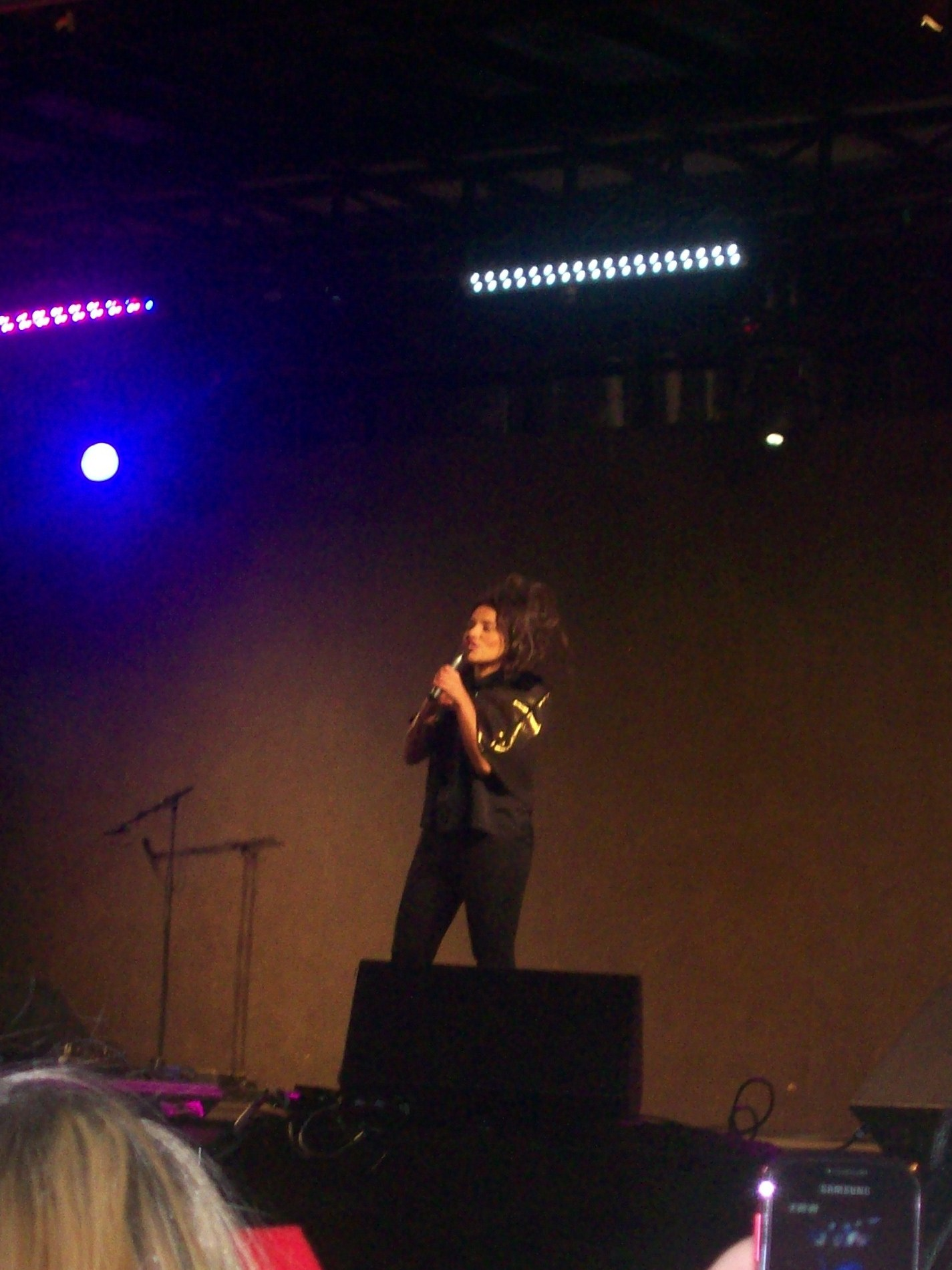
White performing live on 27 November 2011

In 2008, White competed in the fifth series of The X Factor. During the fifth week of the live shows, in a shock result, she was eliminated over Ruth Lorenzo. The Manchester Evening News reported on 11 November 2008 that White had been approached by an as-yet unnamed record company. White was chosen by Peterborough City Council to perform and turn on the annual Christmas lights at Cathedral Square in Peterborough. A crowd of 6,000 attended and cheered as the lights were turned on. White then went on to switch on the lights in the county capital Cambridge on the Sunday night. White was invited to the 2009 BRIT Awards Launch Party as The X Factor contestant representing the "Hero" single.

In early August 2009, White posted samples of four tracks onto her website. Fans were allowed to vote for one of the four to become her debut single. The candidates were: "You Should Have Known", "Touch You", "Got It Bad" and "Love Hurts". "You Should Have Known" was chosen as her debut single. The song was written by Ivor Novello-winning songwriter Michelle Escoffrey and produced by Ian Green, the man behind Madonna's autumn 2009 album Celebration. Speaking in October 2009 to noted UK R&B writer Pete Lewis of the award-winning Blues & Soul, White stated: "I'm really pleased to kick my whole album project off with 'You Should Have Known'. Because it's such a strong song, as well as being very different from the kind of straight-jazz thing everybody THOUGHT I was gonna do."

She performed her track "You Should Have Known" on GMTV on 19 August 2009. The video for the single "You Should Have Known" was shot in early September and was uploaded to White's official YouTube account. The single was released on 2 November 2009. To promote the single, White embarked on a promo tour of the UK. "You Should Have Known" debuted and peaked at number two on the UK Indie Singles Chart. White was also part of the alternative Haiti relief charity single "I Put a Spell on You". The track, which was released at the end of February 2010, includes other artists such as Shane MacGowan, Paloma Faith, Stereophonics, Primal Scream's Bobby Gillespie, Nick Cave and Johnny Depp. Laura was due to release a song titled "Radio" and told fans on the Peter Andre tour it would be her new single in the summer, although she later revealed on her Twitter account that the single had been scrapped due to her not being passionate enough about the song. In the studio, she worked with the likes of Ben Cullum (Jamie Cullum's brother), Professor Green and Ian Dench, allowing White to develop her sound profoundly for her album.

On 19 September 2013, it was announced that White would be releasing her debut EP, What My Mother Taught Me, on 10 November 2013. It reached number 22 on the Official Albums Chart and number one in the Singer/Songwriter charts.

== Track listing ==
1. "Come On Josephine" - 3:09
2. "Jimi Hendrix" - 3:40
3. "Rush Hour" - 3:02
4. "To Be Loved" - 4:30

== Release history ==
| Region | Date | Format |
|---|---|---|
| Ireland | 10 November 2013 | Digital download |
| United Kingdom | 10 November 2013 | Digital download |
