= The Pink Lavalamp (album) =

Studio album by Charles Hamilton
- Released: December 8, 2008
- Studio: Frederick Douglass Academy Music Lab (Harlem, New York)
- Genre: Hip hop
- Length: 70:18
- Label: Self-released

Charles Hamilton chronology
StH (Sonic The Hamilton) (2008)	The Pink Lavalamp (2008)	Hamilton, Charles (2016)

10 Year Anniversary reissue cover

The Pink Lavalamp is the debut studio album by American hip hop recording artist Charles Hamilton, released December 8, 2008, by Hamilton himself, due to disagreements with his former label, Interscope Records. It was produced entirely by Hamilton.

== Background ==
In August 2008, Charles Hamilton announced via interview that he had signed to Interscope Records. After beginning a series of mixtapes known as the Hamiltonization Process, Hamilton released his debut single "Brooklyn Girls" on November 11, 2008, which proved to be a hit. Hamilton was rumored to be recording his major-label debut and was under pressure from the label to include "Brooklyn Girls" on the album. He later disagreed with this idea and chose to release his debut effort independently. The album did not include new material and was actually recorded during Hamilton's notorious bout of homelessness in the recording studio of the Frederick Douglass Academy in Harlem, New York, which Charles and other members of Demevolist Music Group dubbed "The Lab".

== Music and lyrics ==
The Pink Lavalamp is an introspective, loose concept album detailing Hamilton's thoughts and emotions leading up to an attempted suicide. The production is rooted in soulful samples mixed with down-tempo grooves and draw influence from jazz, psychedelic funk, R&B, and rock. Lyrically, the album concerns themes of depression, substance abuse, infidelity, and individuality. It was the final project in the Hamiltonization Process.

== Critical reception ==
Jordan Rogowski of Punknews.org wrote that "Hamilton has created swirling, dynamic atmospheres that suit his clever bars to perfection".

== Track listing ==
- All tracks produced by Charles Hamilton

No.	Title	Length
1.	"Music (Intro)"	4:44
2.	"Loser"	4:46
3.	"She's So High"	4:32
4.	"Voices"	4:12
5.	"Boy Who Cried Wolf"	4:39
6.	"Let Me Live" (featuring Bagdad)	4:04
7.	"Brighter Days"	4:42
8.	"The Cookout"	4:33
9.	"Sat(t)elite"	4:07
10.	"Live Life to the Fullest" (featuring Yung Nate)	3:38
11.	"Come Back to You"	5:08
12.	"Latte"	4:41
13.	"Shinin'"	4:24
14.	"I'll Be Around (Outro)"	6:00
15.	"Writing in the Sky" (Bonus Track)	6:01
Total length:		70:18

Notes

- “Music” contains dialogue from the film Zoolander.
- "Voices" contains dialogue from the film The Usual Suspects.
- "Boy Who Cried Wolf" contains dialogue from the film EuroTrip.
- "Latte" interpolates "Closer" by Nine Inch Nails.

Sample credits

- "Music (Intro)" contains samples from "Today" by Graham Central Station and "Impeach The President" by The Honey Drippers.
- "She's So High" contains a sample from "Breathe", as performed by Télépopmusik featuring Angela McCluskey.
- "Voices" contains a sample of "It's A Shame", as performed by The Spinners.
- "Let Me Live" contains a sample of "Love Hangover", as performed by Diana Ross.
- "Brighter Days" contains a sample of "Friends & Strangers", as performed by Ronnie Laws.
- "The Cookout" contains a sample of "Mothership Connection (Star Child)", as performed by Parliament.
- "Live Life to the Fullest" contains a sample of "This Place Hotel (Heartbreak Hotel)", as performed by The Jacksons.
- "Come Back to You" contains a sample of "Voyage to Atlantis", as performed by The Isley Brothers.
- "Shinin'" contains a sample of "Golden Time of Day", as performed by Maze featuring Frankie Beverly.
- "I'll Be Around (Outro)" contains a sample of "I'll Be Around" by The Spinners.
