= Catey Shaw =

American singer-songwriter

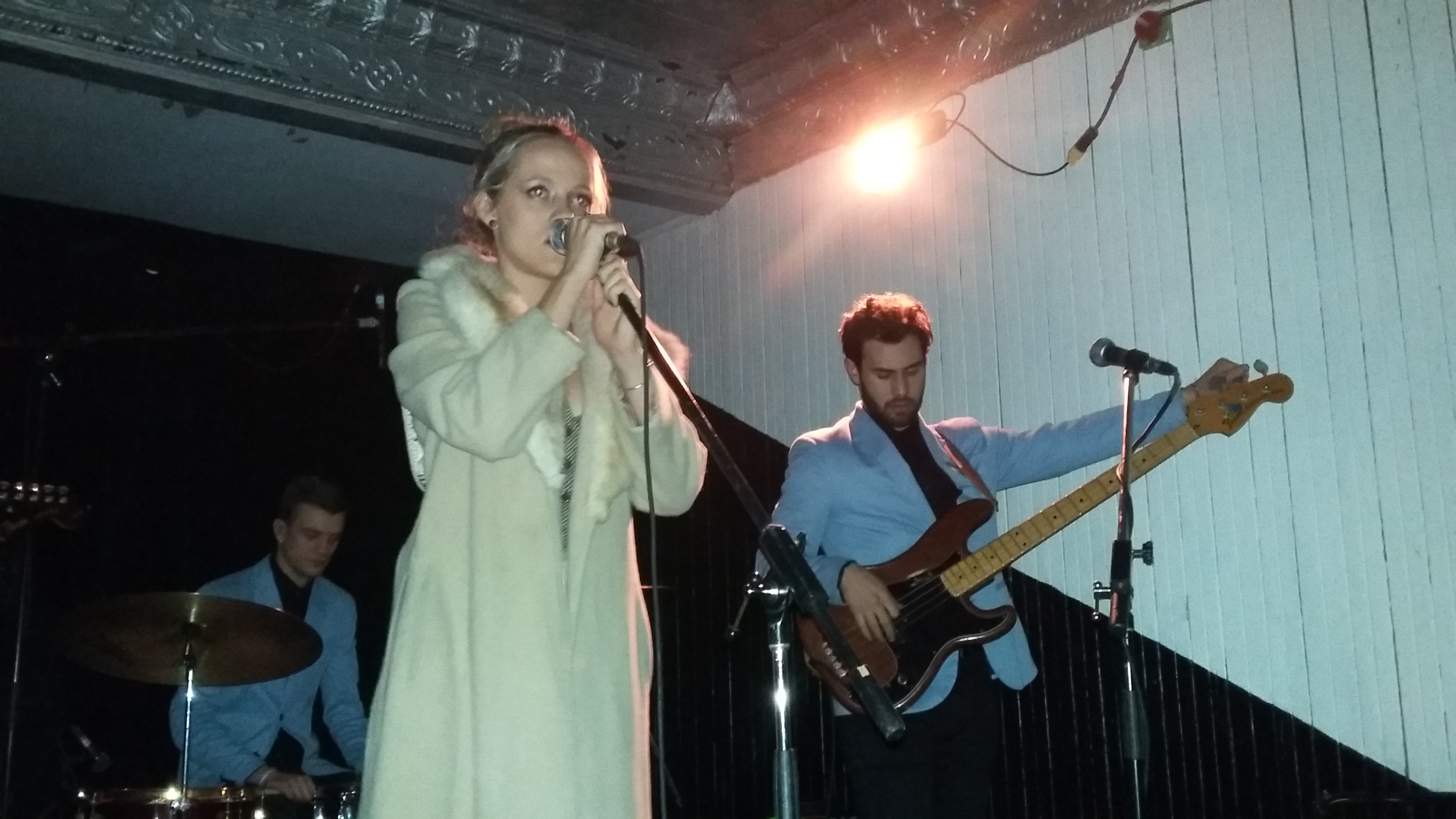
- Catey Shaw inside the venue Casa Del Popolo

Background information
- Born: Catherine Elizabeth Shaw; April 2, 1991 (age 35); Virginia Beach, Virginia, U.S.
- Origin: Brooklyn, New York, U.S.
- Genres: Pop; doo-wop; blue-eyed soul
- Occupations: Singer-songwriter, musician, producer
- Instruments: Vocals, ukulele
- Years active: 2014–present

Catherine Elizabeth Shaw (born April 2, 1991) is an American singer-songwriter, musician, and record producer. She gained prominence with her 2014 song "Brooklyn Girls", which went viral and was covered by numerous news media outlets.

== Early life ==
Shaw was born and raised in Virginia Beach, later moving to Brooklyn. Shaw moved to New York City in 2010 to attend School of Visual Arts where she studied painting before dropping out due to financial problems.

== Career ==
Shaw was discovered by her producer, Jay Levine, in the subways of New York City while busking to raise money for food and art supplies.

Shaw's 2014 song "Brooklyn Girls" went viral and received over 300,000 views on YouTube. Brooklyn Girls was widely criticised for its stereotypical portrayal of Brooklyn, and Shaw received several online death threats. NYMag described Brooklyn Girls as "the anthem nobody wanted" and predicted that it would be "a huge hit among suburban teenage girls and people who have never been to Brooklyn". Entertainment Weekly described it as "the most hated song on the internet".

Her follow-up single "Human Contact" shows her smashing a croquet club and curling her hair with bananas. The video was directed by Shaw and Bryan Russell Smith.

Shaw's song "Night Go Slow" is about two girls, Dylann and Jenny, who fall in love. She says that her sexuality "does a lot of good for [her] writing"; she is bisexual, having had relationships with both men and women.

== Discography ==
=== Extended plays ===
- Clouds EP (2013)
- The Brooklyn EP (2014)
- Human Contact: Remix EP (2015)
- The Ransom (2016)
- Head Games EP (2018)

=== Singles ===
- "Lovesick Jerk" (2016)
- "The Ransom" (2016)
- "Tell Everyone" (2015)
- "Walks All Over You" (2015)
- "Rumble In The Park" (2015)
- "Cuddle Up" (2014)
- "Human Contact" (2014)
- "Brooklyn Girls" (2014)
- "Family" (2012)
