= Laura White (singer) =

English singer-songwriter

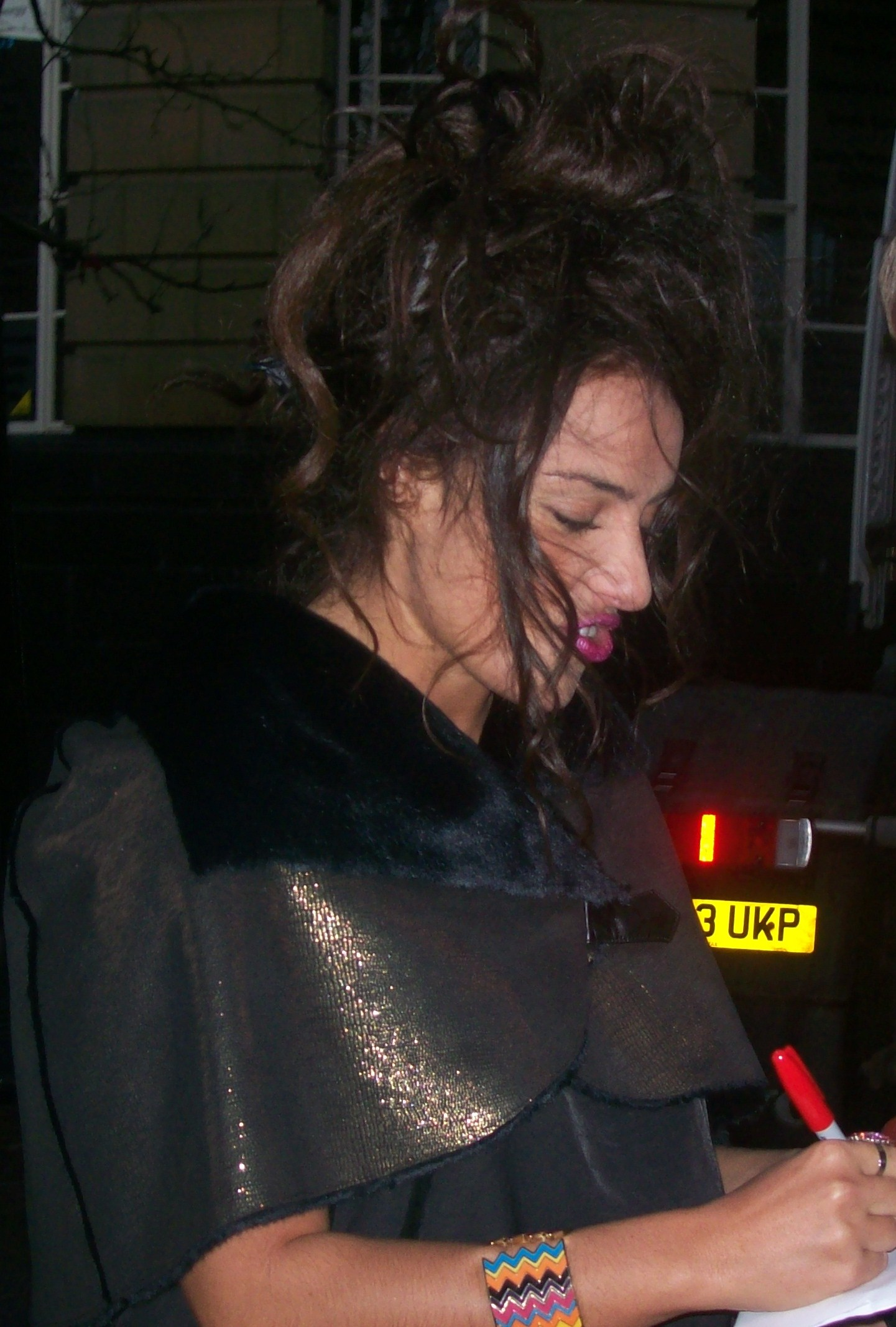
- White in 2011

Background information
- Born: Laura Jane Amanda White; 31 August 1987 (age 39); Atherton, Greater Manchester, England
- Genres: Soul, jazz, Pop
- Occupation: Singer-songwriter
- Instruments: Vocals, piano
- Years active: 2008–present

Laura Jane Amanda White (born 31 August 1987) is an English singer and songwriter. She was a contestant on the fifth series of the British TV talent show The X Factor in 2008, eventually becoming the fifth contestant eliminated. White has penned songs for multiple artists, including Charles Hamilton's Grammy-nominated "New York Raining" featuring Rita Ora. White also co-wrote and featured with Galantis on their hit "Love on Me" and Cash Cash "Gasoline". She has also worked with Beverley Knight, Naughty Boy, Hugel, Hannah Grace, Ms Banks, Bugzy Malone, MistaJam, James Carter and Lucas & Steve and has recently written for Alicia Keys, Kelly Clarkson, Andre 3000, Galantis, Inna, JP Cooper, Rag'n'Bone Man, Matoma, Steps, Timmy Trumpet, Stormzy and Tinie Tempah.

White has written numerous music scores for Netflix's 'The Bold Type', BBC, and many HBO adverts, including one alongside Missy Elliott. White also co-wrote and featured on the soundtrack for the ‘Four Kids And It’ blockbuster movie starring Michael Caine. She also penned The Voice Australia winner single "Nobody" for Taryn Stokes, charting at number 1.

White has also featured on TV shows This Morning, Good Morning Britain, Lorraine, Loose Women and Alan Titchmarsh. White has played arenas and shows alongside duetting with Mariah Carey, Coronation Street and Loose Women.

Recent podcasts featuring White include Global's Jenni Falconer's podcast 'RUNPOD' and many music podcasts on songwriting, including Björn Ulvaeus (ABBA) podcast and Louise Golbey's Ivor Novello podcast.

== Early life ==
White began singing in jazz bars at the age of 15 and played many festivals. White went to Fred Longworth High School in Tyldesley, the same school as actors Anthony Quinlan, Leah Hackett and Oliver Lee. She studied her A-Levels in English Literature and Drama at Wigan and Leigh College, before going on to study creative writing at The University of Bolton.

White was later chosen to be in a soul band alongside Mark Ronson as a producer.

== Career ==
=== 2008–09: The X Factor ===
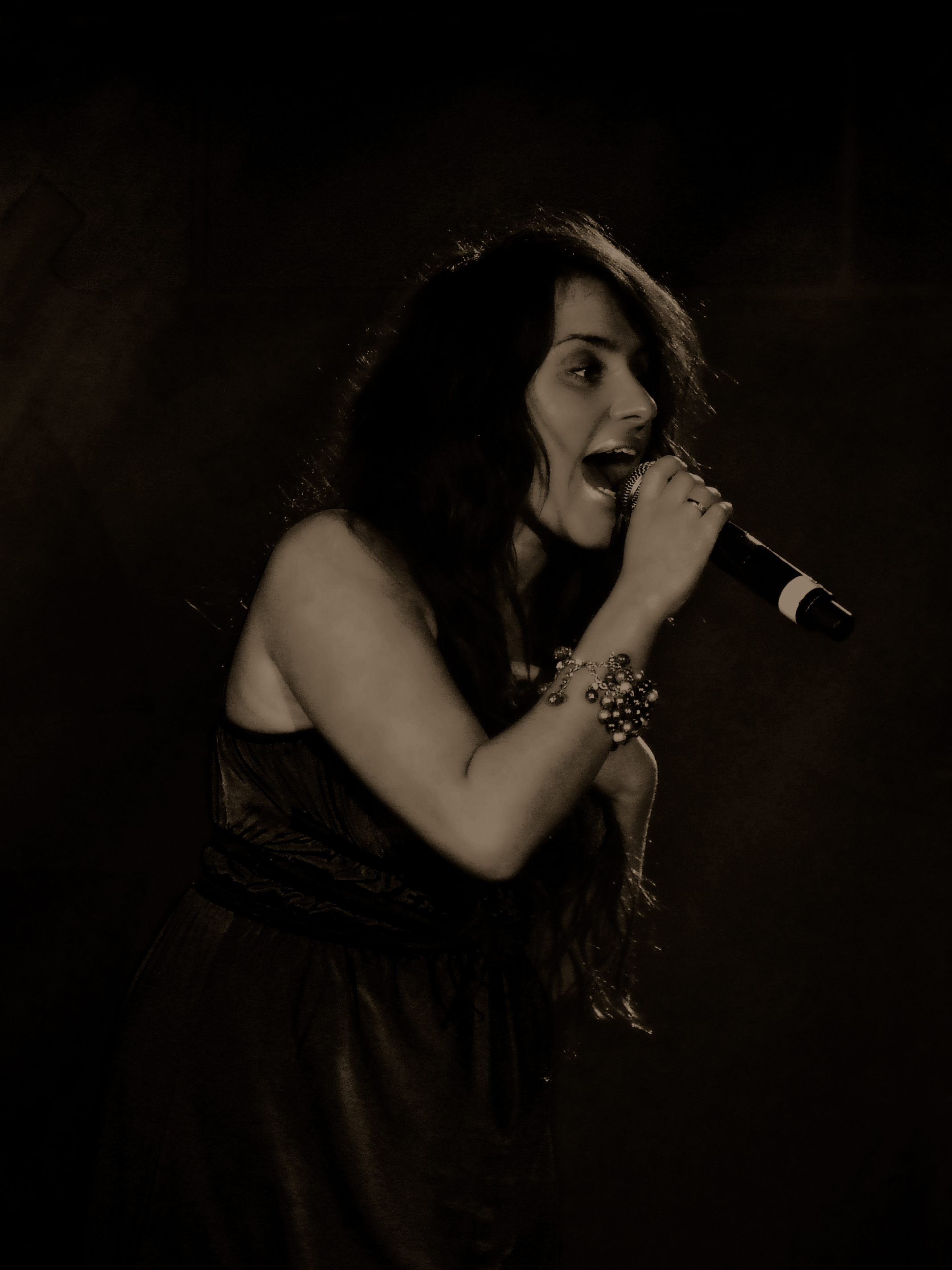
White performing in Skegness, 2008

White auditioned for the 2008 series of The X Factor and reached the final live stages in the "Girls" category, mentored by Cheryl Cole. After performing Fallin', by Alicia Keys, on the first live show, White sang You Are Not Alone as part of Michael Jackson week the following episode. She then performed God Bless the Child, originally recorded by Billie Holiday, as part of the third week's focus on big band music, and Somebody Else's Guy, written and performed by Jocelyn Brown, on the fourth live show as part of disco week. After performing Endless Love by Lionel Richie and Diana Ross in the fifth week, White was voted off the show on 8 November, after a sing-off against Ruth Lorenzo.

After her elimination, fans of White circulated a petition for broadcasting watchdog Ofcom to investigate phone voting procedures on the show, complaining of a lack of transparency in the voting system and of difficulties in getting through to vote for White–allegations which were denied by a show spokesman. The issue was even mentioned in the Houses of Parliament by her local MP Andy Burnham, who commented that White's exit had been "very harsh".

=== 2009–2012: What My Mother Taught Me ===
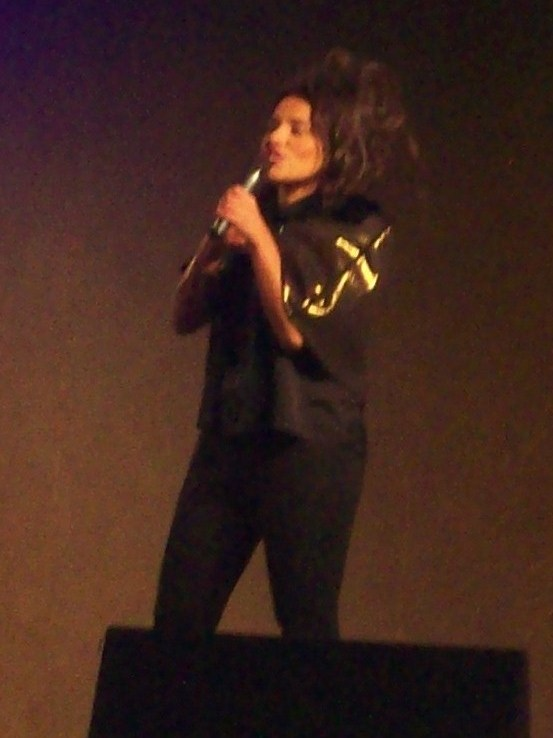
White performing live in November 2011

The Manchester Evening News reported on 11 November 2008 that White had been approached by an as-yet unnamed record company. White was chosen by Peterborough City Council to perform and turn on the annual Christmas lights at Cathedral Square, Peterborough. A crowd of 6,000 attended and cheered as the lights were turned on. White then went on to switch on the lights in the county capital Cambridge on the Sunday night. White was invited to the Brit Awards Launch Party as The X Factor contestant representing the "Hero" single. White was a judge in the 2009 Miss Manchester contest and sang at the Miss England contest.

In early August 2009, White posted samples of four tracks onto her website. Fans were allowed to vote for one of the four to become her debut single. The candidates were: "You Should Have Known", "Touch You", "Got It Bad" and "Love Hurts". "You Should Have Known" was chosen as her debut single. The song was written by Ivor Novello-winning songwriter Michelle Escoffrey and produced by Ian Green, the man behind Madonna's autumn 2009 album Celebration. Speaking in October 2009 to noted UK R&B writer Pete Lewis of the award-winning Blues & Soul, White stated: "I'm really pleased to kick my whole album project off with 'You Should Have Known."

She performed her track "You Should Have Known" on GMTV on 19 August 2009. The video for the single "You Should Have Known" was shot in early September and was uploaded to White's official YouTube account. The single was released on 2 November 2009. To promote the single, White embarked on a promo tour of the UK. "You Should Have Known" debuted and peaked at No. 32 on the UK Singles Chart. White was also part of the alternative Haiti relief charity single "I Put A Spell on You".

White released her debut extended play, What My Mother Taught Me in 2013.

=== 2012–2023: Songwriting and No. 95 ===
White has written songs for artists including Inna, Leona Lewis, Eliza Doolittle, and Cher Lloyd. White had her first number one with artist Gin Lee in 2012 and also penned songs for many Danish artists and Dutch X Factor winner Lisa Lois. White wrote "New York Raining" for Charles Hamilton & Rita Ora, which was featured on the soundtrack of the US TV show, Empire and nominated for a Grammy in 2015.

In 2016, White confirmed signing a publishing deal to Peer Publishing UK. She released her second extended play, No. 95 in February 2016. She also wrote and featured as a vocalist on the Galantis single, "Love on Me".

=== 2023–present: Woman to Woman ===
In 2023, White released the single "Lemons", the lead single from her upcoming debut studio album. In February 2024, White announced that her debut album would be available to pre–order from the 8th March 2024, sixteen years following her appearance on The X Factor in 2008. Her debut studio album, Woman to Woman, is scheduled to be released in November 2024.

== Discography ==
=== Studio albums ===
Title	Details
Woman to Woman	Released: 29 November 2024; Label: Laura J. A White Dizzi Records; Format: Digital download CD Vinyl

=== Extended plays ===
Title	Details
What My Mother Taught Me	Released: 10 November 2013; Label: Self-released; Format: Digital download
No.95	Released: 12 February 2016; Label: Self-released; Format: Digital download

=== Singles ===
==== As lead artist ====
Year	Title	Peak chart positions		Album
Year	Title	UK	UK Indie	Album
2009	"You Should Have Known"	32	2	Non-album single
2013	"What My Mother Taught Me"	—	—	What My Mother Taught Me
2015	"Kind of Blue"	—	—	Non-album single
2016	"Martha"	—	—	The Painted Door - EP
2018	"Heartbreaker" (featuring Ms Banks)	—	—	Non-album single
2019	"Back to You" (with One Bit)	—	—	Non-album single
2019	"Nobody"	—	—	Non-album single
2020	"Happiness"	—	—	The Bold Type
2020	"Push It Right" (with MOTi)	—	—	Non-album single
2020	"When You're Dancing" (with Mike Candys)	—	—	Non-album single
2023	"Lemons"	—	—	Woman to Woman
2025	"Ricky Hatton (Northern Girl)"	—	—	Non-album single
"—" denotes a single that did not chart or was not released.
"—"

==== As featured artist ====
Year	Title	Peak chart positions		Album
Year	Title	UK	IRE	Album
2008	"Hero" (with The X Factor Finalists)	1	1	Non-album single
2010	"I Put a Spell on You" (with Shane MacGowan and Friends)	—	—	Helping Haiti
2013	"Dalt Vila" (Sister Bliss & Wally Lopez featuring Laura White)	—	—	Non-album singles
2015	"Circles" (Xploder featuring Laura White & Manga St Hilare)	—	—	Non-album singles
2016	"Love on Me" (Galantis and Hook n Sling)	16	21	The Aviary
2017	"Lullaby" (SKIY featuring Laura White)	—	—	Non-album singles
2018	"Ladykiller" (Brunelle featuring Laura White)	—	—	Non-album singles
2018	"Ce sour ?" (El Profesor featuring Laura White [HUGEL Remix])	—	—	Non-album singles
2019	"Ultimatum" (Mistajam featuring Laura White)	—	—	Non-album singles
2020	"Gasoline" (Cash Cash featuring Laura White)	—	—	Say It Like You Feel It
2026	"Back To Me" (Afrojack and Vikkstar featuring Laura White)	_	_	
"—" denotes a single that did not chart or was not released.

=== Songwriting credits ===
Year	Artist	Album	Song	Co-written with
2014	Tracy Wang	Sky EP	"Dreamer"	Ian Barter
2018	Goldstone	Eurovision: You Decide	"I Feel the Love"	Raul Rats, Joakim Buddee, Eric Lumiere
2018	Jaz Ellington	Eurovision: You Decide	"You"	Herman Gardarfve, Ashley Hicklin
2019	Hannah Grace	Remedy	"Different Kind of Love"	Hannah Vivian-Byrne
2019	Gattusso	Non-album single	"Million Things" with Disco Killers	Uri Illuz, Reem Taoz, Matthew Kramer
2019	MOTi	Non-album single	"All the Love You Got"	Timotheus Romme, Friso Venema
2020	Inna	Non-album single	"Nobody"	Ki McPhail, Fridolin Walcher
2020	Steps	What the Future Holds	"One Touch"	Christopher Wahle, Neil Treppas
2023	Beverley Knight	The Fifth Chapter	"Someone Else's Problem"	Christopher Neil, Peter Vale

== Tours ==
White toured on The X Factor live tour, with fellow series 5 finalists. White was also touring with Peter Andre with his Revelation Tour. She continues to perform in gigs/festivals. She has performed her own shows at the Lowry Theatre Manchester, Camden Assembly London and more dates for 2020.
