= You Should Have Known =

Single by Laura White
- Released: 2 November 2009
- Recorded: 2009, Pierce Room, London.
- Genre: R&B, hip hop soul
- Length: 3:12
- Label: The Industry Sound, DCW Records
- Songwriters: Ian Green; Michelle Escoffery
- Producer: Richard Pierce

Laura White singles chronology
"Hero" (2008)	"You Should Have Known" (2009)	"I Put a Spell on You" (2010)

Music video
- "You Should Have Known" on YouTube

"You Should Have Known" is a song performed by Laura White. It was released on 9 November 2009 in the United Kingdom as the first single from White's upcoming debut album.

The song premiered on White's official website with three other album tracks. Fans then had the chance to log onto the website and vote for their favourite song to be White's debut single. "You Should Have Known" thus won the poll and became the single. It reached No. 32 on the UK Singles Chart on 8 November on the basis of digital downloads but dropped to No. 53 in its second week on the chart.

== Promotion ==
White performed the song on GMTV in August 2009. She appeared briefly on BBC2 children's TV show TMi on 31 October 2009 to promote the single. White also hosted an edition of chart show's Daily Fix. She also appeared on the ITV show, Loose Women, performed on The Alan Titchmarsh Show and had an interview on BBC Breakfast on 2 November 2009. Meanwhile, press-wise, in November 2009, she did a musically-significant interview with noted UK R&B writer Pete Lewis of the award-winning 'Blues & Soul'.

== Chart performance ==
The song entered the UK Singles Chart on 8 November 2009 at number 32. It was the lowest new entry of the week in the UK Top 40 and was at No. 2 in the UK Indie Singles Chart. The song peaked at # 70 on the Polish Music Charts on download sales only, despite no promotion in Poland.

Chart (2009)	Peak position
Poland (Dance Top 50)	70
Scotland Singles (OCC)	33
UK Singles Downloads (OCC)	34
UK Indie (OCC)	2
UK Singles (OCC)	32

== Track listings ==
Digital download

1. "You Should Have Known" – 3:12

Digital download

1. "You Should Have Known" (Industrial R&B Mix) – 3:28

Digital download

1. "You Should Have Known" (Oracle Radio Mix) – 3:08

Digital download

1. "You Should Have Known" (Oracle Radio Mix) – 3:07
2. "You Should Have Known" (Oracle Extended Vocal Mix) – 7:53
3. "You Should Have Known" (Oracle Dub) – 6:50

== Release history ==
Region	Date	Format
United Kingdom	2 November 2009	Digital download
United Kingdom	9 November 2009	CD single

== Credits ==
- Executive Producer – Richard Pierce
- Mastered By – Mark Newman
- Producer [Vocal Production], Backing Vocals [Additional] – Michelle Escoffery
- Producer, Mixed By – Ian Green
- Written-By – Ian Green, Michelle Escoffery
