= Brooklyn Girls (Catey Shaw song) =

2014 song by Catey Shaw

Song by Catey Shaw

from the album The Brooklyn EP
- Released: September 9, 2014
- Length: 3:33

"Brooklyn Girls" is a 2014 song by Catey Shaw that went viral and received over 300,000 views on YouTube. It is one of the tracks on her Brooklyn EP.

== Reception ==
Brooklyn Girls was widely criticized for its stereotypical portrayal of Brooklyn, and Shaw received several online death threats. She said that she "was hoping it would receive attention, but ... hoped it would have been more positively received" and that it was "intended as a compliment to Brooklyn". According to Ben Barna, the Brooklyn references were "pretty accurate", and he described the song as "bouncy and undeniably catchy". New York magazine described Brooklyn Girls as "the anthem nobody wanted" and predicted that it would be "a huge hit among suburban teenage girls and people who have never been to Brooklyn". Entertainment Weekly described it as "the most hated song on the internet". Dan Ozzi of Noisey described Brooklyn Girls as "the Rebecca Black 'Friday' video of Brooklyn gentrification" and that "every fucking thing in this video is an ugly stereotype of the worst elements of Brooklyn".

According to Lily Rothman of Time magazine, Shaw "isn't actually singing about Brooklyn the place. She's singing about Brooklyn the adjective". Shaw said in a teaser video that "the whole thing about a Brooklyn girl is you don't have to be from Brooklyn. It's more the whole idea of the strong female." Marc Spitz says in his book Twee that Brooklyn is a "faux neighborhood with a prefabricated culture", and Rothman says in relation to this that, when one sees this faux neighborhood as different from the real neighborhood, Shaw's song "doesn't seem worth the hate". Shaw said that her video represents "the real Brooklyn" but also that "the song is self-portraiture. It's my view of Brooklyn".
