= New York Raining =

Single by Charles Hamilton featuring Rita Ora

from the album Empire
- Released: March 18, 2015
- Length: 3:34
- Label: Republic Records
- Songwriters: Charles Hamilton; The Invisible Men; Laura White
- Producers: Charles Hamilton; The Invisible Men

Charles Hamilton singles chronology
"Gaucho" (2010)	"New York Raining" (2015)

Rita Ora singles chronology
"Doing It" (2015)	"New York Raining" (2015)	"Poison" (2015)

"New York Raining" is a song by American rapper Charles Hamilton featuring British singer Rita Ora. It was released on March 18, 2015. The track appears on the deluxe edition of the season one soundtrack for Fox's TV series Empire.

== Track listing ==
- Digital download
1. "New York Raining" – 3:34
- Digital download – Remixes
1. "New York Raining" (Culture Shock Remix) – 4:19
2. "New York Raining" (Lucky Charmes Remix) – 4:11

== Charts ==
Chart (2015)	Peak position
Australia Urban (ARIA)	16
Scotland Singles (OCC)	19
UK Singles (OCC)	29
UK Hip Hop/R&B (OCC)	5
US R&B/Hip-Hop Digital Songs (Billboard)	46

== Release history ==
Region	Date	Format
United States	March 18, 2015	Digital download
United Kingdom	May 26, 2015	Digital download
