= Zombie Nation =

Zombie Nation may refer to:

- Zombie Nation (musician), a German techno artist best known for the song "Kernkraft 400"
- Zombie Nation (video game), a 1990 NES video game
- Zombie Nation (film), a 2004 independent film
- "Zombie Nation", a 2024 single by British band Kid Kapichi

== See also ==
- Z Nation, a 2014 television series on Syfy
