= Hamilton, Charles (album) =

Studio album by Charles Hamilton
- Released: December 9, 2016
- Recorded: 2014–16
- Genre: Hip hop
- Length: 47:31
- Labels: Starchasers; First Access; Republic
- Producers: Charles Hamilton (exec.); The Invisible Men (also exec.); Raymond Angry (also exec.); The Symphony

Charles Hamilton chronology
The Black Box (2015)	Hamilton, Charles (2016)

Hamilton, Charles is the second studio album and major-label debut by American hip hop recording artist, Charles Hamilton following the shelving and later leak of his commercial debut "This Perfect Life" in 2009. Released on December 9, 2016 by Starchasers Records, First Access Entertainment (formerly Turn First Records), and Republic Records, the album serves as Hamilton's major label debut, after his signing to First Access and Republic in early 2015.

== Background ==
After taking a hiatus from Mainstream media and releasing his music independently via his personal blogs, on October 16, 2014 Hamilton announced via his blog that he had finally started working on his debut studio album.

It would later be announced Hamilton signed a major label record deals with First Access Entertainment (formerly Turn First Records) and Republic Records. On December 12, 2015 during an interview, Hamilton told Billboard that he had more than 100 songs to choose from for his upcoming major-label debut album.

On April 19, 2016 during an interview Hamilton would announce the title of his debut album entitled Hamilton Charles. On October 28, 2016 Hamilton would announce that the release date for his upcoming major-label debut album Hamilton, Charles would be released on December 2, 2016, but it would later get pushed back to December 9.

The cover art was revealed when the album was made available for pre-order on iTunes.

== Music and lyrics ==
Hamilton, Charles is a concept album it is a continuation of Hamilton's concept EP The Black Box that revolves around taking a plane trip around Hamilton's mind & his songs are part of the recordings on the Flight recorder which two men later discover after the plane wrecks. The album's production was handled primarily by Charles Hamilton and The Invisible Men.

On the track entitled "Stay There" off the album Hamilton would address the controversy of getting punched by his former girlfriend at the time & Mary J. Blige's former stepdaughter Briana Latrise stating "Briana had good pussy, why hit her back?, I got my hit back that night in the sack, Shut up management, I'm tryin' to rap, Y'all act like I don't know I die for this craft" Hamilton would also address the past controversy of him dissing fellow former All City Chess Club member J. Cole on a 2012 track entitled "It's My World" stating "I'm not apologizing to Cole, I'm sodomizing his soul, The bottom line is I was high off of coke, Ignore it, I kinda had to force it, it sucked, MTV asked and I didn't give a fuck, I put the shit out and I didn't get a buck, It wasn't for attention cause shit I get enough."

== Release and promotion ==
On January 28, 2015, Hamilton released a snippet of a song, titled "Correct". The song, was produced by Hamilton himself, on March 8, 2015 he would release the full version. On December 11, 2015 Hamilton would release an extended play entitled The Black Box as promotion for the album.

On December 2, 2016, Hamilton released a 50-minute documentary, titled 'Let it Play...Faultlines': The Phoenix That Rose From The Ashes, on Red Bull TV. The documentary features footage of Hamilton, following his life & his career. The film was directed by Fred Scott.

== Critical reception ==
Professional ratings
Review scores
Source	Rating
HipHopDX	3.7 stars on a 5 point scale

Upon its release, Hamilton, Charles was met with positive reviews from music critics. HipHopDX called it a personal triumph & artistic snare.

== Track listing ==
Hamilton, Charles — Standard version
No.	Title	Writer(s)	Producer(s)	Length
1.	"Oh Well"	Charles Eddie-Lee Hamilton, Jr.	Charles Hamilton; The Invisible Men	5:22
2.	"Clowns"	Hamilton	Charles Hamilton; The Invisible Men	3:24
3.	"Everyone"	Hamilton	Charles Hamilton; The Invisible Men	3:53
4.	"Correct"	Hamilton	Charles Hamilton; The Invisible Men	3:44
5.	"Be with You"	Hamilton	Charles Hamilton; The Invisible Men	3:33
6.	"Make Yourself Over"	Hamilton	Charles Hamilton; The Invisible Men	3:20
7.	"Man's World"	Hamilton	Charles Hamilton; The Symphony	4:14
8.	"MVP"	Hamilton	Charles Hamilton; The Invisible Men	3:21
9.	"Only Christina Knows"	Hamilton	Charles Hamilton; The Invisible Men	3:30
10.	"Real Life"	Hamilton	Charles Hamilton; The Invisible Men	3:59
11.	"Stay There"	Hamilton	Charles Hamilton; The Invisible Men	5:46
Total length:				44:06

Hamilton, Charles — iTunes Store standard version
No.	Title	Writer(s)	Producer(s)	Length
12.	"Ugly Supermodel"	Hamilton	Charles Hamilton; The Invisible Men	3:25
Total length:				47:31

== Release history ==
Country	Date	Format	Label
United States	December 9, 2016	Digital download; streaming	Republic; First Access
