= Kosine =

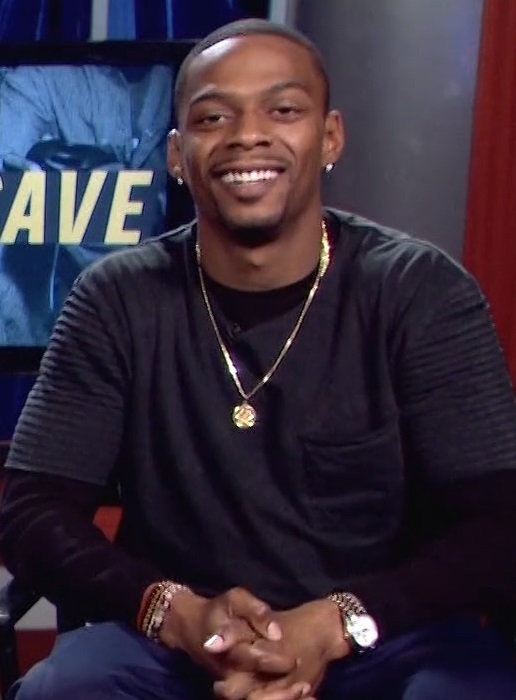
- Kosine in 2018

Background information
- Also known as: Kosine; Kosine on da Beat; Enrique Dragon
- Born: Marcos Palacios; Chicago, Illinois, U.S.
- Genres: R&B, Hip-hop
- Years active: 2004–present

Marcos Palacios, known professionally as Kosine, is an American music producer and songwriter. As a member of the production duo Da Internz, Palacios is known for producing songs such as Big Sean's "Dance (A$$)" (2011), Rihanna's "Birthday Cake" (2011), and Nicki Minaj's "Anaconda" (2014). From 2018, Palacios worked as a soundtrack producer for the television series Empire and Star, debuting as an actor on Star. Palacios has worked as a talk show host on BET's Mancave (2018) and Kingz with Kosine (2020).

== Life and career ==
Palacios was born in Chicago, growing up in neighboring Maywood, Illinois and Broadview, Illinois. After graduating St. Joseph High School in Westchester, Illinois, Palacios moved to Tallahassee, Florida to attend the Florida A&M University, majoring in music. Later transferring to Columbia College Chicago, Palacios formed the idea for his production team, Da Internz, as a part of a class for his Business and Entrepreneurship degree. Palacios, along his production team partner Ernest "Tuo" Clark, moved to Los Angeles in mid-2005, spending time between Los Angeles and Chicago while attempting to break into the music industry. During this period, Palacios was hired by Columbia as a professor, teaching specialized classes in hip-hop beat making and music production.

The duo's first break was produced six songs on rapper Mims' Guilt in 2009, including the album's lead single "Move (If You Wanna)". The duo went on to produce music for hip-hop, R&B and pop musicians, most notably Big Sean's "Dance (A$$)" (2011), Rihanna's "Birthday Cake" (2011), and the group's most commercially successful song, "Anaconda" by Nicki Minaj (2014), who were asked to add additional drums to the song by Minaj.

Palacios decided to start a solo career in 2014, under the moniker Enrique Dragon, releasing his first single Out Here which was later performed by Luke James on the FOX TV Show Star. In 2015, Palacios moved back to Chicago for a reset from entertainment and returned to Columbia College Chicago as the school's first Artist in Residence. During this period, Palacios gave a TEDx talk on finding success at his alma mater in 2016.

In 2016 when he returned to Los Angeles, Palacios became a host for Beats 1 Radio, and in 2018 started work as a co-host of the BET talk show Mancave, as well as restarting his solo career, now under the name KOSINE (pronounced 'Co-sign'), with the song "Your World" featuring JoJo. From 2018, Palacios began producing music for the Fox television series Empire and Star, and hosted writers camps for songwriters and producers to develop music for Star. For season 3 of Star, Palacios made his acting debut as recurring character Lil' Dini.

In 2020, Palacios worked together with Idris Elba on the song "Kings", which raised money for MusiCares' COVID-19 Relief Fund, produced Kelly Rowland's comeback single "Coffee", and in September produced the music for a major Joe Biden 2020 presidential campaign commercial.

In May 2021, he released his first debut EP album "Truth Serum" over streaming services along with starring in a 28-minute music video visual album/short film of the same name, loosely depicting his struggles of finding himself after 10 years of success in Hollywood, narrating a powerful message in how he persevered above it all. The short film EP was also co-produced by Marcus Paulk of Moesha fame. The exclusive video release premiered on Revolt TV on May 7, 2021.

== Personal life ==
Palacios' father was Guatemalan Olympiad Teodoro Palacios, who immigrated to Chicago in 1970. His mother was originally from Panama.

== Filmography ==
Television
Year	Title	Role	Notes
2018	BET's Mancave	Himself (co-host)	
2018	Sidewalks Entertainment	Himself	Episode "The Stars of Mancave"
2018–2019	Star	Lil' Dini	Recurring (season 3)
2020–present	Kingz with Kosine	Himself (host)	Streaming show on Fox Soul.
2021	Truth Serum	Himself	Album Music Video/Short Film (aired on Revolt TV)
2021	BET Presents: The Encore	Himself	

== Discography ==
=== Albums ===
- Truth Serum (2021) - EP Album

=== Singles ===
==== As lead artist ====
List of singles, showing year released and album name
Title	Year	Album
"Out Here" (as Enrique Dragon)	2014	Non-album singles
"Grateful" (as Enrique Dragon featuring Problem)	2015	Non-album singles
"Your World" (featuring JoJo)	2018	Non-album singles
"One More Time" (featuring Problem)	2018	Non-album singles
"I Got Ya" (featuring Cinque')	2018	Non-album singles
"Everybody Vote"	2020	Non-album singles
"Kings" (featuring Idris Elba) "Kings (Remix)" (featuring G Herbo & Marcus Black)	2020/2021	Non-album singles

Album singles
Title	Year	Album
"Transparency" (featuring Jeremih)	2021	Truth Serum (EP album)
"Settle" (featuring Leon Thomas)	2021	Truth Serum (EP album)

==== As featured artist ====
List of singles, showing year released and album name
Title	Year	Album
"Drill Queen" (W.W.A featuring Enrique Dragon)	2015	Non-album singles
"Obey" (Juicy M. & Luka Caro featuring Enrique Dragon)	2016	Non-album singles

=== Guest appearances and solo production discography ===
Title	Year	Artist(s)	Album
"Grass Is Always Greener"	2015	Ludacris	Ludaversal
"Good Lovin"	2015	Ludacris, Miguel	Ludaversal
"Rollin' Like a Stoner"	2017	Vic Mensa	The Manuscript / The Autobiography
"Lurkin"	2017	DaniLeigh	Summer with Friends
"Man Now"	2017	G Herbo	Humble Beast
"This n That"	2017	G Herbo, Lil Yachty, Jeremih	Humble Beast
"Stay Where You Are"	2017	Tank	Savage
"You Got It"	2017	Young Sparrow and DJ Dragon Nutz	Pitch Perfect 3 [Original Motion Picture Soundtrack]
"Unbelievable"	2018	Snoop Dogg, Ev3	Bible of Love
"Big Shoes"	2018	Empire Cast, Yazz, Serayah	Empire: Original Soundtrack from Season 4
"Don't"	2018	Tiffany Red	Rollin' with the Homies
"Out Here Touchin'"	2018	Star Cast, Luke James	Star: Original Soundtrack From Season 2
"Aim x Shoot"	2018	Star Cast, Luke James, Jude Demorest	Star: Original Soundtrack From Season 2
"Right Moves"	2018	Christina Aguilera, Keida Shenseea	Liberation
"How Do You Feel"	2018	Evvie McKinney	Non-album single
"For Sure"	2018	Star Cast, Ryan Destiny, Jude Demorest, Brittany O'Grady	Star: Original Soundtrack from Season 3
"Madonna"	2018	Star Cast, Brittany O’Grady, Jude Demorest, Ryan Destiny	Star: Original Soundtrack from Season 3
"My Type"	2018	Star Cast, My Type Jude Demorest, Ryan Destiny, Brittany O'Grady	Star: Original Soundtrack from Season 3
"Same Time"	2018	Empire Cast, Jussie Smollett, Yazz	Empire: Original Soundtrack from Season 5
"Own It"	2018	Ella Mai	Ella Mai
"Rumble"	2018	Empire Cast, Yazz	Empire: Original Soundtrack from Season 5
"All I Need"	2018	Star Cast, Brandy	Star: Original Soundtrack from Season 3
"Don't You Look at Me"	2018	Star Cast, Evan Ross, Brittany O'Grady	Star: Original Soundtrack from Season 3
"Yo No Se"	2018	DaniLeigh, Bill$	The Plan
"Better Than Before"	2018	Tone Stith	Non-album single
"Lolita"	2019	Star Cast, Kosine	Star: Original Soundtrack from Season 3
"All Love"	2019	Star Cast, Luke James & Brittany O'Grady	Star: Original Soundtrack from Season 3
"Splash"	2019	Empire Cast, Yazz	Empire: Original Soundtrack from Season 5
"Believe in Me"	2019	Star Cast, Ryan Destiny	Star: Original Soundtrack from Season 3
"Lean on Me"	2019	Empire Cast, Yazz, Jussie Smollett	Empire: Original Soundtrack from Season 5
"Type of Way"	2019	Sonta	Hood Love: Vol. 1
"What It Do"	2019	Star Cast, Kosine, Major	Star: Original Soundtrack from Season 3
"Do It Right"	2019	Empire Cast, Katlynn Simone, Mario, Serayah, Yazz	Empire: Music from Season 6
"FaceTime"	2019	Empire Cast, Yazz	Empire: Music from Season 6
"Let Me Live"	2019	Empire Cast, Katlynn Simone	Empire: Music from Season 6
"New Again"	2019	Empire Cast, V. Bozeman	Empire: Music from Season 6
"Ibiza"	2020	Empire Cast, Yazz, Serayah	Empire: Music from Season 6
"Hakeem + Blake Battle"	2020	Empire Cast, Chett Hanks, Yazz	Empire: Music from Season 6
"Lookin' at Me"	2020	Empire Cast, Rhyon Brown, Yazz	Empire: Music from Season 6
"The Oath"	2020	Empire Cast, Rhyon Brown, Yazz	Empire: Music from Season 6
"Coffee"	2020	Kelly Rowland	K
"Guerilla Warfare "	2020	Deanna	Non-album singles
"We Are Champions"	2020	B Howard & Vanness Wu	Non-album singles
"Thirsty"	2020	Good Girl, Mulatto	Good Girl - EP
"No More Teardrops"	2020	Vic Mensa, Malik Yusef, Wyatt Waddell	Reprise
