= Empire discography =

Empire cast discography
- EPs: 12
- Soundtrack albums: 4
- Singles: 29

The Empire cast has released 4 soundtrack albums, twelve extended plays (EPs), and 29 singles. Empire features on-screen performance-based musical numbers, which are original songs of popular songs, with genres ranging from R&B to pop and Rap & Hip-Hop.

For the first season, the group's debut album, Empire: Original Soundtrack from Season 1, was released by Columbia Records on March 10, 2015, The soundtrack received positive critical reception and debuted at number one on the Billboard 200 chart in the United States, 110,000 copies in the first week. On September 11, 2015, another soundtrack titled Empire: The Complete Season 1 was released containing every song heard on the show that weren't included on the official soundtrack. As of December 2015, the album has sold 470,000 total copies in the United States. In January 2016, the album was certified Gold in the United States.

== Soundtrack albums ==
List of albums, with selected chart positions and certifications
Title	Album details	Peak chart positions								Sales	Certifications
Title	Album details	AUS	CAN	FRA	IRL	NZ	SWI	UK	US	Sales	Certifications
Empire: Original Soundtrack from Season 1	Released: March 10, 2015; Label: Columbia; Format: CD, digital download	31	25	51	61	7	7	18	1	US: 470,000 (Note: United States sales figures for Empire: Original Soundtrack from Season 1 as of December 2015.)	RIAA: Gold; BPI: Silver
Empire: Original Soundtrack Season 2 Volume 1	Released: November 20, 2015; Label: Columbia; Format: CD, digital download	—	—	171	—	—	—	74	16		
Empire: Original Soundtrack Season 2 Volume 2	Released: April 29, 2016; Label: Columbia; Format: CD, digital download	—	—	—	—	—	—	139	26		
Empire: The Complete Season 2	Released: July 8, 2016; Label: Columbia; Format: CD, digital download	—	—	66	—	—	—	—	—		
"—" denotes a release that did not chart.

== Season 1: 2015 ==
List of singles with selected chart positions and showing album name
Title	Peak chart positions										Album
Title	AUT	CAN	FRA	GER	NZ	SWI	UK	US R&B /HH	US R&B	US	Album
"Good Enough" (feat. Jussie Smollett)	54	—	60	25	—	55	—	33	13	106	Empire: Original Soundtrack from Season 1
"No Apologies" (feat. Jussie Smollett & Yazz)	—	—	195	—	—	—	—	44	—	123	Empire: Original Soundtrack from Season 1
"Up All Night" (Jamal's 2015 Version) (feat. Jussie Smollett)	—	—	—	—	—	—	—	—	—	—	Empire: Original Soundtrack from Season 1
"Keep It Movin'" (feat. Serayah McNeill)	—	—	—	—	—	—	—	—	—	—	Empire: Original Soundtrack from Season 1
"War of the Roses" (feat. Jim Beanz)	—	—	—	—	—	—	—	—	—	—	Empire: Original Soundtrack from Season 1
"Drip Drop" (feat. Yazz and Serayah McNeill)	—	—	—	—	—	—	—	—	—	—	Empire: Original Soundtrack from Season 1
"Keep Your Money" (feat. Jussie Smollett)	—	—	181	91	—	—	—	32	13	99	Empire: Original Soundtrack from Season 1
"You're So Beautiful" (feat. Jussie Smollett and Yazz)	—	—	79	42	—	—	—	18	10	47	Empire: Original Soundtrack from Season 1
"Nothing But a Number" (feat. Yazz and Naomi Campbell)	—	—	—	—	—	—	—	—	—	—	Empire: Original Soundtrack from Season 1
"Lola" (feat. Jussie Smollett and Yazz)	—	—	—	—	—	—	—	—	—	—	Empire: Original Soundtrack from Season 1
"You're So Beautiful" (White Party Version) (feat. Jussie Smollett)	—	—	—	—	—	—	—	—	—	—	Empire: Original Soundtrack from Season 1
"You're So Beautiful" (Full Cast Version) (feat. Estelle, Terrence Howard, Jussie Smollett, Yazz and Serayah McNeill)	—	—	—	—	—	—	—	—	—	—	Empire: Original Soundtrack from Season 1
"You're So Beautiful" (90s Version) (feat. Terrence Howard)	—	—	—	—	—	—	—	—	—	—	Empire: Original Soundtrack from Season 1
"What the DJ Says" (feat. Jussie Smollett & Yazz)	—	—	—	—	—	—	—	—	—	—	Empire: Original Soundtrack from Season 1
"Take Me To the River" (feat. Courtney Love)	—	—	—	—	—	—	—	—	—	—	Empire: Original Soundtrack from Season 1
"Nothing To Lose" (feat. Terrence Howard and Jussie Smollett)	—	—	—	—	—	—	—	—	—	—	Empire: Original Soundtrack from Season 1
"Live In The Moment" (107 Edit) (feat. Jussie Smollett & Yazz)	—	—	—	—	—	—	—	—	—	—	Empire: Original Soundtrack from Season 1
"Jay Jazz Plus One" (Instrumental)	—	—	—	—	—	—	—	—	—	—	Empire: Original Soundtrack from Season 1
"For My God" (feat. Jennifer Hudson)	—	—	—	—	—	—	—	—	—	—	Empire: Original Soundtrack from Season 1
"Come Away With Me" (feat. Jussie Smollett)	—	—	—	—	—	—	—	—	—	—	Empire: Original Soundtrack from Season 1
"Black & Blue" (feat. V. Bozeman)	—	—	—	—	—	—	—	—	—	—	Empire: Original Soundtrack from Season 1
"All of the Above" (feat. Jussie Smollett)	—	—	—	—	—	—	—	—	—	—	Empire: Original Soundtrack from Season 1
"—" denotes a release that did not chart.

== Other charted songs ==
A number of songs that were not specifically released as singles, but could still be individually downloaded from their albums/EPs, received enough individual downloads to appear on the singles charts.

List of songs, with selected chart positions, showing year charted, album name, and episode name
Title	Year	Peak chart positions										Album
Title	Year	AUS	CAN	FRA	GER	POR Dig.	IRL	NZ	SWI	UK	US	Album
"What is Love" (feat. V. Bozeman)	2015	—	—	67	—	—	—	—	—	—	112	Empire: Original Soundtrack from Season 1
"Keep Your Money" (feat. Jussie Smollett)	2015	—	—	181	91	—	—	—	—	—	99	Empire: Original Soundtrack from Season 1
Conqueror (feat. Estelle & Jussie Smollett)	2015	—	—	157	87	3	—	—	—	42	42	Empire: Original Soundtrack from Season 1
"Powerful" (feat. Jussie Smollett and Alicia Keys)	2015	—	—	152	—	—	—	—	—	—	—	Empire: Season 2 Vol. 1
Boom Boom Boom Boom (feat. Terrence Howard, Bre-Z)	2016	—	—	171	—	—	—	—	—	—	—	Empire: Season 2 Vol. 1
"—" denotes a release that did not chart.
