= List of Empire characters =

Empire is an American musical drama television series created by Lee Daniels and Danny Strong which debuted on January 7, 2015, on Fox. Although filmed in Chicago, the show is based in New York City and it centers on a fictional hip hop music and entertainment company, Empire Entertainment, and the drama among the members of the founders' family as they fight for control of the company.

== Main characters ==
Actor	Character	Seasons					
Actor	Character	1	2	3	4	5	6
Terrence Howard	Lucious Lyon	Main	Main	Main	Main	Main	Main
Taraji P. Henson	Cookie Lyon	Main	Main	Main	Main	Main	Main
Bryshere Y. Gray	Hakeem Lyon	Main	Main	Main	Main	Main	Main
Jussie Smollett	Jamal Lyon	Main	Main	Main	Main	Main	
Trai Byers	Andre Lyon	Main	Main	Main	Main	Main	Main
Grace Byers	Anika Calhoun	Main	Main	Main	Main		
Malik Yoba	Vernon Turner	Main					
Kaitlin Doubleday	Rhonda Lyon	Main	Main	Recurring	Guest		
Gabourey Sidibe	Becky Williams	Recurring	Main	Main	Main	Main	Main
Ta'Rhonda Jones	Porsha Taylor	Recurring	Main	Main	Main	Main	Main
Serayah	Tiana Brown	Recurring	Main	Main	Main	Main	Main
Morocco Omari	Tariq Cousins		Recurring	Main			
Bre-Z	Freda Gatz		Recurring	Main			Guest
Xzibit	Shyne Johnson		Guest	Main	Main	Guest	
Andre Royo	Thirsty Rawlings		Recurring	Recurring	Main	Main	
Rumer Willis	Tory Ash			Recurring	Main		
Terrell Carter	Warren Hall			Guest	Main		Guest
Nicole Ari Parker	Giselle Sims-Barker				Recurring	Main	Main
Chet Hanks	Blake Sterling				Recurring	Main	
Rhyon Nicole Brown	Maya Landry-Lyon				Guest	Main	Main
A.Z. Kelsey	Jeff Kingsley					Main	Main
Vivica A. Fox	Candace Holloway-Mason		Recurring	Recurring	Recurring	Recurring	Main
Meta Golding	Teri Lyon					Recurring	Main
Mario	Devon					Recurring	Main
Katlynn Simone	Treasure					Recurring	Main
Wood Harris	Damon Cross					Recurring	Main

Lucious Lyon (Terrence Howard (original cast), 2015–2020)
A former drug dealer turned hip hop mogul and the founder and long-time CEO of Empire Entertainment whose life begins to cave in around him after his past sins come back to haunt him when allegedly diagnosed with ALS.

Loretha "Cookie" Holloway Lyon (Taraji P. Henson (original cast), 2015–2020)
Lucious Lyon's outspoken wife and mother of his three sons, who served a 17-year stretch in prison for drug dealing. She sees herself as the sacrificial lamb for Empire Entertainment, which she built with Lucious, but then took the fall for when she was arrested for running the drugs that financed Lucious' early career. Upon her return from prison, she is determined to bring the Lyon family back together and reclaim her share of Empire Entertainment. In the second season, Cookie leaves Empire and starts her own record label, Lyon Dynasty. After allowing Empire Entertainment to acquire Lyon Dynasty, she returns to Empire as co-CEO with Lucious and Head of A&R. Cookie's love interests are Malcolm DeVeaux, Laz Delgado (Season 2) and Angelo DuBois (Season 3).

Andre Lyon (Trai Byers (original cast), 2015–2020)
The eldest son of the Lyon family and CFO of Empire Entertainment. He is Wharton educated, power hungry, and suffers from bipolar disorder. He is married to his college sweetheart, Rhonda. He plans to run Empire, but is in a battle for the head chair with his younger brothers. In the second season, Andre initially helps Cookie and Hakeem set up Lyon Dynasty, but later returns to Empire. Lucious later promotes Andre to President of Gutter Life Records, a sub-division of Empire Entertainment consisting of mainly urban rappers, such as Freda Gatz. In Season 3 & 4, he loses his wife and becomes Nessa, Charlotte & Pamela's new lovers.

Jamal Lyon (Jussie Smollett (original cast), 2015– 2019)
The middle son of the Lyon family, an openly gay singer-songwriter who despises the corporate aspect of the music industry. He is estranged from his father who considers him the "black sheep" of the family. Jamal is Cookie's favorite and has a strong relationship with his brother Hakeem. At the end of the first season, Lucious appoints Jamal as his successor and, later, interim CEO when he is arrested. He later relinquishes control of Empire back to Lucious. After being shot accidentally by Freda Gatz in Season 2, Jamal begins to present symptoms of PTSD and reliance on painkillers. His addiction ultimately leads to a visit to rehab.

Hakeem Lyon (Bryshere Y. Gray (original cast), 2015–2020)
The fame-obsessed youngest son of the Lyon family and Lucious's favorite child, who is a hip hop star on the rise. Hakeem starts to find feelings for his mother, Cookie, and has a great relationship with Jamal. He has relationships with Tiana Brown, Camilla Marks, Anika Calhoun, Valentina, and Laura.

Anika Calhoun Lyon (Grace Byers (original cast), 2015–2018)
Initially the ambitious head of Empire Entertainment A&R who becomes engaged to Lucious, but they eventually separate. After leaving Empire, Anika begins to sleep with Hakeem, leading to Anika's pregnancy. Fearful of Rhonda's pregnancy and the unborn child's claim to being the Heir of Empire, Anika pushes Rhonda down a set of stairs, leading to the death of her unborn child. Cookie and Anika share an extreme dislike for one another, with Cookie referring to Anika as the derisive nickname "Boo Boo Kitty". Anika meets her demise in the Season 4 finale after Andre drugs her to guilt her for all the wrong she's done. Like Andre, Anika hallucinates Rhonda and tries to run from her, but she accidentally falls over a balcony and onto a table full of wine glasses, killing her.

Vernon Turner (Malik Yoba (original cast), 2015)
Lucious Lyon's longtime friend and business partner, and chairman of Empire Entertainment. He was accidentally murdered by Rhonda in the season one finale.

Rhonda Lyon (Kaitlin Doubleday (original cast), 2015–2016, 2018)
Andre's wife. She is extremely fierce and loyal, and sticks by Andre's side as he tries to gain control of Empire. In the first-season finale, she finds out that she is pregnant, but the baby eventually dies in the second season spring premiere, after Anika violently pushed her down the stairs in the second season fall finale. After her recovery, Rhonda begins to work for Empire's fashion label, Antony and Cleopatra, initially headed by Camilla Marks-Whiteman. After Camilla's suicide, Rhonda is appointed Creative Director of Antony and Cleopatra. In the third-season premiere, she falls off of a building and lands onto a car, leading to her death, after attacking Anika. She makes a few appearances in the first half of the third season as a "ghost"; appearing to Andre due to his hallucinations. In the Season 4 finale, she returns as a hallucination to Anika this time as a result of Andre drugging her; leading up to her own tragic death in a similar scenario Rhonda faced. "Rhonda" gazes upon the dying Anika and vanishes before her eyes.

Rebecca "Becky" Williams (Gabourey Sidibe (original cast), 2015–2020)
Executive assistant to Lucious Lyon at Empire Entertainment. After Jamal's promotion to vice-chairman, Jamal promotes Becky to A&R at Empire and its sub-label, Gutter Life Records.

Porsha Taylor (Ta'Rhonda Jones, 2015–2020)
Cookie Lyon's executive assistant.

Tiana Brown (Serayah, 2015–2020)
An artist at Empire Entertainment who becomes Hakeem Lyon's girlfriend for some time. In Season 2, she leaves Empire for Lyon Dynasty. She also starts to get jealous of the relationship Hakeem has with Laura. In Season 3, her and Hakeem reconcile. At the season 4 finale, she reveals that she is pregnant with Hakeem's child and they plan to be a family. In Season 5, two years later they are still together and have a son named Prince Lyon.

Tariq Cousins (Morocco Omari, 2016–2017)
An FBI agent and Lucious Lyon's paternal half-brother. He was stabbed in the neck by Leah in Toil and Trouble Part 1.

Leslie "Shine" Johnson (Xzibit, 2016–2018)
Described as "100 percent wolf and 100 percent gangsta," he is a rival of Lucious Lyon. In season 4, He was shot and killed by Webb for trying to kill Lucious in the Season 3 finale.

Giselle Sims-Barker (Nicole Ari Parker, 2017–2020)
The beautiful trophy ex-wife of Eddie Barker.

Maya (Rhyon Nicole Brown, 2018–2020)
The daughter of Poundcake, Cookie Lyon's fellow inmate. Maya was born in prison, stolen from her mother's arms, and adopted by upper middle-class parents. A classically trained dancer, she's beautiful, graceful, and headstrong. She woke up married to Hakeem during their trip from Vegas.

Jeff Kingsley (A.Z. Kelsey, 2018–2020)
Kinglsey is revealed to be the illegitimate son of Lucious, something he reveals in to the entire Lyon Family while shaming his father to the public. In the season finale, Kingsley commits suicide.

== Recurring characters ==
This is a list of recurring actors and the characters they portrayed in multiple episodes, which were significant roles, sometimes across multiple seasons. The characters are listed by the season in which they first appeared.

Carol Holloway (Tasha Smith, 2015–2020)
Cookie Lyon's younger sister from Philadelphia, Pennsylvania. She is a recovering drug addict.

Juanita (Claudette Burchett, 2015–2020)
Lucious Lyon's housekeeper.

Chicken (AzMarie Livingston, 2015–2020)
A member of Hakeem Lyon's crew and a DJ.

Steve Cho (Mike Moh, 2015–2017)
Public relations employee at Empire.

Michael Sanchez (Rafael de la Fuente, 2015–2016)
Chef and Jamal Lyon's former boyfriend. They separate in season 1, but reunited sometime before the premiere of season 2. Michael eventually cheats on Jamal with Chase One, and they end their relationship.

Camilla Marks Whiteman (Naomi Campbell, 2015–2016)
Fashion designer and Hakeem Lyon's lover but then leaves him, later on she is announced as the wife of Mimi Whiteman in the second season. Camilla uses her connection to Mimi and seizes Empire to give it to Hakeem but he rejects her for Laura. Camilla later poisons Mimi and is caught by Lucious who records her act, he gives her the chance to commit suicide and she drinks the same poison and dies off-screen.

Veronica (V. Bozeman, 2015–2017)
An artist formerly signed to Empire Entertainment.

Ryan Morgan (Eka Darville, 2015)
Documentary filmmaker, who eventually becomes a fling of Jamal's.

Agent Harlow Carter (Nealla Gordon, 2015)
FBI agent, working with Cookie Lyon.

Marcus "Bunkie" Williams (Antoine McKay, 2015); 2019 (flashback)
Cookie Lyon's cousin who is killed by Lucious.

Malcolm DeVeaux (Derek Luke, 2015)
Head of Security at Empire and love interest of Cookie Lyon.

Billy Baretti (Judd Nelson, 2015–2019)
Owner of Creedmoor Entertainment.

Reverend L.C. Price (Charles Malik Whitfield, 2015, 2018)
Pastor who helps Andre.

Leonard Bernstein (Will Kinnear, 2015–2018)
Empire board member.

Edna Bunnin (Sara Sevigny, 2015–2018)
Empire board member.

Leah Mary Walker (Kelly Rowland, 2015–2016 (flashbacks); Leslie Uggams, 2016–2020)
Lucious Lyon's presumed dead mother, who turned out to be living in a nursing facility. She is eventually brought to New York City by Andre, and is now living with Lucious.

Mimi Whiteman (Marisa Tomei, 2015)

Candace Holloway-Mason (Vivica A. Fox, 2015–2020)
Cookie Lyon's well-behaved but snobby and judgmental older sister. She lives in Blue Bell, Pennsylvania, with her husband, Kevin (who is white), and their two children, Brianna and Franklin. She is a realtor.

Roxanne Ford (Tyra Ferrell, 2015)
Prosecutor.

Thurston "Thirsty" Rawlings (Andre Royo, 2015–2019)
Lucious Lyon's sharp lawyer who has unethical moves and a shady past.

Freda Gathers\"Freda Gatz" (Bre-z, 2015–2019)

Derek "D-Major" Major (Tobias Truvillion, 2015–p2017)
Music producer, who is secretly gay and Jamal's love interest.

Laz Delgado (Adam Rodriguez, 2015)
Concert promoter and love interest of Cookie Lyon, until it was revealed that he had involvement in a series of scare tactics and money schemes against Lyon Dynasty.

Laura Calleros (Jamila Velazquez, 2015–2016)
Lead singer of Mirage à Trois, who left Hakeem Lyon at the altar.

Jameson Henthrop (William Fichtner, 2015–2016)
Influential music marketing executive who helps Jamal in part because they are both representatives of the gay community.

Angelo DuBois (Taye Diggs, 2016–2017)
A well-respected city councilman with a Harvard law degree and a wealthy background. He was romantically involved with Cookie Lyon. He later breaks up and willingly follows his mother to plot against the Lyons. He tries to kill his cousin Warren for betraying the family and siding with the Lyons, then Jamal only to be fatally shot when Jamal tries to defend himself.

Diana DuBois (Phylicia Rashad, 2016–2017; 2018)

Xavier Rosen (Samuel Hunt, 2016)
A&R representative at Empire.

Nessa Parker (Sierra McClain, 2016–2018)

Philip (Juan Antonio, 2016–2017)
Runs PTSD support group and helps Jamal. Dates Jamal.

Gram (Romeo Miller, 2016)
Musician who dates Tiana and then accused of hacking Empire.

Guiliana "Giusi" Green (Nia Long, 2017)

Charlotte Frost (Eva Longoria, 2017)

Tory Ash (Rumer Willis, 2016–2018)
A singer-songwriter who bonds with Jamal during his time in rehab. She is a musician and was a big star, until she stripped down in Dealy Plaza and almost overdosed in a dingy motel room. Tory was introduced a smart mouth and begins to go toe to toe with Cookie Lyon. She has made many references to her past drugs life and says many drug jokes that Jamal Lyon does not find funny. She dies in the hospital after an overdose.

Warren Hall (Terrell Carter, 2017–2019)
The attorney-musician nephew of the duplicitous Lyon-hater Diana DuBois, that she sent to seduce Jamal. How will Diana react when Warren (inevitably) develops real feelings for Jamal and what will Jamal do when he discovers that his new boyfriend is actually a dreaded Dubois?

Pamela Rose (Teyonah Parris, 2017)
An NYPD detective and liaison. She is first seen at a bar and has sex with Andre before she is later revealed as NYPD liaison and seen with the Vegas Metro detectives about Guiliana Green's disappearance. She and Andre engage in a sexual relationship, but when he reveals he ordered the car bomb to kill Lucious, she reveals she is really with Vegas Metro and played him all this time, leading to a scuffle where Andre inadvertently kills her. Then Pamela is revealed to be a complete hallucination caused by psycho-active drugs given to by his therapist, who was secretly in league with the DuBois family.

Eddie Barker (Forest Whitaker, 2017–2018)

Maya Landry-Lyon (Rhyon Nicole Brown, 2018–2020)
The daughter of Poundcake, Cookie Lyon's fellow inmate. In Season 5 she becomes Jamal's executive assistant, and later in Season 6 she becomes Andre's executive assistant. Also in Season 6 Maya and Hakeem start a friendly relationship and take a trip to Las Vegas; they get drunk and wake up the next day to find out they secretly got married overnight. They remain married for the rest of the series

Mercedes (Porscha Coleman, 2018)
Porsha's sexy and ambitious cousin. She has a street-hustle mentality and looks to exploit any avenue she can to jumpstart her budding singing/rap career.

Renee Holloway (Alfre Woodard, 2018)
Cookie Lyon’s estranged mother, who returns for a turbulent reunion. She is a photographer and a college instructor.

Kai Eugene Givens (Toby Onwumere, 2018)
A war correspondent and Jamal Lyon's love interest.

Quincy (Skylan Brooks, 2018)

Teri (Meta Golding, 2018)

Treasure (Katlynn Simone, 2018)

Damon Cross (Wood Harris, 2018)
International money launderer who crosses path with Lucious and Cookie Lyon.

Dr. Paula Wick (Keesha Sharp, 2019)
Smart, insightful woman who offers endless compassion but does not take crap from anyone.

Melody (Alexandra Grey, 2019)
Transgender singer and songwriter who was signed to Empire records by Lucious Lyon.

Lala (Diamond White, 2019)
Soft-spoken SoundCloud singer who sounds great online but is plagued with performance anxiety and cursed by an inability to sing in front of a crowd.

== Guest stars ==
The following is a supplementary list of guest stars, some recurring, who appear in lesser roles. The characters are listed, in alphabetical order by actor, by the season in which they first appeared.

Dwayne "Puma" Robinson (Cuba Gooding, Jr., 2015)
Songwriter and old associate of Lucious and Cookie.

Olivia Lyon (Raven-Symoné, 2015)
Background singer and former wife of Jamal Lyon.

Jermel Stubbs (DeRay Davis, 2015)
Cousin of Cookie Lyon, who was paid to kill a former associate of the family.

Delphine (Estelle, 2015; 2017)
Superstar singer who gets signed to Empire by Lucious.

Elle Dallas (Courtney Love, 2015)

Angie (Mary J. Blige, 2015)
A woman from Lucious Lyon's past.

Michelle White (Jennifer Hudson, 2015)
Music therapist and gospel singer

Frank Gathers (Chris Rock, 2015)
Drug kingpin who Lucious and Cookie Lyon worked for in the past.

Officer McKnight (Ludacris, 2015)
Security guard at Lucious' prison.

Clyde (Petey Pablo, 2015)
Prison-mate of Lucious Lyon.

Valentina Galindo (Becky G, 2015)
Aspiring singer and fling of Hakeem Lyon.

Skye Summers (Alicia Keys, 2015)
Pop singer and fling of Jamal Lyon.

Jezzy (Da Brat, 2015)
One of Cookie Lyon's prison-mates.

Pepper O'Leary (Rosie O'Donnell, 2015)
Cookie Lyon's former cellmate for over a decade.

Vaughn Cooper (French Montana, 2016)
Entertainment mogul and acquaintance of Lucious Lyon.

Kitty (Mariah Carey, 2016)
Superstar singer who works with Jamal.

Carlotta Brown (Queen Latifah, 2017)
The owner of an Atlanta beauty salon, who worked with Mary Davis in the R&B duo Mixed Harmony back in the 1990s. She becomes a surrogate mother to the three girls, even though she does not approve of their musical dreams. At the end of the first season, she takes over as manager from Jahil. Carlotta is a friend of Lucious's from back in the day.

Haven Quinn (Cassie Ventura, 2018)
A movie star that Hakeem briefly dates to make Tiana jealous.

Tracy Kingsley (Amanda Detmer, 2018–2020)
Jeff Kingsley's estranged mother and a recovering drug addict who is also a former flame of Lucious. After disowning Jeff, the latter of which commits suicide, Tracy is forced to have her son's heart transplanted into Andre. She blames Lucious for causing his death and soon plots to take her revenge on him. While holding Lucious and Cookie at gunpoint as he signs divorce papers, Andre walks in and quickly disarms Tracy, allowing Cookie to shoot her in self defense, killing Tracy and ending her vendetta against Lucious.

Additionally, Snoop Dogg, Sway Calloway, Anthony Hamilton, Fantastic Negrito, Gladys Knight, Rita Ora, Juicy J, Patti LaBelle, Charles Hamilton, Pitbull, Timbaland, Sharon Carpenter, Ne-Yo, Funkmaster Flex, Nicole Richie, Joel Madden, Jason Derulo, Lee Daniels, Montana of 300, Birdman, Remy Ma, Sticky Fingaz, Chaka Khan, Ty Dolla Sign and Sevyn Streeter make appearances as themselves.
