= The Truth About Jussie Smollett? =

2025 documentary film

- Netflix release poster
- Directed by: Gagan Rehill
- Based on: Jussie Smollett hate crime hoax
- Produced by: Tom Sheahan; Tim Wardle
- Edited by: Kevin Austin
- Music by: Rob Manning
- Production company: Raw TV
- Distributed by: Netflix
- Release date: 22 August 2025
- Running time: 90 minutes
- Countries: United States; United Kingdom
- Language: English

The Truth About Jussie Smollett? is a 2025 documentary film for Netflix, directed by Gagan Rehill and produced by Raw TV. The film revisits the 2019 incident in which actor Jussie Smollett reported being the victim of a hate crime in Chicago and the ensuing police investigation, media coverage, criminal case, and political fallout.

The movie was released on Netflix on 22 August 2025, featuring Smollett's first extended on-camera account of the case since 2019. It also includes interviews with Chicago police officials, journalists, lawyers, and the Osundario brothers, whose statements were central to the prosecution's theory.

== Synopsis ==
Early morning of 29 January 2019, actor Jussie Smollett reported to Chicago police that he had been attacked by two masked men who shouted racist and homophobic slurs before placing a noose around his neck. News of the alleged hate crime quickly spread, drawing statements of solidarity from celebrities, politicians, and advocacy groups. Early footage of Smollett on stage at a concert just days later, as well as clips of supportive headlines and social media posts, establish the climate of sympathy that initially surrounded his case.

Police investigation, introduces surveillance footage and the accounts of Chicago Police Department detectives. Investigators describe their growing suspicions about inconsistencies in Smollett’s story and detail how evidence, including video recordings and ride-hailing records, led them to identify brothers Abimbola and Olabinjo Osundairo. CPD testimony with commentary from journalists who covered the case, illustrated how quickly the narrative shifted from one of victimhood to doubt and skepticism.

The third act focuses heavily on the Osundairo brothers themselves. In extended interviews, they recount their past friendship with Smollett and claim that he orchestrated the attack to generate publicity. Archival courtroom footage and prosecutors’ arguments are used to illustrate the prosecution’s case during Smollett’s 2021 trial for disorderly conduct and filing false police reports. At the same time, commentary is given by legal analysts who question the reliability of the brothers’ testimony, leaving room for ambiguity in the viewer’s interpretation.

Attention then shifts to Smollett’s defense and the wider social context. Smollett appears in a sit-down interview, reflecting on the personal cost of the accusations and maintaining that he did not fabricate the attack. Supporters interviewed in the film argue that systemic racism and homophobia in policing influenced the investigation, while critics stress the damage the case caused to public trust. By presenting opposing perspectives, the documentary highlights the polarized reactions that have defined public discourse since 2019.

The documentary examines the Illinois Supreme Court’s November 2024 decision to overturn Smollett’s conviction on due-process grounds, while emphasizing that the ruling did not equate to a declaration of innocence. The closing montage sets against media clips, courtroom images, and Smollett’s own words, underscoring its refusal to provide a definitive answer. Instead, viewers are invited to weigh the conflicting accounts.

== Production ==
On 22 July, Netflix ordered a 90-minute documentary titled The Truth About Jussie Smollett?, which focuses on the controversy surrounding Smollett's staged hate crime case. The film features a new interview with Smollett, conducted six years after the events first drew widespread public attention. Netflix described the film as “a shocking true story of an allegedly fabricated account.”

According to trade coverage, Netflix greenlit the film from RAW after the company’s prior success on high-profile true-crime features, early reports framed the project as an attempt to re-examine the case with “new evidence” and previously unseen footage. TheWrap and Realscreen provided industry background on RAW’s involvement and the framing used in marketing materials.

The documentary features interviews with Jussie Smollett, the Osundairo brothers, former Chicago police officials, lawyers, and journalists, and incorporates police body-camera footage and other evidence discussed during the investigation. Director Gagan Rehill said he intended the film to present competing interpretations of the case and allow viewers to reach their own conclusions. The filmmakers described a research-led writing process that made use of public court records, media coverage, surveillance and archival footage, and on-camera interviews.

During promotion of the documentary, Smollett said it includes previously unreleased footage obtained through Freedom of Information Act requests by investigative journalists. He said his legal team received the footage only days before his 2021 trial, preventing it from being introduced as evidence. He stated: "[The footage] was brought to my lawyers a couple days before we started trial and they were like, ‘Yeah, we already got our defense, so it’s too late to bring that in, we can’t do anything about it".

== Release ==
Netflix released the documentary on 22 August 2025; the Netflix Media Center lists a U.S. release at 12:00 a.m. PT on that date. The title card and synopsis appear on Netflix’s consumer listing. The film was widely covered in entertainment press roundups of that weekend’s streaming releases.

== Reception ==
=== Critical response ===
Early critical reaction was mixed. Writing for The Guardian Hannah J Davies criticized the film’s speculative framing while acknowledging its access to key figures, calling it “bold, shocking … and utter nonsense.” Ed Power of The Daily Telegraph gave it 3 out of 5 stars, writing that “the evidence is inconclusive.” Variety’s Daniel D’Addario wrote that the documentary "gathers plenty of raw reporting" but is "undone by the challenges its particular story presents", criticizing its ambiguous tone and "soggy and obvious" presentation. Time noted that director Gagan Rehill deliberately avoided delivering conclusions, saying: “I want people to come away… we live in a society now where these two truths can exist next to each other.” The film was commended for showcasing both supporting and skeptical viewpoints without privileging either.

Jacob Oller of The A.V. Club described the documentary as "wishy-washy," suggesting it offered no clear viewpoint, instead serving as a "Rorschach test mess" that reinforced divisiveness rather than clarifying the case.

Karina Adelgaard of Heaven of Horror offered a more positive review, awarding the film 4 out of 5 stars. The reviewer praised its comprehensive coverage of all key perspectives, including Smollett, police, journalists, and the Osundairo brothers and emphasized the effectiveness of the title’s question mark in reflecting the elusiveness of truth.

== Reaction and controversy ==
The documentary's release prompted immediate debate. Several critics faulted the film for promoting speculative lines of inquiry including suggestions that Chicago police mishandled or tampered with evidence, without clear supporting proof, a criticism emphasized in major reviews.

The film’s director Gagan Rehill’s decision to present competing accounts rather than assert a definitive conclusion produced polarized audience reaction at early screenings and online, with some viewers saying the documentary reinforced their skepticism of Smollett and others saying it raised legitimate questions about the investigation.

Smollett publicly maintained prior to the film’s release that the documentary contains never-before-seen footage that, he said, corroborates his account, statements that were widely reported and became part of the pre-release conversation around the film. People magazine also reported Smollett saying in the film that he felt “extremely emasculated” by the public’s reaction to the alleged attack and reiterated that his payment to the Osundairo brothers was for an herbal supplement not to stage a crime.

Commentators also placed the film in the background of the case’s complex legal history, including Smollett’s 2021 conviction and the Illinois Supreme Court’s 21 November 2024, decision to overturn that conviction on due-process grounds, noting that the ruling did not equate to a finding of factual innocence and that the legal backdrop contributed to the intensity of public reaction.
