= Jamal Lyon =

- Empire character
- Portrayed by: Jussie Smollett
- Duration: 2015–2019
- First appearance: "Pilot" (2015)
- Last appearance: "Never Doubt I Love" (2019)
- Created by: Lee Daniels and Danny Strong
In-universe information
- Occupation: Singer-Songwriter; Former CEO of Empire Enterprises
- Father: Lucious Lyon
- Mother: Cookie Lyon
- Brothers: Andre Lyon; Hakeem Lyon
- Half-brothers: Jeff Kingsley
- Spouse: Kai Givens; Olivia Lyon
- Children: Lola Lyon
- Grandfathers: Joe Walker; John Holloway
- Grandmothers: Leah Walker; Renee Holloway
- Uncles: Tariq Cousins
- Aunts: Candace Holloway; Carol Holloway
- Nephews: Prince Lyon; Walker Lyon
- Nieces: Bella Lyon; Princess Lyon (deceased)
- First cousins: Luther Holloway; Keisha Holloway; Tanya Holloway; Brianna; Franklin
- Other relatives: Bunkie Williams; Jermel; Rhonda Lyon; Teri Brooks

Jamal Joseph Lyon is a fictional character from the American musical drama, Empire on Fox. Portrayed by Jussie Smollett, Jamal is the middle son of hip-hop mogul Lucious (Terrence Howard) and his wife Cookie (Taraji P. Henson). Jamal, a talented R&B singer and songwriter, struggles to gain his father's approval, but is able to overcome this adversity with Cookie's support. He initially expresses resentment towards fame and is hesitant to be in the limelight, but he gradually embraces it once Cookie begins to manage his career. Jamal engages in what was once a friendly competition against his younger brother and best friend Hakeem (Bryshere Y. Gray) to determine who is more musically gifted, while maintaining a cold distance from his older brother Andre (Trai Byers) for his perpetual scheming. Jamal struggles with his father's objection to his homosexuality, which was inspired by Empire creator Lee Daniels' own relationship with his father.

In 2019, Smollett was fired from Empire after staging a fake hate crime, and Jamal was written out off the series' final season, said to be in London.

== Storylines ==
Jamal Lyon was born to Lucious (Terrence Howard) and Cookie Lyon (Taraji P. Henson), in Philadelphia, Pennsylvania, as the second of three sons. Jamal grew up with his brothers, father, and mother; his parents were selling drugs in the Philadelphia ghetto they lived in to finance Lucious' music career. As a child, he began to dress in women's clothing, which caused his father to throw him outside into a trash can in an effort to curb his homosexuality. In school, other children didn't like his sexuality and constantly bullied him. When Cookie was arrested for selling drugs, Jamal was the only family member that visited her in jail. Once Lucious made it big as a rapper and started Empire Entertainment, Jamal became a singer signed to the company. Despite his talent, he refuses to tour and prefers to perform for small audiences in local clubs. Jamal lives with his boyfriend Michael Sanchez (Rafael de la Fuente), a relationship of which his father strongly disapproves.

When Cookie is released from prison, she immediately visits Jamal, who lives with his boyfriend which Lucious highly neglects. She becomes his manager and convinces him to start touring and to start recording an album. Jamal becomes more independent by moving out of the expensive apartment his father paid for and into an apartment in the projects. During a recording session at a nearby studio, Jamal is held at gunpoint and nearly robbed by some of Hakeem's associates, until the studio engineer runs them off with his shotgun. Jamal confronts Hakeem over the incident and punches him, although it was in fact Andre who had set up Jamal to be robbed and staged it to appear as though Hakeem was behind it.

Jamal is visited by his ex-wife Olivia (Raven-Symoné), who informs him that he is the father of her daughter Lola. Jamal begins to bond with Lola and spends time singing to her. He and Hakeem patch up their relationship and perform together at a concert hosted by Empire Entertainment, after which Lucious reveals to them that he has ALS. Shortly afterwards, Cookie tells Jamal that she has gotten back together with Lucious, but he warns her that nothing good can come from loving his father. Michael leaves Jamal after his father refuses to acknowledge his sexuality and his relationship with Michael in public. Jamal enters a new relationship with Ryan Morgan (Eka Darville), who is hired by Lucious to film a documentary on his life. Upon Ryan's encouragement, Jamal comes out as gay to the public during a performance of Lucious' song "You're so Beautiful", which causes Lucious to cancel the upcoming family album that he planned to do with Jamal and Hakeem.

Later, during a family dinner at Lucious' house, Olivia's jealous boyfriend Reg breaks into the house and points a gun at Jamal. He demands Lola back, but Jamal angrily refuses to back down. Reg pulls a gun on Cookie when she tries to protect him, but Lucious comes forward to admit that Lola is his daughter. Before Reg can shoot Lucious, the family's personal head of security, Malcolm DeVeaux (Derek Luke) shoots Reg in the head, instantly killing him.

Jamal takes Lucious to the old Philadelphia home in which he grew up. Jamal accuses Lucious of losing his edge after becoming famous, but Lucious responds that Jamal doesn't know what it means to come from a rough background. However, Lucious ultimately recognizes Jamal's talent and decides to give him the CEO position. A jealous Hakeem and Andre plot against him with the help of Cookie. They also get Lucious' ex-fiancé and Hakeem's lover Anika Calhoun (Grace Gealey) to assist them. Meanwhile, Jamal threatens Billy Beretti into releasing the masters of Lucious's early records. Jamal refuses to allow Hakeem to push up his album release date, not wanting to put the album out too soon after his own. This causes further friction between the two, with Hakeem and Andre plotting to overthrow Jamal after Lucious is arrested for Bunkie's murder. Jamal believes that Cookie is responsible and blames her, but finds the strength to perform at Empire's celebratory concert in honor of going public on the NYSE.

== Creation and development ==
Smollett revealed that he formed a bond with Daniels and felt that because the character is loosely based on Lee Daniels own life, "whoever was going to play Jamal had to be able to bond with Lee because at the end of the day, Jamal is so close to Lee's heart that you had to tell it the way that he was truthful." Jamal's character development has been influenced by Michael Corleone of the 1972 film The Godfather. Danny Strong went on to say of the character's change throughout Season one, "[w]e always had this Michael Corleone-esque arc planned for [Jamal] where we were going to see, over the course of the season, him slowly start to turn into this father. That’s ultimately why his father chooses to make him the heir. Because he, at the end of the day, is the most like him." Ilene Chaiken stated that Jamal has always been "a Michael Corleone character". She continued, "[w]e want to see him rise to the occasion, surprise everyone by being the most cunning, the most gangster at the end of the day." Lee Daniels also thought that having Jamal's character arc being influenced by Michael defied "the stereotypical gay man up against something, and being a victim". He replied of the character, "He is (The Godfather’s) Michael Corleone, and he is his father’s son."

=== Casting and portrayal ===
"It’s such a script that carries so much heart and carries so much truth. I keep saying this, that this is the Lee Daniels’ way. I think that any actor, any artist period, would love to work with an artist like Lee Daniels. Because what he and Danny Strong have done by creating this show, is really, I felt like what they were doing is they weren't preaching, yet they were getting such important messages out there about acceptance, about sexuality, about mental disorders, but about family. At its core, it’s about family, and family and music, personally, is my life. So, it just told a story that I relate to, and also a story that I want to tell. So, that’s why."

— Jussie Smollett on what appealed to him about the show.

On February 26, 2014, it was announced that former child star and singer Jussie Smollett known for his appearance in the 1992 Disney film, The Mighty Ducks and the short lived ABC sitcom On Our Own had been cast in the role of Jamal Lyon, the middle son of hip-hop mogul Lucious (Terrence Howard) and his ex-wife Cookie (Taraji P. Henson). Jamal is judged and rejected by Lucious because he is gay which is why he tries to avoid the spotlight, despite his exceptional talent as a singer and songwriter. Jamal "struggles with his identity and his sexuality". Smollett's sister sent him a link about the casting call and he immediately contacted his manager about it. Smollett went through the usual audition process but admitted that he immediately "connected" with the script. Because of its premise, it provided Smollett with the opportunity to act, dance, sing and write music which is what he does for a living. Smollett sent the show's creator Lee Daniels a message on Instagram and said "I know you get this all the time, but I really feel that I'm Jamal Lyon." Smollett said he thought his message made Daniels take notice of him. Smollett admitted he didn't expect Daniels would see the message. However, Daniels responded the night before the audition. At his audition the following week, Smollett performed for Daniels. Daniels referred to Smollett as a "smart little kitten" for reaching out to him directly. Smollett came back seven times and said Daniels "made me sing for my life". Of the extensive casting process, Smollett said Daniels wanted to make sure that his portrayal of Jamal was "1000 percent truthful" and "organic and authentic and real". Smollett said "It was a tough audition process, but there has never been a project that I've done that has been so rewarding."

=== Personality and sexuality ===
Upon the announcement of Smollett's casting, the character of Jamal was described as "sensitive soul and musical prodigy that could easily rise to superstardom if he desires". Smollett described his character as the "heart" and the most level-headed of the Lyon family. Jamal is very loyal to those who are good to him, as he is the only person to visit his mother during her prison stint. However, Jamal avoids the spotlight because he does not want to be like Lucious. Smollett said Jamal is a very "internal person". Smollett agreed with Jamal being the show's "moral center" at least for the time being. Smollett described Jamal as the perfect blend of his parents. "He's got the edge of his father, he's got the heart of his mother." "He's very, very brave" Smollett said of his character. The actor continued, "That's what people love about him, that he's so vulnerable but yet so, so brave and so strong…. Jamal is all about these bold subtleties of strength." Jamal is arguably the most talented member of his family. He is a singer and songwriter. According to Jussie Smollett, Jamal "struggles with knowing how good he is but he isn't sure if he wants to pursue a full fledged career as a performer because of the "scrutiny and the judgement that comes with it". Smollett explained that Jamal's music is very similar to his own. Jamal prefers to keep his music "pure".

"[Homophobia] is so real and it is happening to so many people, has happened to so many people... To children and young people that are questioning their sexuality or know for their sexuality, if they can look at someone and see themselves in Jamal, that's incredible. I embrace that fully."

— Jussie Smollett, Television Critics Association Winter Preview (2015)

Jamal's sexuality is a point of contention very early on for him and his father, while his mother sees the signs and loves him anyway. Lee Daniels made a conscious effort to remove the "stereotype" from Jamal's sexuality. "Look... there are all different types of gay people" Daniels remarked. Smollett said the show is "not shoving anything down your throat. It's not preaching, it's not telling you the way you should feel about a certain issue, but it is giving you options. Lee [Daniels] holds up the mirror to us as human beings." Thanks to his own experience as a gay man, Daniels is able to construct the world of Empire around Jamal who is written as a "down-the-middle, well-mannered, even-keeled, guy-next-door type". Daniels wanted to "normalize" gay romances, specifically between men of color. Show runner Ilene Chaiken said "We're going to go places with Jamal that are unexpected and that you've never seen a television show go – certainly not on a broadcast television show – with a gay black character... Maybe not with any gay character, frankly." Daniels said "Homophobia is rampant in the African-American community" and using the character of Jamal, "I wanted to blow the lid off it." "We are behind closed doors in a family situation and trying to tell it as honestly as possible. The things my father said to me because of homophobia frightened the devil out of me." said Terrence Howard. He continued, "What we're really trying to do... is give people an opportunity to see what they're doing is painful. It's crushing someone that could be beautiful." The scene in which Lucious throws a 4-year-old Jamal into a trash can after Jamal dresses up in Cookie's heels comes from actual events from Daniels own childhood. While Jamal's sexuality is known in his personal life, Ilene Chaiken explained that Jamal is "coming out to the world which not everybody gets". However, it would be very difficult for Jamal not only as an artist, but also as the son of someone with such fame. In addition, Jamal is black and he is a part of the hip-hop community. This is a "very, very big deal and it's a huge story to tell" Chaiken said. However, Jamal wants to come out on his own terms, and that causes some trouble for him. According to Smollett, Jamal changes his mind about coming out in episode 102, "The Outspoken King" because "It just wasn't the right time for him, especially to do it in such a grand way – with the press conference and the performance. That was a show! That's not Jamal."

In season 2, Jamal has a fling with Skye Summers (Alicia Keys). There was controversy on social media and some members of the gay community criticized the show for homophobia for featuring a gay male character having a tryst with a woman. Smollett responded to the controversy by saying that "Jamal is a gay man having a bisexual experience...No one is saying he has fallen in love with Skye. But if you're gonna go straight for anybody, it should be for the sexy and brilliant Alicia Keys. I mean, Bruh!" He claimed that the gay community would have applauded the decision to depict a straight male character experimenting with a man, so there was nothing wrong with depicting a gay character experimenting with a woman Smollet knew that there would be controversy, but accepted the challenge because it was a "conversation that I didn't mind having and I didn't mind opening up....We're still having that conversation, and in this second part of season two we do really tap in on the idea of sexual fluidity." Lee Daniels stated that he and Jussie Smollett are both gay men, but occasionally sleep with women, and that the plot development was an attempt to spark discussion about sexual fluidity:

Jussie and I both share the same feeling that, yes, even though we are gay, we’re sexual human beings...And we do occasionally want to sleep with a woman. [Laughs] Maybe once every 10 or 15 years, but it happens! And there are a lot of people who don't want to hear about that. It's such a complicated conversation. It's not necessarily the body one is attracted to. You can be sexually attracted to the spirit, the energy, the life force in another person. We're showing life on Empire, and I won't apologize for it.

=== Relationships ===
Though Jamal initially shies away from being a superstar, Cookie's release provides the support he needs for him to "come out of his shell" when she becomes his "momager". Smollett bonded with Taraji P. Henson who played Cookie and admits that the "dynamic between Cookie and Jamal" stems from their real life friendship. Jussie Smollett said that Lucious starts to gain a bit more respect for Jamal. Because of his determination, Lucious realizes Jamal is the one most like him, despite the fact that he is gay. "That's the journey that they go on and they come to an understanding" Smollett said. "They're always going to [be] butting heads and punching the air but at the same time, there is a point where Jamal becomes a man" and says "He, this is it." Jamal starts to stand up to Lucious "but still in a very grown-man way. He's standing his ground. He's not afraid of Lucious, and that speaks volumes as to the man that he is and about the man he's becoming" Smollett said. "You definitely see him stepping up and protecting himself, and not letting Lucious just spew things without putting him in check." According to Smollett, the strong connection displayed between Jamal and his brothers, Andre (Trai Byers) and Hakeem (Bryshere Y. Gray) is because of his closeness with his co-stars. "You really want to protect [Gray] in the same in the same way Jamal wants to protect Hakeem."

In the pilot, the series introduces Jamal living with his boyfriend Michael Sanchez (Rafael de la Fuente). Jussie Smollett said that he is very close with his co-star de la Fuente, and that comes across onscreen. However, the dynamics of that loving relationship would change when Jamal starts "changing". The character of Olivia (Raven-Symoné) was introduced in the episode "Out, Damned Spot," and is revealed to be the gay Jamal's ex-wife. "It was all just a sham" Smollett said of Jamal and Olivia's marriage. Though Jamal's is not in love with Olivia, "it was what he felt he needed to do and another way that Lucious handled the puppeteering of Jamal early on in his life." To make matters more complicated, Olivia claims that Jamal fathered her young daughter, Lola. However, Olivia's sudden reemergence in the wake of his new success makes everyone suspicious. At the same time, Jamal is struggling to balance his success with his relationship when he passes up the chance to acknowledge his sexuality and his relationship with Michael interview. At the same time, Jamal immediately bonds with Olivia's daughter Lola (Leah Jeffries) whom he is initially led to believe is his own child. When the family is confronted by Olivia's abusive boyfriend Reg, "It's Jamal's moment where he has fallen in love with this child so quickly." He even forgoes a DNA test to prove he is Lola's father. "Jamal wants to be a father, and he's displaying that rage and that fire that only parents can have."

== Reception ==
"Within the show’s first hour, hateful slurs are directed toward [Jamal], and in one flashback to Jamal’s childhood Lucious stuffs him into in a garbage can for prancing around in heels and a scarf. Those scenes are jarring and painful to watch—but also necessary."

— Gerrick Kennedy on the extreme mistreatment of Jamal by other characters.

The character of Jamal received universal widespread critical acclaim. In regard to the writing for Jamal, Kelley L. Carter from BuzzFeed declared that "Being Gay and Black on TV will never be the same." Renaldo Christopher said Jamal was the show's "least archetypal" character. "Jussie Smollett’s restraint, in particular, is the show’s singular grounding asset." "[Empire] makes its boldest statement with a single character" said Gerrick D. Kennedy of Jamal. Kennedy continued with "for a show steeped in a genre that has a history of homophobia, "Empire feels groundbreaking." Kennedy said featuring Jamal "who isn't a stereotype or comic relief is bold enough in its own right" but because the show is set in Hip Hop, it feels "like a game changer". Kennedy continued his praise of the character and said "I've waited a lifetime to see a character like Jamal in prime time. A young black man powered by R&B and hip–hop who is unashamed of who he is and in a loving, same-sex relationship isn't a revolutionary idea in the real world. But in the realm of television and radio it could be." 2Paragraphs responded with the headline, "Fox's 'Empire' Uses "Faggot" As Badge of Honor" and said it "takes the show to a place Fox hasn't gone before". Jeff Portwood of Out magazine hailed Smollett as one of the show's breakout stars. "The abuse from Howard and Henson's empathy toward their son could be lifechanging for millions of little boys and girls across the country. Bravo, Daniels!" Portwood declared. Though he saw the show as "cheesy," Portwood said "we'll rely on Smollett to deliver the goods – as he did when he sang in the first episode."
