= Empire: Original Soundtrack Season 3 =

Soundtrack album by Various artists
- Released: April 28, 2017
- Genres: Hip hop; R&B; pop
- Label: Columbia

Empire: Original Soundtrack Season 3 is the fourth soundtrack album by the cast of the musical drama television series Empire which airs on Fox. The album includes songs that featured during the third season of the show. It was released on April 28, 2017.

== Track listing ==
Empire: Original Soundtrack Season 3
No.	Title	Length
1.	"Need Freedom" (Jussie Smollett)	3:48
2.	"Infamous" (Mariah Carey and Jussie Smollett)	3:35
3.	"Aces High" (Serayah)	2:27
4.	"Over Everything" (Jussie Smollett and Yazz)	3:13
5.	"Mama" (Stripped Down Version) (Jussie Smollett)	3:24
6.	"Black Girl Magic" (Sierra McClain and Serayah)	3:41
7.	"Starlight" (Hakeem Version) (Serayah and Yazz)	3:16
8.	"Get Me Right" (Sierra McClain, Serayah and Yazz)	2:50
9.	"All In" (Serayah and Yazz)	3:01
10.	"I Got You" (Jussie Smollett, Yazz and Serayah)	2:43
11.	"Special" (Yazz)	3:15
12.	"Crazy Crazy 4 U" (Rumer Willis)	2:37
13.	"The Father the Sun (Rap Remix)" (Jussie Smollett and Fetty Wap)	3:28
14.	"We Got Us" (Jussie Smollett)	3:22
15.	"Dream On with You" (Terrence Howard)	3:34
