= Jussie Smollett hate crime hoax =

2019 hate crime hoax

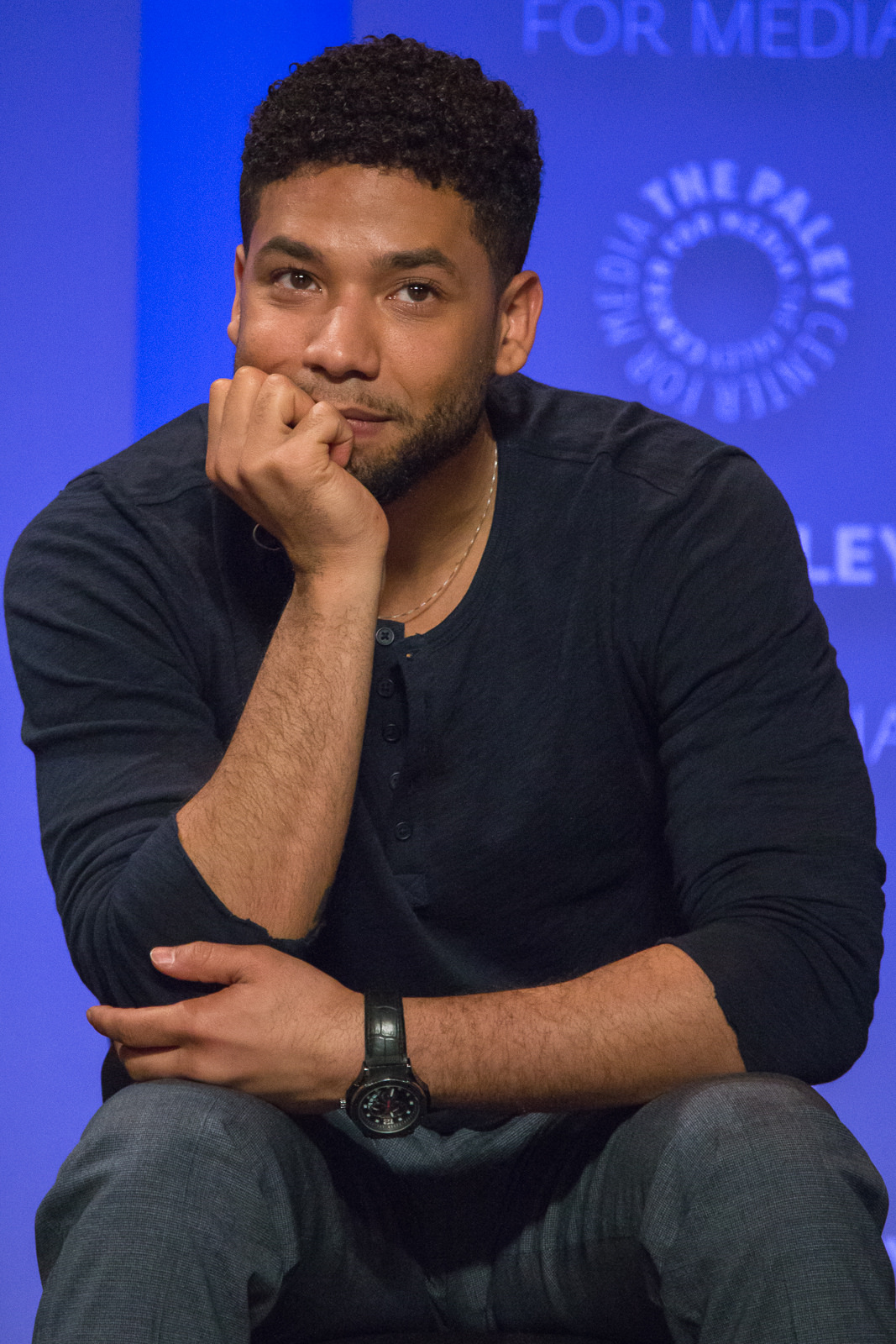
Jussie Smollett in 2016

On January 29, 2019, American actor Jussie Smollett approached the Chicago Police Department and reported a fake hate crime that he had staged against himself earlier that morning. He enlisted two Nigerian-American brothers, Abimbola and Olabinjo Osundairo, who had worked with him on the television drama Empire, to plan and execute the hoax. The hoax took place on East Lower North Water Street in Chicago's Streeterville neighborhood. In disguise the brothers shouted racial and homophobic slurs while one poured bleach on Smollett and the other placed a noose around his neck. Smollett described one of them as a white male and told police he shouted "This is MAGA country". The brothers later testified that Smollett staged the attack near a surveillance camera so that video of it could be publicized.

In February 2019, a Chicago police raid on the home of the Osundairo brothers uncovered evidence they had been paid $3,500 by Smollett and purchased the rope found around Smollett's neck, and police also found clothing-store security camera footage of the brothers buying clothes like those worn by the attackers. Smollett was indicted for disorderly conduct for paying the brothers to stage a fake hate crime and filing a false police report. His defense team reached a plea bargain with prosecutors in March 2019, in which all charges were dropped in return for Smollett performing community service and forfeiting his $10,000 bond.

In February 2020, after further investigation by a special prosecutor, Smollett was indicted again by a Cook County grand jury on six counts pertaining to making four false police reports. In December 2021, Smollett was convicted on five felony counts. In March 2022, Smollett was sentenced to 150 days in county jail and was ordered to pay $120,106 in restitution for the overtime spent by Chicago police officers investigating his false reports. Smollett's attorneys immediately filed an appeal and he was released after posting a personal recognizance bond.

In November 2024, the Supreme Court of Illinois overturned Smollett's conviction. The court agreed that Smollett's Fifth Amendment rights had been violated when he was prosecuted again after the earlier plea bargain. In response, special prosecutor Dan Webb said that Smollett is "not innocent," and noted that during the appeal, Smollett's defense never challenged the "overwhelming evidence presented at trial that Mr. Smollett orchestrated a fake hate crime and reported it to the Chicago Police Department". In the 2025 Netflix documentary The Truth About Jussie Smollett?, Smollett maintains that he is innocent.

== Staged hate crime ==
On January 22, 2019, a letter arrived at the Chicago studio of Smollett's employer. The letter was addressed to Smollett and had a drawing depicting a stick figure hanging from a tree with a gun pointing towards it, as well as lettered magazine clippings reading "Smollett, Jussie you will die" and "MAGA". The letter also contained a white powder determined to be Tylenol.

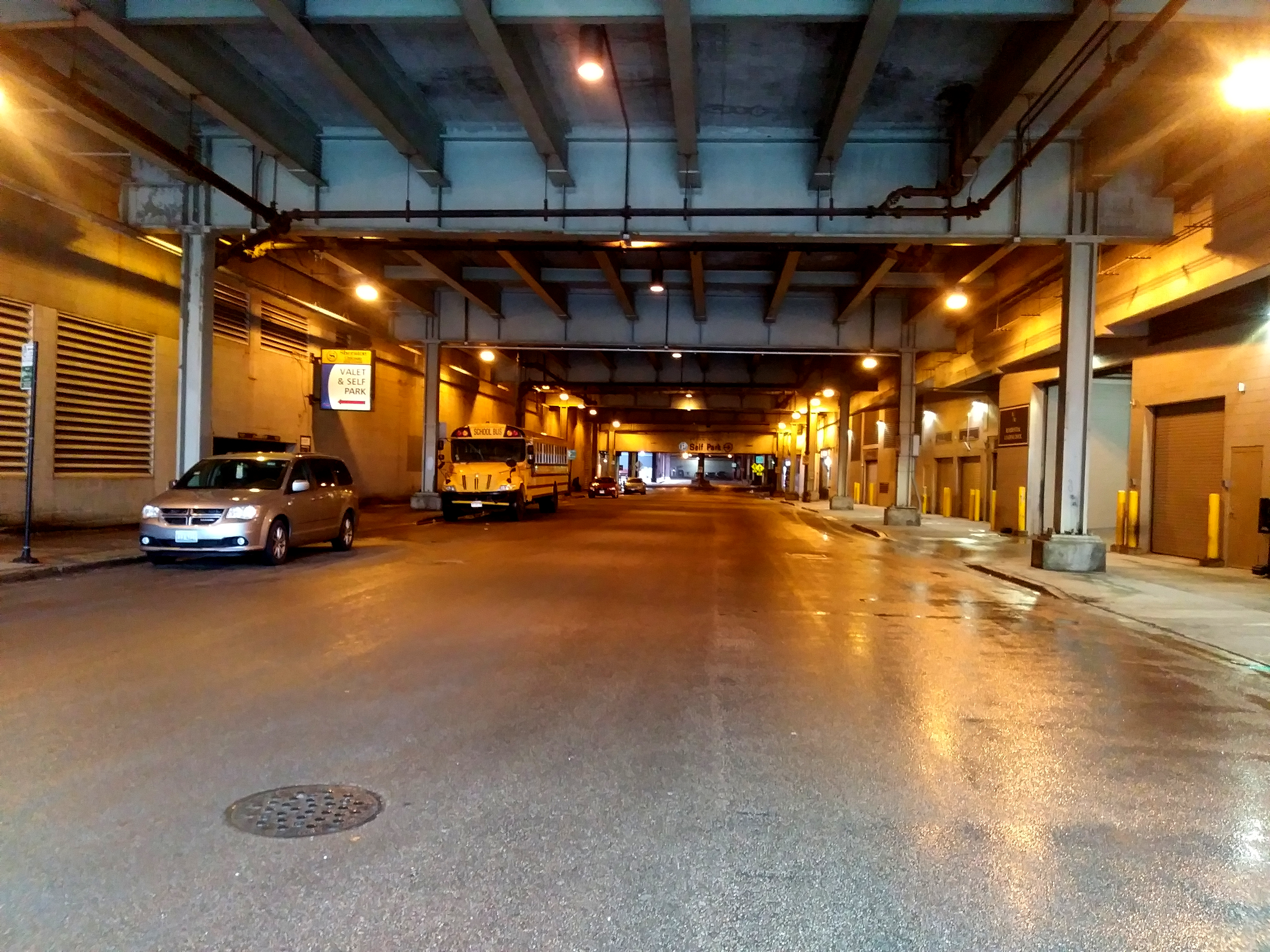
The 300 block of East Lower North Water Street, the location of the alleged hate crime

On January 29, Smollett announced that he had been attacked early that morning on the 300 block of East Lower North Water Street in Chicago's Streeterville neighborhood, in what was initially investigated as a hate crime. Chicago police later alleged that Smollett himself was responsible for staging the attack.

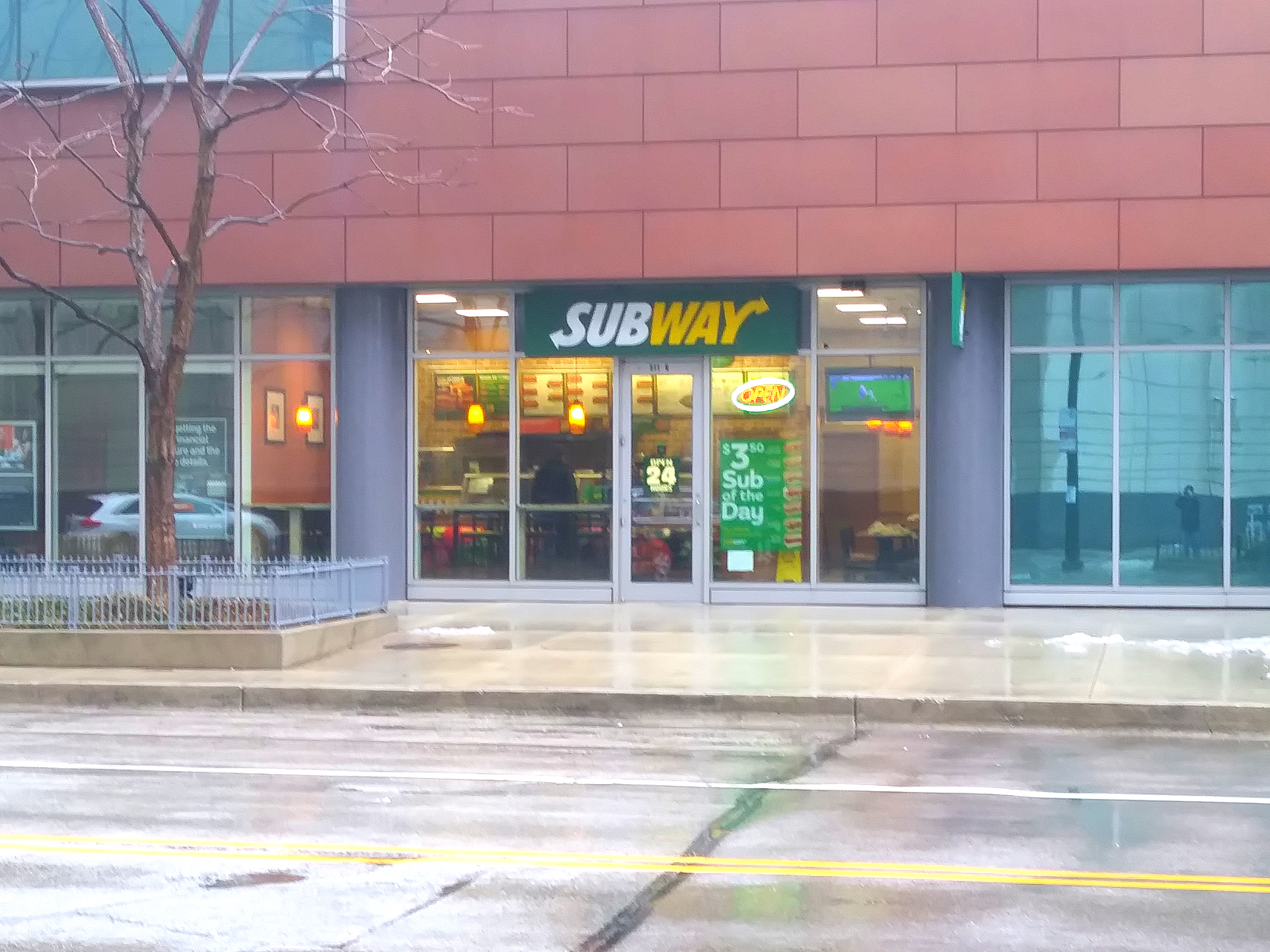
The Subway restaurant where Smollett said he bought food before the attack

Smollett told police that, after getting food from a Subway restaurant around 2:00 a.m., he was attacked by two men, who were "yelling out racial and homophobic slurs" and who "poured an unknown chemical substance on [him]". Smollett said that he was on the phone with his manager, Frank Gatson, at the time of the purported incident.

He described one of the assailants as White, though both were Black. They allegedly began to beat Smollett about the face, using their hands, feet, and teeth as weapons in the assault. According to a statement released by Chicago police, the two suspects then "poured an unknown chemical substance on the victim" and at some point during the incident "wrapped a rope around the victim's neck". Smollett said that he fought them off. There were surveillance cameras at the location that Smollett assumed had captured the incident, but, as it turned out, they were facing in the wrong direction. A witness, an employee of NBC News Chicago, who was near the scene of Smollett's alleged incident and was exiting her car around the "corner from the location," said that she heard nothing.

According to Gloria Rodriguez, the lawyer for the assailants, Smollett first drove them to the spot where the attack was supposed to occur for a "dress rehearsal" and told them, "Here's a camera, there's a camera and here's where you are going to run away". The assailants explained that Smollett's plan was to post the footage on social media, and that he became very upset when police told him that no cameras had recorded the attack. Smollett was treated at Northwestern Memorial Hospital. Not seriously injured, he was released "in good condition" later that morning.

The police had been called after 2:30 a.m. by Gatson, which infuriated the actor because he did not want to involve law enforcement. When they arrived around 2:40 a.m., Smollett had a white rope around his neck. He later admitted removing the rope and then putting it back on before the police arrived after Gatson told him to do so. Smollett said that the attack may have been motivated by his criticism of the Trump administration and that he believed that the alleged assault was linked to the threatening letter that had been sent to him earlier that month. The FBI would later investigate whether Smollett was involved in composing the letter.

== Initial public reaction ==
On January 30, 2019, public figures expressed support for Smollett on social media. Entertainment industry figures, including Shonda Rhimes and Viola Davis, tweeted their outrage over the attack and support for Smollett. Democratic senators and presidential candidates Kamala Harris and Cory Booker both described the attack as an attempted modern-day lynching. Booker urged Congress to pass a federal anti-lynching bill co-sponsored by him and Harris. In an interview with April Ryan of AURN, President Donald Trump was asked about Smollett being attacked and said, "I think that's horrible. It doesn't get worse." Smollett faced skepticism regarding his claim of being attacked; he responded by saying that he believed that, if he had said his attackers were Mexicans, Muslims, or Black people, "the doubters would have supported me much more ... And that says a lot about the place that we are in our country right now."

== Investigation ==
On February 13, 2019, Chicago police raided the home of two "persons of interest" in the case. The men, Abimbola and Olabinjo Osundairo, were brothers of Nigerian descent who'd acted as extras on Empire, the television series in which Smollett was a main cast member. Police recovered bleach and other items from the home. The brothers were held in police custody on suspicion of battery but were not charged. According to their attorney, they knew Smollett from working on the show and had also spent time with him at a gym. The two men were released February 15 without being charged with a crime, with Chicago police spokesman Anthony Guglielmi stating their release was "due to new evidence" from the interrogations.

Chicago police later told ABC News: "Police are investigating whether the two individuals committed the attack—or whether the attack happened at all." On February 16, two unnamed police sources informed CNN that investigators had discovered evidence indicating that Smollett had paid the two brothers $3,500 to stage the attack. Financial records indicate that the brothers purchased the rope found around Smollett's neck at a hardware store in Ravenswood over the weekend of January 25. They were seen in security camera footage in a clothing store where they bought the gloves, ski masks and a red hat that police said was used in the attack. The brothers asked specifically for a MAGA hat, which the store did not sell. Chicago Police contacted Smollett's attorney for additional questioning.

On February 19, 2019, Cook County State's Attorney Kim Foxx said that she was recusing herself from the investigation due to her "familiarity with potential witnesses in the case", prompting criticism from her predecessor, Anita Alvarez. Foxx delegated the case to a subordinate. Foxx later acknowledged that she had been in contact with a member of Smollett's family about the case at an early stage when he was thought to have been a crime victim. Foxx added that Chicago Police Superintendent Eddie T. Johnson had reached out to the FBI about handing the Smollett case off to them, but had informed her that the agency was not interested. Foxx's office later asserted that she had not formally recused herself from the case; doing so would have required her to ask the court to appoint an outside attorney as a special prosecutor.

Smollett hired crisis manager Chris Bastardi to represent him.

== Criminal charges, arrest, trial and conviction ==
People v. Smollett
- Court: Circuit Court of Cook County
- Full case name: The People of the State of Illinois v. Jussie Smollett
- Decided: December 9, 2021; 4 years ago
- Verdict: Guilty on 5 of 6 counts of disorderly conduct for making a false report to the Chicago Police Department
- Prosecution: Dan K. Webb

Case history
- Subsequent actions: Smollett sentenced on March 10, 2022, to 150 days in jail (stayed pending appeal), 30 months of felony court probation, $120,106 restitution to Chicago, and $25,000 fine

Court membership
- Judge sitting: James Linn

On February 20, 2019, Smollett was charged by a grand jury with a class 4 felony for filing a false police report. Smollett's felony count charge in Illinois carries a maximum sentence of three years in prison. Smollett hired attorney Mark Geragos in addition to Chicago-based attorneys Todd Pugh and Victor Henderson to work on his legal defense.

The next day, Smollett surrendered himself at the Chicago Police Department's Central Booking station; shortly thereafter, CPD spokesman Anthony Guglielmi stated that Smollett "is under arrest and in the custody of detectives". Guglielmi also said that Smollett was named as a suspect in a criminal investigation for filing a fake police report, under a class 4 felony.

Later that day, Chicago Police Superintendent Eddie T. Johnson held a press conference, gave details of the investigation, and explained how the department concluded that the alleged assault was staged. The brothers, Abimbola "Bola" (also known as Abel) and Olabinjo "Ola" Osundairo, who say that they helped stage the attack, also said that Smollett came up with the idea to orchestrate the attack after the threatening letter that he received did not generate as much attention as he had hoped that it would. In addition to the rope around his neck, the original plan was to pour gasoline over him, but they decided to use bleach instead. Police alleged that the actor intended to further his career by tying the incident to racism in the United States and President Trump, and that Smollett sent himself the threatening letter.

Judge John Fitzgerald Lyke Jr. set Smollett's bail at $100,000; a friend of the actor's paid a $10,000 bond, and Smollett was released from custody on February 21. Smollett was required to surrender his passport.

Grand jury indictment

On March 8, Smollett was indicted on 16 felony counts of "false report of offense" related to the incident.

In March 2019, the New York Post reported that Tina Tchen, a Chicago attorney who served as former First Lady Michelle Obama's chief of staff, had contacted Cook County State's Attorney Kim Foxx about the Smollett case on February 1. Emails and text messages indicated that, on February 1, Foxx informed both Tchen and an unnamed Smollett relative that she had asked Police Superintendent Eddie Johnson to request that the FBI take over the Smollett investigation. Foxx added that Johnson had agreed to make that request.

On March 14, 2019, Smollett pled not guilty.

=== Initial charges dropped ===
On March 26, 2019, all charges filed against Smollett were dropped, with Judge Steven Watkins ordering the public court file sealed. First Assistant State's Attorney Joseph Magats said the office reached a deal with Smollett's defense team in which prosecutors would drop the charges in exchange for Smollett performing 16 hours of community service and forfeiting his $10,000 bond.

Police report files on Smollett's case

The Illinois Prosecutors Bar Association (IPBA) said that the dismissal was "highly unusual", and that the "manner in which this case was dismissed was abnormal and unfamiliar to those who practice law in criminal courthouses across the state. Prosecutors, defense attorneys, and judges alike do not recognize the arrangement Mr. Smollett received. Even more problematic, the State's Attorney and her representatives have fundamentally misled the public on the law and circumstances surrounding the dismissal." It described several of the statements made by the State's Attorney and her representatives regarding the handling of the case as false or misleading. The National District Attorneys Association released a statement saying that a prosecutor should not take advice from politically connected friends of the accused and should not recuse herself without recusing the entire office, and noted that "a case with the consequential effects of Mr. Smollett's should not be resolved without a finding of guilt or innocence."

Magats made a statement saying that the decision was not an exoneration of Smollett's: "We stand behind the investigation, we stand behind the decision to charge him [...] The fact that [Smollett] feels that we have exonerated him, we have not. I can't make it any clearer than that." Then-Mayor of Chicago Rahm Emanuel strongly criticized the decision, saying it was a "whitewash of justice" and that "From top to bottom, this is not on the level." Police superintendent Johnson said that justice was not served.

On March 27, 2019, the Chicago Police Department released the redacted police reports associated with the case. It was announced that the FBI is investigating why the charges were dismissed. The hearing to expunge Smollett's record was delayed on March 27. In April 2019, mayor-elect Lori Lightfoot said in a statement: "We've got a lot of things on our plate, a lot of pressing issues that are truly affecting people's lives. This doesn't rank as a matter of any importance to me."

=== Special prosecutor ===
On August 23, 2019, former United States Attorney Dan K. Webb was assigned as special prosecutor to review Jussie Smollett's case and the events leading to the charges being dropped. Webb was tasked with reviewing the original case and charges surrounding Smollett's claim of being attacked. He was also allowed to look into why Foxx had dropped all of the charges against Smollett. Shortly after being assigned as special prosecutor, possible conflicts of interest were raised after a $1,000 donation to Kim Foxx's campaign had surfaced. His work was put on hiatus as a hearing was called for to decide whether Webb should continue. In court, Judge Michael Toomin defended his appointment of Webb. The judge ruled Webb could continue to investigate as special prosecutor since his donation was "a routine practice of lawyers" and that it should have "no effect on his ability to be fair and impartial".

On December 6, 2019, a Cook County Circuit Court judge signed search warrants ordering Google to turn over Jussie Smollett's emails, photos, location data and private messages from November 2018 to November 2019, as part of the special prosecutor's investigation.

Webb announced new charges on February 11, 2020. Smollett was indicted on six counts of felony disorderly conduct for lying to the police. According to the special prosecutor, Smollett "faces six felony counts of disorderly conduct stemming from four separate false reports that he gave to police."

=== Trial and appeal ===
In March 2021, Smollett attempted to hire lawyer Nenye Uche to represent him, but prosecutors challenged the appointment with allegations of conflicts of interest. The allegations stem from claims made by the Osundairo brothers to prosecutors that Uche had spoken to them about the facts of the case in 2019, with the Osundairos later writing sworn affidavits to back up their claims. Uche has denied the allegations, saying he only met the Osundairos' mother and a family friend, and only to tell them he could not represent them because they already had representation.

As of October 16, 2021, a judge had denied the defense's request to dismiss the case. Jury selection for Smollett's trial took place on November 29, 2021. During the trial, Smollett's defense attorney accused the judge of attempting to attack her by physically lunging at her during a sidebar; another Smollett attorney has previously made accusations of the judge making faces and snarling throughout the trial. The judge denied the claim as well as her motion for a mistrial. During the 2021 trial, the prosecution revealed video footage of Smollett and the two "attackers" in a car a few days before the attack. When questioned, Smollett testified that he had arranged to work out with Abimbola Osundairo but cancelled the workout when Olabinjo Osundairo had shown up uninvited. Prosecutor Webb argued, in opening statements, that this was evidence of the group holding a "dress rehearsal" to devise the fake crime.

During his testimony, Smollett claimed, for the first time, that he had engaged in a "sexual relationship" with Abimbola Osundairo, one of the two brothers he hired to stage the attack. However, during his testimony, Osundairo insisted that he is not gay. Ola Osundairo, who Smollett claimed is homophobic, took the stand to present evidence that he gets paid to be involved in homosexual activities, such as being employed at a bar as a bouncer and modeling at pride parades.

On December 9, 2021, the jury found Smollett guilty on five of the six counts of felony disorderly conduct.

In late February 2022, one of Smollett's attorneys moved for the verdict to be vacated, claiming that Smollett's rights were violated when his attorneys were prevented from actively participating in jury selection, and that the court had made various errors before and during the trial.

On March 10, 2022, Smollett was sentenced to 150 days in county jail, and was also ordered to pay $120,106 in restitution for the overtime spent by Chicago police officers. During the sentencing hearing, which lasted more than five hours, Judge James B. Linn excoriated Smollett from the bench, repeatedly calling him "narcissistic, selfish, and arrogant". Linn also indicated that Smollett perjured himself during his trial testimony. After being sentenced, Smollett engaged in several outbursts in the courtroom, during which he proclaimed his innocence. He also repeatedly shouted that he is "not suicidal".

On March 16, 2022, a three-person Illinois appeals court consisting of Judges Thomas Hoffman, Joy Cunningham and Maureen Connors ordered, in a 2–1 decision, that Smollett be released from jail, upon his posting of a $150,000 personal recognizance bond, pending the outcome of the appeal of his conviction. Hoffman and Cunningham signed the order, while Connors opposed it. The court's ruling explained that, if Smollett was not released pending appeal, it would be "unable to dispose of the instant appeal before the defendant would have served his entire sentence of incarceration". Under Illinois state law, Smollett was not required to post cash bond but must attend future hearings concerning his case. Smollett's attorneys also argued before the court that Smollett's health and safety would be in danger while he was incarcerated, an assertion that prosecutors disputed.

As of March 2022, the Osundairo brothers have not been charged for their alleged role in the hoax. In December 2021, during the second trial, Abimbola took to Instagram in a post apparently mocking Smollett's claims, by posting a picture of himself with a towel wrapped around his own neck and invited his audience to caption the image, geo-tagging the image to Boystown, one of the largest LGBT communities in the Midwestern United States.

On March 1, 2023, Smollett's attorney filed an appeal of his 150-day sentence related to the felony disorderly conduct conviction in his hate crime hoax. On December 1, 2023, the Illinois Appellate Court affirmed the conviction.

On November 21, 2024, the Supreme Court of Illinois reversed Smollett's conviction holding that retrying Smollett after he had paid $10,000 and served community service in exchange for dismissal of all charges violated Smollett's constitutional due process rights. Dan Webb said in a statement following the court’s decision that his office disagreed with its reasoning, which had nothing to do with Smollett’s culpability, and “most importantly, it does not clear Jussie Smollett’s name — he is not innocent”.

== Reaction ==
Smollett's character was subsequently removed from the final two episodes of Empire's fifth season. The studio stated on April 30, 2019, that "at this time there are no plans for the character of Jamal to return to Empire." Fox announced that Empire would be canceled at the end of Season 6.

Prior to his arrest, many prominent Democratic politicians, including Kamala Harris, Cory Booker, and Kirsten Gillibrand, quickly came out in support of Smollett and condemned the alleged hate crime. Following his arrest, many right-wing commentators and then-President Donald Trump denounced Smollett's actions and wondered if the Democratic politicians who supported Smollett would retract their comments. Ultimately, Democratic presidential candidates who supported Smollett backed off their prior comments and claimed that the hoax does a disservice to victims of real hate crimes.

Commentators have compared the alleged incident to other racial hoaxes.

Following Smollett's sentencing, Chicago Mayor Lori Lightfoot said, "The malicious and wholly fabricated claim made by Mr. Smollett resulted in over 1,500 hours of police work that cost the city over $130,000 in police overtime," and "The city feels vindicated in today's ruling that he is being held accountable and that we will appropriately receive restitution for his actions."

In interviews in the 2025 Netflix documentary, The Truth About Jussie Smollett?, Smollett maintains that he is innocent, he did not conspire with the Osundairo brothers, and he was attacked in an apparent hate crime. Writing for Variety, reviewer Daniel D'Addario notes that Smollett does not present any new evidence, and writes that "he seems overmatched at times in trying to make the case, appealing simply to viewers’ faith in him. 'I know what I saw,' he says, and various versions like it, in claiming that his attacker, contrary to evidence that had been available to this point, was a white MAGA supporter... he hasn’t had proof to support this..."

== Lawsuits ==
On March 28, 2019, Chicago city attorneys under the guidance of then-Mayor Rahm Emanuel and Police Superintendent Eddie Johnson, sent Smollett a demand for $130,000 expended on the investigation, threatening Smollett with criminal prosecution; the demand also cited statute law under which Smollett could potentially be liable for up to three times the city's actual damages plus its legal expenses.

On April 12, 2019, the city sued Smollett in the Circuit Court of Cook County for $130,000 plus $1,000 for each false statement he made to the city, plus three times the city's damages. On October 22, federal judge Virginia Kendall denied a motion for dismissal on the theory that Smollett could not have predicted the level of expenses that his false report would induce the police to incur. In November 2019, Smollett countersued, alleging he was the victim of "mass public ridicule and harm".

On April 23, 2019, the Osundairo brothers filed a federal defamation lawsuit against Smollett's legal team.

== Adaptations ==
- The 2019 Dave Chappelle stand-up comedy television special Sticks & Stones prominently features a recounting of Smollet's hoax by the comedian Chappelle.
- On March 13, 2023, a 5-part docuseries regarding the hate crime hoax titled Jussie Smollett: Anatomy of a Hoax aired on Fox Nation.
- In 2022, Faking It – Jussie Smollett, a special 47-minute-long episode of a Discovery documentary series, was aired, in which experts reveal signs in body language, linguistics and forensic psychology of footage and interviews of Jussie Smollett.
- On August 22, 2025, Netflix released the documentary The Truth About Jussie Smollett?, which features interviews with Smollet, the Osundairo brothers, journalists, Smollett's former lawyer, and Chicago detectives.

== See also ==
- Morton Downey Jr. – television personality, similarly accused of having manufactured a hoax white supremacist attack against himself in 1989
- Calum McSwiggan – YouTuber who was accused of having lied about a homophobic attack.
