= Empire: Original Soundtrack Season 2 Volume 1 =

Soundtrack album by Various artists
- Released: November 20, 2015
- Genres: Hip hop; R&B; pop
- Label: Columbia
- Producers: Timbaland; Ne-Yo; J.R. Rotem; Swizz Beatz; Teal Douville; Terrence Howard; Petey Pablo; TroyBoi; Max Beesley; Jesse "Corparal" Wilson

Empire: Original Soundtrack Season 2 Volume 1 is the second soundtrack album by the cast of the musical drama television series Empire which airs on Fox. The album includes songs that featured during the second season of the show. It was released on November 20, 2015.

== Commercial performance ==
The album debuted at No. 16 on the Billboard 200, selling 22,000 copies in the first week. As of April 2016, the album has sold 114,000 copies in the US.

== Critical response ==
AllMusic gave the album a score of three out of five, commenting that "much like the show itself, the quality of songs has become somewhat uneven" and that the album's standout track is "Boom Boom Boom Boom". Entertainment Focus gave the album four out of five stars, based on the deluxe version of the album. They felt that eight bonus tracks were the best on the album.

== Track listing ==
Standard edition
No.	Title	Writer(s)	Producer(s)	Length
1.	"Born to Love U" (Jussie Smollett)	J.R. Rotem; Teal Douville; Talay Riley	J.R. Rotem; Teal Douville	3:35
2.	"Snitch Bitch" (Terrence Howard and Petey Pablo)	Moses Barrett III; Terrence Howard	Terrence Howard; Petey Pablo	3:48
3.	"Hourglass" (V. Bozeman)	Max Beesley; Howard	Howard; Max Beesley	3:45
4.	"Get No Better (2.0)" (Serayah)	Troy Henry; Camille Purcell	TroyBoi	2:48
5.	"Bout 2 Blow" (Yazz and Timbaland)	Dwayne Murchison; Bryshere Y. Gray	Timbaland	3:01
6.	"No Doubt About It" (Jussie Smollett and Pitbull)	Shaffer Smith; Jesse "Corparal" Wilson; Tearce "Kizzo" Person	Ne-Yo; Jesse "Corparal" Wilson	4:45
7.	"Ain't About the Money" (Jussie Smollett and Yazz)	Smith; Sixx Johnson; Jason Lee York; Jesse "Corparal" Wilson; Reynell Hay	Ne-Yo; Jesse "Corparal" Wilson	3:12
8.	"Never Love Again" (Jussie Smollett)	Smith; Charles T. Harmon	Ne-Yo	4:03
9.	"Runnin'" (Yazz, Jamila Velazquez, Raquel Castro and Yani Marin)	Rotem; Joshua Kindlan Mulvey; Marty James; Raja Kumari; Claudia Alexandra Feliciano; James Robert McCall; Candice Shields; Dwayne Murchison	J.R. Rotem	2:56
10.	"Boom Boom Boom Boom" (Terrence Howard and Bre-Z)	Howard; Maxton Gig Beesley; Calesha Murray	Howard; Beesley	3:37
11.	"Heavy" (Jussie Smollett)	Smith; Jesse "Corparal" Wilson; Tierce A.J. Person; Reynell Hay	Ne-Yo; Jesse "Corparal" Wilson	2:57

Deluxe edition (bonus tracks)
No.	Title	Writer(s)	Producer(s)	Length
12.	"Ready to Go" (Pepsi Version) (Jussie Smollett)	Kasseem Dean; Tyrone Reginald Johnson; Melodie Nicholson; Josh Exantus		2:26
13.	"Powerful" (Jussie Smollett and Alicia Keys)	Rotem; Riley; Alexander Izquierdo; Jussie Smollett		4:00
14.	"Battle Cry" (Jussie Smollett)	Smith; Jesse "Corparal" Wilson; The Aristocrats	Ne-Yo; Jesse "Corparal" Wilson	4:09
15.	"Dynasty" (Yazz and Timbaland)	Murchison; Gray		2:47
16.	"Mimosa" (Jamila Velazquez, Raquel Castro and Yani Marin)	Rotem; Ruth Anne Cunningham; Christopher J Baran; Douville		3:27
17.	"Do Something With It" (Serayah)	Smith; Jesse "Corparal" Wilson; Person; Hay	Ne-Yo; Jesse "Corparal" Wilson	2:26
18.	"You Broke Love" (Jussie Smollett)			3:56
19.	"Same Song" (Bre-Z)	Brian Vincent Bates; Calesha Murray; Asiahn Bryant		3:57

== Personnel ==
Executive music producer

- Timbaland

Soundtrack album producers

- Timbaland
- Ne-Yo
- J.R. Rotem
- Teal Douville
- Swizz Beatz

Music supervisor

- Jen Ross (Format Entertainment)

Executive in charge of music for 20th Century Fox Television

- Geoff Bywater

Executive in charge of music for Columbia

- Shawn Holiday

Music coordinator

- Simone Sheffield

Music production for Fox

- Carol Farhat

Music production liaison

- Robin Simms

Soundtrack coordination

- Nicole Fox
- Sebastien LeTellier

Periscope Studio manager

- Michael Nels

Mastered by

- Mark Santangelo
- Dave Kutch

Art direction and design

- Dave Bett
- Taylor Diglio

Executive producers

- Brian Grazer
- Francie Calfo
- Danny Strong
- Lee Daniels
- Ilene Chaiken

== Charts ==
=== Weekly charts ===
Chart (2015)	Peak position
French Albums (SNEP)	171
UK Albums (OCC)	74
UK Soundtrack Albums (OCC)	1
US Billboard 200	16
US Top R&B/Hip-Hop Albums (Billboard)	4
US Soundtrack Albums (Billboard)	1

=== Year-end charts ===
Chart (2016)	Position
US Top R&B/Hip-Hop Albums (Billboard)	23
US Soundtrack Albums (Billboard)	5
