= What Is Love (V. Bozeman song) =

"What is Love"

Single by V. Bozeman

from the album Empire: Original Soundtrack from Season 1
- Released: January 7, 2015
- Recorded: 2015
- Genre: Soul; R&B
- Length: 2:53
- Label: 20th Century Fox TV; Mosley Music Group
- Songwriter(s): Daniel Jones; Timbaland; Jim Beanz
- Producer(s): Timbaland; Jim Beanz

V. Bozeman singles chronology
"Race Jones" (2014)	"What is Love" (2015)	"Black and Blue" (2015)

"What is Love" is a song recorded by American recording artist V. Bozeman for 1st studio album of the TV series Empire. The song was written by Daniel Jones, Timbaland, Jim Beanz, while Timbaland, Jim Beanz also handled the production.

== Critical reception ==
The song received positive reviews from critics. Billboard praised "What is Love" as a "captivating performance", it said "As fans will recall, Bozeman put an exclamation point on the first season of Empire...".

== Music video ==
The music video was released on January 14, 2015.

== Track listing ==
1. "What is Love" - Single

== Chart performance ==
"What is Love" has not entered the Billboard Hot 100 but has charted at number 12 on the Bubbling Under Hot 100 Singles, the song has entered at number 39 in the US R&B songs, and at number 13 in the US Hot R&B/Hip-Hop Songs. It has also entered at number 67 in France.

Chart (2015–16)	Peak position
US Bubbling Under Hot 100 Singles (Billboard)	12
US R&B Songs (Billboard)	39
US Hot R&B/Hip-Hop Songs (Billboard)	13
France (SNEP)	67

== Release history ==
Region	Date	Format	Label
Worldwide	January 7, 2015	Digital download	20th Century Fox TV; Mosley Music Group
