= List of programs broadcast by TV One =

This is a list of programs broadcast by TV One. This list is current as of September 2024.

== Current programming ==
=== Original programming ===
- Fatal Attraction
- For My Man
- Payback

==== Syndicated reruns ====
- Black-ish
- The Cosby Show
- A Different World
- Eve
- Good Times
- The Jeffersons
- Living Single
- Sanford and Son

== Former programming ==
=== Original programming ===
- 100 Greatest Black Power Moves
- Asking for a Friend
- ATL Homicide
- Baisden After Dark
- Belle's
- Bid Whist Party Throwdown
- Bill Bellamy's Who's Got Jokes?
- Black Men Revealed
- Born Again Virgin
- Can You Dig It!
- Celebrity Crime Files
- Deadly Case Files
- Deceived
- Divine Restoration
- The D.L. Hughley Show
- Donnie After Dark
- Evidence of Innocence
- Family Reunion
- Fatal Attraction: Last Words
- Find Our Missing
- For My Woman
- Full Plate
- The Funny Spot
- G. Garvin: The Road Tour
- The Game of Dating
- Get the Hook Up
- The Gospel of Music with Jeff Majors
- Here We Go Again
- Hollywood Divas
- I Married a Baller
- Justice by Any Means
- K-Ci & JoJo...Come Clean
- Kitchen Commando
- Life After
- Life Therapy
- Lisaraye: The Real Mccoy
- Living It Up with Patti LaBelle
- Living with Soul
- Love Addiction
- Love That Girl!
- Makeover Manor
- The Manns
- Mario's Green House
- #Murder
- My Momma Throws Down
- The Next :15
- The One
- One Stage to the Next
- Parole Diaries
- Quiet on the Set
- R&B Divas: Atlanta
- R&B Divas: Los Angeles
- Raising Fame
- Renovate My Place
- Rickey Smiley For Real
- The Rickey Smiley Show
- Roland S. Martin Perspective
- Save My Son with Dr. Steve Perry
- Sharp Talk
- Singletary Says
- Sins of the City
- Sister Circle
- The Tom Joyner Sky Show
- Thou Shalt Not
- True Hollywood Stories
- Turn Up the Heat with G. Garvin
- TV One Access
- TV One on One
- Two Sides
- The Ultimate Merger
- Uncensored
- Unsung
- Unsung Hollywood
- Verses and Flow
- Vidiots
- We're the Campbells
- Wet Paint
- Will to Live

=== Acquired programming ===
- 227 (2005-08)
- All About the Andersons (2007-09)
- All in the Family (2004-05)
- All of Us (2006-23)
- Amen (2004-13)
- B. Smith with Style
- The Bernie Mac Show (2020-23)
- Between Brothers (2010-12)
- Boston Public (2004-05)
- Brick City
- Cedric the Entertainer Presents (2006-11)
- City of Angels (2005-06)
- Comics Unleashed (2006-08)
- The Cosby Mysteries
- Day Break (2008)
- Divorce Court (2008-10)
- Donna Richardson: Mind, Body, & Spirit
- Empire (2017-23)
- Everybody Hates Chris (2014-23)
- Family Matters (2019-23)
- Family Time (2012-13)
- Fastlane (2006-08)
- The Flip Wilson Show (2010-13)
- For Your Love (2009-23)
- George (2004-05)
- Gimme a Break! (2012-15)
- Girlfriends (2014-23)
- Good News (2009-11)
- Half & Half (2008-12)
- Hangin' with Mr. Cooper (2007-08)
- HawthoRNe (2011-13)
- The Hughleys (2009-11)
- I'll Fly Away
- In Living Color (2007-23)
- In the House (2005-08)
- Judge Karen (2010)
- Keasha's Perfect Dress
- Like Family (2009-11)
- Lincoln Heights (2010-11)
- A Man Called Hawk (2005)
- Martin (2005-15)
- Minor Adjustments (2005-07)
- New York Undercover (2007-11)
- On Our Own (2007)
- One on One (2020-23)
- The Parent 'Hood (2006-09)
- The Parkers (2015-24)
- The PJs (2007-11)
- The Richard Pryor Show (2011-13)
- Roc (2005-07)
- Showtime at the Apollo (2005-08)
- Soul Food (2011-13)
- South Central (2007-09)
- Starting Over (2005-07)
- That's My Mama (2009-13)
- The Tom Joyner Show
- The Tracy Morgan Show (2010-12)
- Under One Roof (2005-07)
- Wanda at Large (2006-08)
- The Wendy Williams Show (2020-21)
- What's Happening!! (2009-23)
- What's Happening Now!! (2012-23)
- Where I Live (2008-11)

=== News and information programming ===
- America's Black Forum
- Black Enterprise Business Report
- Dish Nation
- News One Now
- Our World with Black Enterprise
- Washington Watch with Roland Martin
