= Jussie Smollett =

American actor (born 1982)

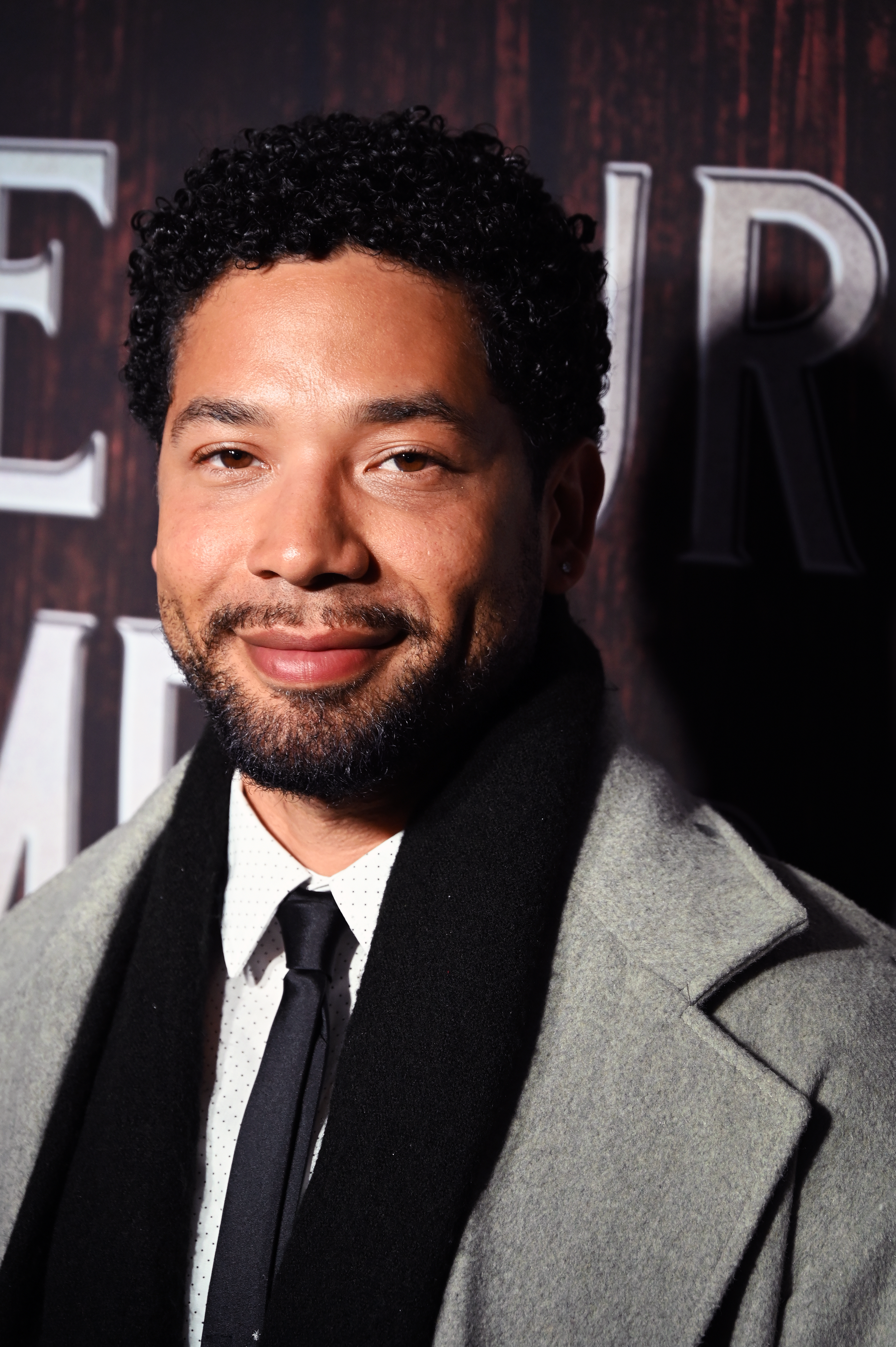
- Smollett in 2026
- Born: June 21, 1982 (age 44); Santa Rosa, California, U.S.
- Occupations: Actor; singer
- Years active: 1991–1995, 2009–2019, 2021–present
- Relatives: Jurnee Smollett (sister); Jake Smollett (brother)

Jussie Smollett (/ˈdʒʌsi sməlˈɛt/, born June 21, 1982) is an American actor, filmmaker and singer. He began his career as a child actor in 1991 debuting in The Mighty Ducks (1992). From 2015 to 2019, Smollett portrayed musician Jamal Lyon in the Fox drama series Empire.

In January 2019, Smollett claimed to have been a victim of a hate crime, but police later determined that he had staged the attack with two acquaintances. He was initially charged with filing a false police report, but charges were dropped after he completed community service and forfeited $10,000. In 2020, a special prosecutor re-indicted him, and he was convicted on five counts in December 2021. He was sentenced to jail in March 2022, although his release was ordered after six days. The sentence was upheld on appeal in 2023, but the Illinois Supreme Court later reversed the conviction in 2024 on the basis that he had fulfilled the plea agreement made in 2019.

== Early life ==
Jussie Smollett was born in Santa Rosa, California, to Joel and Janet (née Harris) Smollett. His mother is African-American and Irish, and his father is Jewish. Smollett is biracial and Jewish. He has said that his father would "kill you if you called him white". His father was absent from his life for a significant portion of his childhood. He has three brothers and two sisters: Jake, Jocqui, Jojo, Jurnee, and Jazz, several of whom are also actors. The family moved to the Elmhurst neighborhood of the New York City borough of Queens when he was two years old, then to Los Angeles when he was about seven.

Smollett attended Paramus Catholic High School in Paramus, New Jersey. When he was 19, Smollett told his parents he was gay.

== Career ==
Smollett talking in a 2018 interview on Sister Circle

Smollett began his acting career as a child model in New York City and later worked as an extra on the New York-shot movies Mo' Better Blues (1990) and New Jack City (1991) He went on to act in the films The Mighty Ducks (1992) and Rob Reiner's North (1994). On television, he starred alongside his five real-life siblings in the short-lived ABC sitcom On Our Own in 1994–1995. In 2012, he returned to acting with the leading role in Patrik-Ian Polk's LGBT-themed comedy-drama The Skinny. Also that year, he released an EP titled The Poisoned Hearts Club. He later guest-starred on The Mindy Project (2012) and Revenge (2014).

In 2014, Smollett was cast as Jamal Lyon—a gay musician struggling to gain the approval of his father Lucious—opposite Taraji P. Henson and Terrence Howard in the Fox drama series Empire. His role was hailed as groundbreaking for its positive depiction of a black gay man on television. He reprised his role in subsequent seasons and directed an episode of the fourth season in 2017. His character was removed from the final two episodes of season five because of the assault controversy.

In February 2015, Smollett signed a recording contract with Columbia Records. He co-wrote the songs "I Wanna Love You" and "You're So Beautiful" on the Original Soundtrack from Season 1 of Empire album, which was released in March 2015.

In 2016, Smollett guest-starred alongside his younger sister Jurnee in Underground. He released his debut album, Sum of My Music, in March 2018, through his own label, Music of Sound. Sum of My Music is an R&B album that features elements of electronic music and hip hop.

On April 30, 2019, Fox Entertainment announced that though Smollett's contract had been extended for the sixth season of Empire, there were no plans for his character to appear during it.

Smollett directed B-Boy Blues, a movie based on the 1994 novel by James Earl Hardy. The movie was released in November 2021.

== 2019 hate crime hoax ==
On January 29, 2019, Smollett told police that he had been physically attacked outside his apartment building, along with the use of racial and homophobic slurs. He was treated at Northwestern Memorial Hospital and was released "in good condition" later that morning. A subsequent police investigation found that he had paid two work acquaintances, who were also brothers, to stage the assault.

On February 20, 2019, Smollett was charged by a grand jury with a class 4 felony for filing a false police report. On March 26, 2019, all charges were dropped. First Assistant State's Attorney Joseph Magats said the office reached a deal with Smollett's defense team in which prosecutors dropped the charges upon Smollett completing 16 hours of community service and forfeiting his $10,000 bond. On April 12, 2019, the city of Chicago filed a lawsuit in the Circuit Court of Cook County against Smollett for the costs, totaling $130,105.15, of overtime authorities expended investigating the hoax. In November 2019, Smollett filed a countersuit against the city of Chicago, alleging he was the victim of "mass public ridicule and harm" and arguing he should not be made to reimburse the city for the cost of the investigation.

After the charges were dropped, allegations of favoritism and leniency were made against the prosecutor, Kim Foxx. In June 2019, Foxx asked the state to conduct an independent inquiry by a special investigator. On February 11, 2020, after further investigation by a special prosecutor was completed, Smollett was indicted again by a Cook County grand jury on six counts of felony disorderly conduct about making four false police reports. On June 12, 2020, a judge rejected Smollett's claim that his February charge violated the principle of double jeopardy. His trial began in November 2021, and on December 9, he was found guilty of five of the six counts.

On March 10, 2022, Smollett was sentenced to 150 days in county jail and 2.5 years on probation. He was also ordered to pay the city of Chicago just over $120,000 in restitution and was fined $25,000. His lawyers filed a notice of appeal the following day. On March 16, 2022, an Illinois appeals court ordered that Smollett be released from jail, upon his posting of a $150,000 personal recognizance bond, pending the outcome of the appeal of his conviction. On March 1, 2023, Smollett's attorney filed an appeal of his 150-day sentence related to the felony disorderly conduct conviction in his hate crime hoax. The court, on December 1, 2023, upheld the conviction. On November 21, 2024, the Illinois Supreme Court reversed Smollett's conviction, holding that retrying him after he had paid $10,000 and served community service in exchange for dismissal of all charges violated his constitutional due process rights.

== Personal life ==
Smollett publicly came out as gay during a televised interview with Ellen DeGeneres in March 2015. When his gay character from Empire engaged in a tryst with a female character, Smollett defended the plot development by stating that he and Empire's co-creator Lee Daniels were trying to create a conversation about sexual fluidity in the gay community. While Daniels and Smollett are gay, Daniels has stated that they are occasionally attracted to women. (Note: ”Jussie and I both share the same feeling that, yes, even though we are gay, we're sexual human beings...And we do occasionally want to sleep with a woman. [Laughs] Maybe once every 10 or 15 years, but it happens! And there are a lot of people who don't want to hear about that. It's such a complicated conversation. It's not necessarily the body one is attracted to. You can be sexually attracted to the spirit, the energy, the life force in another person. We're showing life on Empire, and I won't apologize for it.”) On June 20, 2025, Smollett announced that he was engaged to Jabari Redd.

In 2007, Smollett pleaded no contest to three misdemeanor counts providing false evidence to law enforcement, resulting from a DUI stop in which he gave police a false name pretending to be his brother. He also pleaded no contest to driving with a blood alcohol level over the legal limit and driving without a valid driver's license and was sentenced to a fine and three years of probation.

== Filmography ==
=== Film ===
Year	Film	Role	Notes
1992	The Mighty Ducks	Terry Hall	Nominated – Young Artist Award for Outstanding Young Ensemble Cast in a Motion Picture
1994	North	Adam	
2009	Pitch This	Mike	Short film
2012	The Skinny	Magnus	
2014	Born to Race: Fast Track	Tariq	Direct-to-video
2014	Ask Me Anything	Nico Dempster	
2016	The Tale of Four	John	Short film
2017	Alien: Covenant – Prologue: Last Supper	Ricks	Short film
2017	Alien: Covenant	Ricks	
2017	Marshall	Langston Hughes	
2021	B-Boy Blues		Director and writer
2024	The Lost Holliday	Jason Holliday	Director and co-writer (with Jerrell Chesney)

=== Television ===
Year	Title	Role	Notes
1991	A Little Piece of Heaven	Salem Bordeaux	Television film
1993	Alex Haley's Queen	Simon	Miniseries
1993	Coach	Billy	Episode: "Piece o' Cake"
1993–1994	Cro	Mike	Voice, 20 episodes
1994–1995	On Our Own	Jesse Jerrico	Series regular, 20 episodes
2012	The Mindy Project	Barry Stassen	Episode: "Josh and Mindy's Christmas Party"
2014	Revenge	Jamie	Episode: "Ashes"
2015–2019	Empire	Jamal Lyon	Series regular Nominated – BET Award for Best Actor; Nominated – Teen Choice Award for Choice TV Actor: Drama; Nominated – Teen Choice Award for Choice TV: Breakout Star; Directed season 4, episode 16
2016	Underground	Josey	2 episodes
2016	Live! with Kelly	Himself	Guest host, six episodes
2017	Star	Jamal Lyon	Episode: "The Winner Takes it All"
2018	America Divided	Himself	Episode: "Whose History?"
2023	Jussie Smollett: Anatomy of a Hoax	Himself	5-part docuseries, aired on Fox Nation
2025	The Truth About Jussie Smollett?	Himself	Netflix
2025	Special Forces: World's Toughest Test	Himself	Contestant: Season 4 (3 episodes)

=== Music videos ===
Year	Artist	Title
2015	Mariah Carey	"Infinity"
2016	Jussie Smollett	"F.U.W."

== Awards and nominations ==
Year	Awards	Category	Recipient	Outcome
1993	Young Artist Award	Outstanding Young Ensemble Cast in a Motion Picture	The Mighty Ducks	Nominated
2015	BET Awards	Best Actor	Empire	Nominated
2015	Teen Choice Awards	Choice TV Actor Drama	Empire	Nominated
2015	Teen Choice Awards	Choice TV: Breakout Star	Empire	Nominated
2015	Teen Choice Awards	Choice TV: Chemistry	Empire	Nominated
2015	Teen Choice Awards	Choice Music: Song from a Movie or TV Show	"You're So Beautiful"	Nominated
2016	NAACP Image Awards	Outstanding Supporting Actor in a Drama Series	Empire	Nominated
2016	NAACP Image Awards	Outstanding New Artist	Empire	Won
2016	NAACP Image Awards	Outstanding Duo, Group or Collaboration	Empire	Won
2016	NAACP Image Awards	Outstanding Song (Contemporary)	Empire	Won

== Discography ==
=== Albums ===
List of studio albums, with selected chart positions and details
Title	Album details	Peak chart positions
Title	Album details	US Heat.
Sum of My Music	Released: March 2, 2018; Label: Music of Sound/Human Re Sources; Format: Digital download	22
My Party	Released: September 30, 2025; Label: Music of Sound/Rowdy Records; Format: Digital download	—

=== Extended plays ===
Year	EP details
2012	Poisoned Hearts Club: Released: March 9, 2012; Label: Wired Music Media; Format: Digital download

=== Singles ===
Title	Year	Peak chart positions										Sales	Album
Title	Year	US	US R&B /HH	US R&B	US Adult R&B	FRA	GER	SWI	AUT	POR	BUL	Sales	Album
"Good Enough"	2015	— (Note: "Good Enough" did not enter the Billboard Hot 100 chart, but peaked at number 6 on the Bubbling Under Hot 100 chart.)	33	13	—	60	25	55	54	2	40	US: 83,000	Empire: Original Soundtrack from Season 1
"Keep Your Money"	2015	99	32	13	—	181	91	—	—	—	—	US: 54,000	Empire: Original Soundtrack from Season 1
"No Apologies" (featuring Yazz)	2015	— (Note: "No Apologies" did not enter the Billboard Hot 100 chart, but peaked at number 23 on the Bubbling Under Hot 100 chart.)	44	—	—	195	—	—	—	—	—	US: 53,000	Empire: Original Soundtrack from Season 1
"I Wanna Love You"	2015	—	— (Note: "I Wanna Love You" did not enter the Billboard Hot R&B/Hip-Hop Songs chart, but peaked at number 7 on the Bubbling Under Hot R&B/Hip-Hop Songs chart.)	21	—	—	—	—	—	—	—		Empire: Original Soundtrack from Season 1
"Money For Nothing" (featuring Yazz)	2015	—	— (Note: "Money For Nothing" did not enter the Billboard Hot R&B/Hip-Hop Songs chart, but peaked at number 9 on the Bubbling Under Hot R&B/Hip-Hop Songs chart.)	23	—	—	94	—	—	—	—		Empire: Original Soundtrack from Season 1
"You're so Beautiful" (featuring Yazz)	2015	47	18	10	—	79	42	—	—	—	—		Empire: Original Soundtrack from Season 1
"Conqueror" (featuring Estelle)	2015	42	15	8	15	157	87	—	—	—	—		Empire: Original Soundtrack from Season 1
"Nothing To Lose"	2015	— (Note: "Nothing To Lose" did not enter the Billboard Hot 100 chart, but peaked at number 21 on the Bubbling Under Hot 100 chart.)	—	15	—	—	—	—	—	—	—		Empire: Original Soundtrack from Season 1
"Powerful" (featuring Alicia Keys)	2015	— (Note: "Powerful" did not enter the Billboard Hot 100 chart, but peaked at number 12 on the Bubbling Under Hot 100 chart.)	36	10	—	152	—	—	—	—	—		Empire: Original Soundtrack Season 2 Volume 1
"Ain't About the Money" (featuring Yazz)	2015	—	—	—	—	—	—	—	—	—	39		Empire: Original Soundtrack Season 2 Volume 1
"No Doubt About it" (featuring Pitbull)	2015	—	—	18	—	—	—	—	—	—	—		Empire: Original Soundtrack Season 2 Volume 1
"Chasing the Sky" (featuring Terrence Howard & Yazz)	2016	—	— (Note: "Chasing the Sky" did not enter the Billboard Hot R&B/Hip-Hop Songs chart, but peaked at number 2 on the Bubbling Under Hot R&B/Hip-Hop Songs chart.)	24	—	—	—	—	—	—	—		Empire: Original Soundtrack Season 2 Volume 2
"Good People" (featuring Yazz)	2016	—	— (Note: "Good People" did not enter the Billboard Hot R&B/Hip-Hop Songs chart, but peaked at number 3 on the Bubbling Under Hot R&B/Hip-Hop Songs chart.)	20	—	—	—	—	—	—	—		Empire: Original Soundtrack Season 2 Volume 2
"Need Freedom"	2016	—	—	—	30	—	—	—	—	—	—		Empire: Original Soundtrack Season 3
"Freedom"	2018	—	—	—	—	—	—	—	—	—	—		Sum of My Music
"Catch Your Eye" (featuring Swizz Beatz)	2018	—	—	—	—	—	—	—	—	—	—		Sum of My Music
"Hurt People"	2018	—	—	—	—	—	—	—	—	—	—		Sum of My Music
"Ha Ha (I Love You)"	2018	—	—	—	19	—	—	—	—	—	—		Sum of My Music
