= V. Bozeman =

American singer

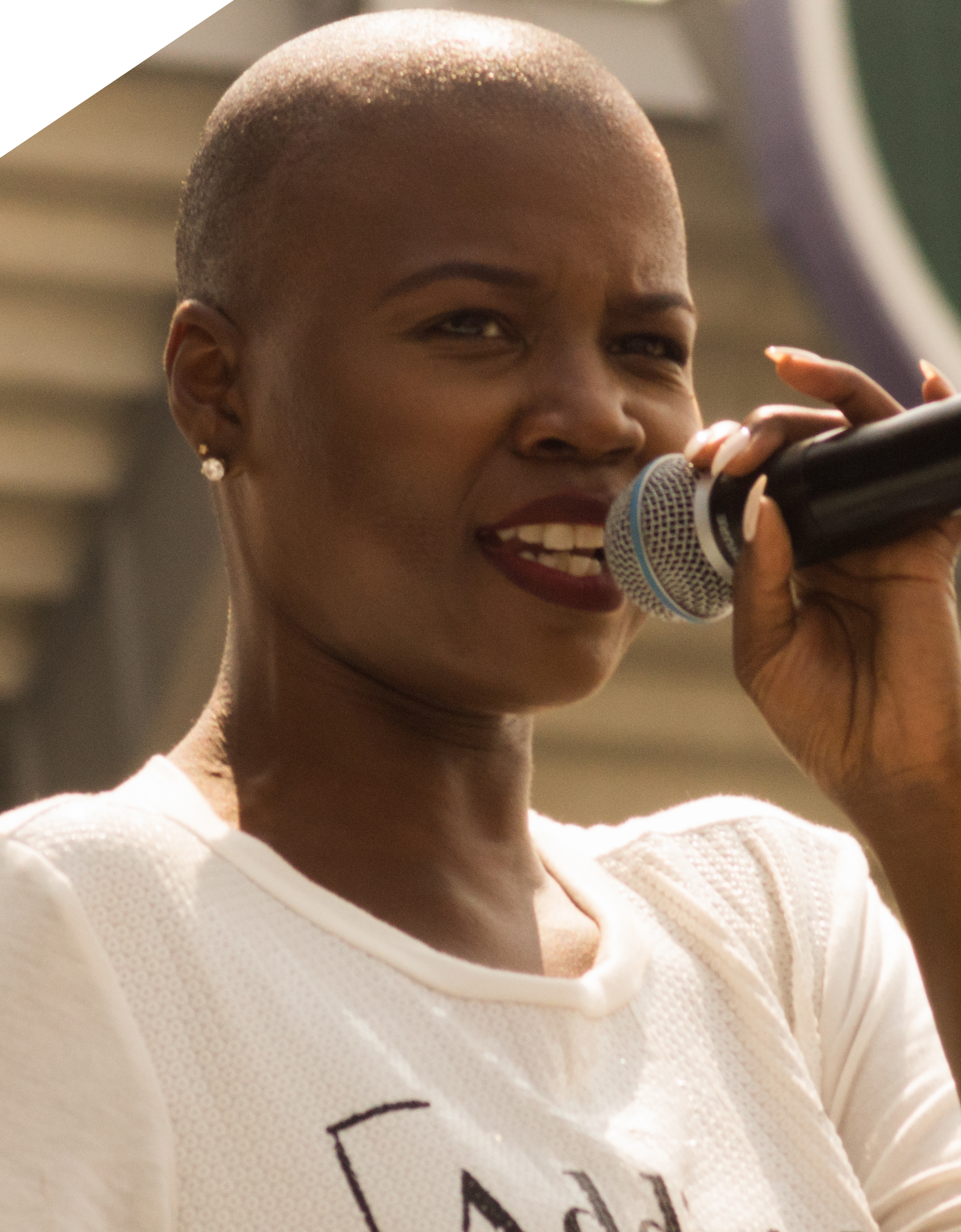
- Bozeman in 2015

Background information
- Born: Veronika Jean Bozeman; January 9, 1988 (age 38); Los Angeles, California, U.S.
- Genres: R&B; pop; soul
- Occupations: Singer; songwriter; actress
- Years active: 2011–present
- Labels: Mosley Music; Epic; Artistry Worldwide
- Website: thatgirlv.com/

Veronika Jean Bozeman (born January 9, 1988) is an American singer and actress best known for her recurring role as Veronica in the Fox primetime musical drama television series Empire. Bozeman began her career vocal producing songs such as "Lay It Down" by Lloyd in 2011.

== Early life ==
Bozeman was born and raised in the South region of Los Angeles, California. She attended Crenshaw High School and California State University, Long Beach. She had the dream of being a singer since early childhood.

== Career ==
Bozeman is currently under the label Mosley Music Group. She has previously been featured in music by Timbaland, CeeLo Green, Timothy Bloom, and Rihanna. Her manager is Monica Payne, formerly of the short-lived new jack swing groups The Gyrlz and Terri & Monica.

Bozeman performed "What is Love" on the pilot of the hit show Empire. The show's debut soundtrack album peaked at number one on the Billboard 200 chart in the United States. The music video of the song garnered more than 100 million views on YouTube.

Bozeman appeared as the love interest of Raheem DeVaughn in his 2019 music video "Just Right".

In 2023, she was featured on the soundtrack of the musical movie The Color Purple with the song "Girls", featuring Dyo and Ludmilla.

== Discography ==
=== Singles ===
==== As lead artist ====
List of singles, with selected chart positions
Title	Year	Peak chart positions					Sales	Album
Title	Year	US	US R&B	US Adult R&B	US R&B/HH	FR	Sales	Album
"Race Jones"	2014	—	—	—	—	—		—N/a
"What is Love"	2015	112	13	—	39	67	*US: 54,000	Empire Soundtrack from season 1
"Black and Blue"	2015	—	—	—	—	—		Empire Soundtrack from season 1
"Smile" (featuring Timbaland)	2015	—	—	20	—	—		TBA
"You Can't Break Me" (featuring Tyrese)	2016	—	—	26	—	—		TBA
"Something In My Heart"	2016	—	—	—	—	—		TBA
"GO"	2016	—	—	24	—	—		TBA
"Dear Officer" (featuring Young Life)	—	—	—	—	—			TBA
"Juicy" (solo or remix featuring Trina and Too $hort)	2020	—	—	—	—	—		TBA
"Resolve"	2023	—	—	—	—	—		

==== As featured artist ====
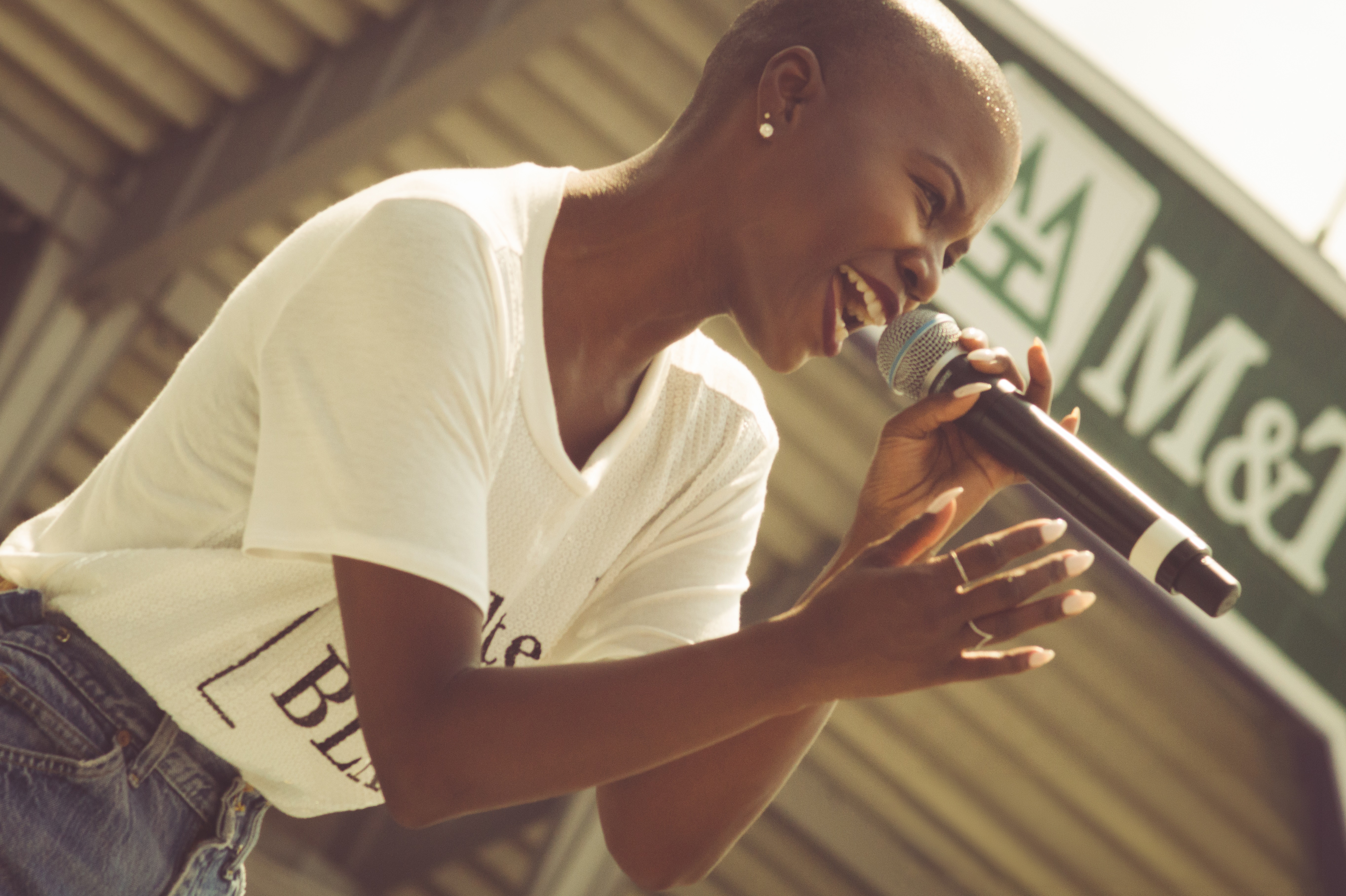
V. Bozeman performing in June 2015

List of singles, with selected chart positions
Title	Year	Peak chart positions				Album
Title	Year	US	US Pop	US R&B	Adult R&B	Album
"'Til the End of Time" (Timothy Bloom featuring V. Bozeman)	2011	—	—	82	28	The Budding Rose EP
"Bad Girl" (Serayah McNeill featuring V. Bozeman)	2015	—	—	—	—	Empire Soundtrack from season 1
"Happy Alone" (Matrix & Futurebound featuring V. Bozeman)	2015	—	—	—	—	—N/a

==== Other Songs ====
- 2015 : Hourglass (prod by Max Beesley & Terrence Howard)
- 2023 : Girls (From the Original Motion Picture "The Color Purple") (with Dyo and Ludmilla)

== Filmography ==
=== Films ===
- 2010 : The Blue Wall: Kendra (short)
- 2016 : The Black Book: herself (short – starring Tyrese & Tank)
- 2016 : 90 Days: Samantha (short – starring Teyonah Parris – Jennia Fredrique)
- 2016 : Boy Bye: Melanie (starring Shondrella Avery – starring Tammy Townsend and Omar Gooding)
- 2017 : Versus (short – starring Jesse Williams)
- 2019 : Sacrifice : Tamika
- 2020 : Paydirt: Cici
- 2021 : Karen : Fatima
- 2021 : Howard High : Tracy
- 2023 : Still Here : Jennifer Law
- 2024 : Snatched : Angela

=== Television ===
- 2015–2019 : Empire: Veronica (recurring role, 7 episodes)
- 2017 : The Simpsons : additional voices (1 episode)
- 2021 : Sacrifice : Tamika (main role)
